= List of hôtels particuliers in Paris =

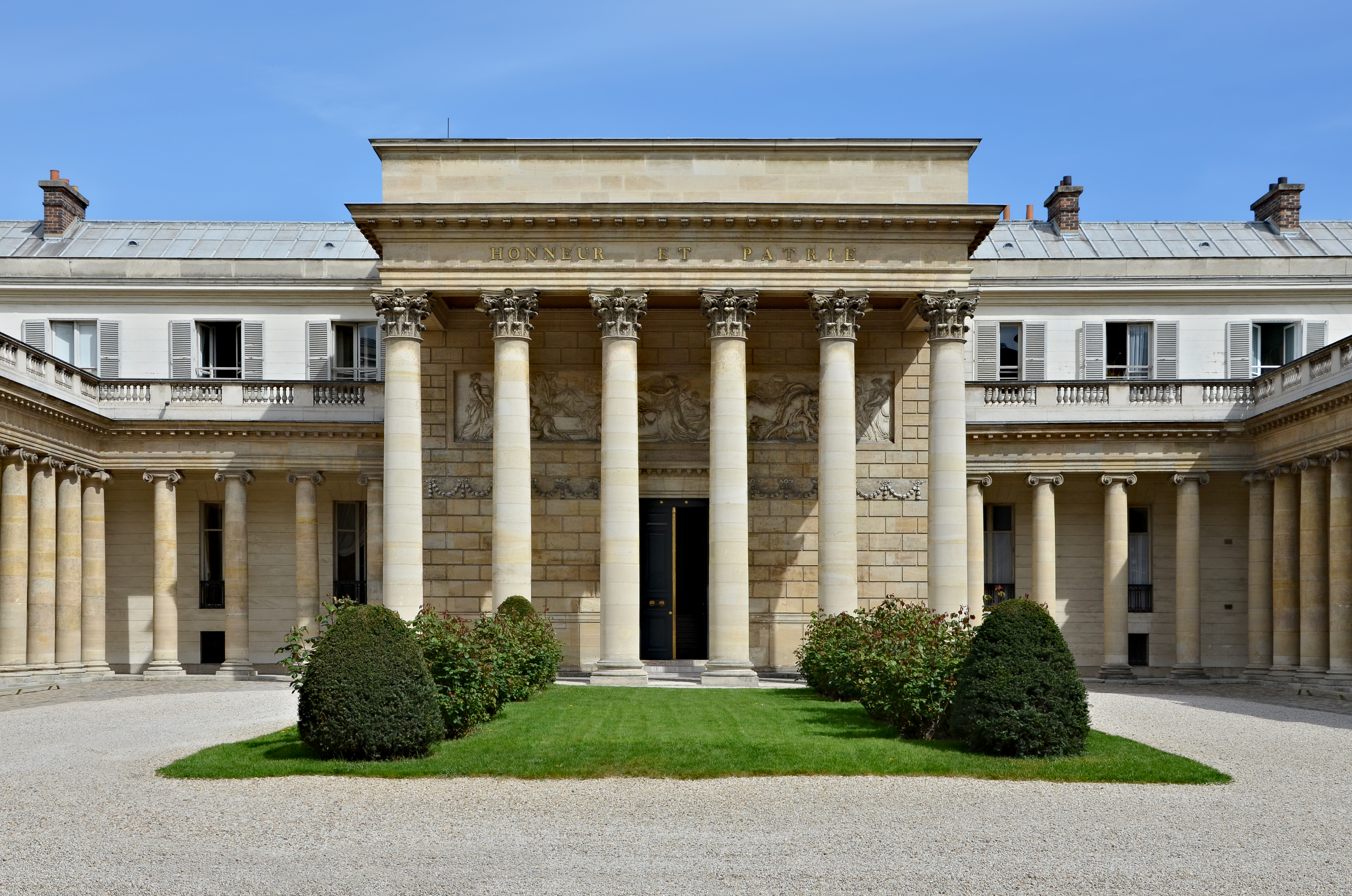
Palais de la Légion d'Honneur, also known as the Hôtel de Salm, 64 rue de Lille, Paris.

In French contexts, an hôtel particulier is a townhouse of a grand sort. Whereas an ordinary maison (house) was built as part of a row, sharing party walls with the houses on either side and directly fronting on a street, an hôtel particulier was often free-standing, and by the 18th century it would always be located entre cour et jardin: that is, between the entrance court, the cour d'honneur, and the garden behind.

There are many hôtels particuliers in Paris. Numerous hôtels particuliers have survived the transformation of Paris over the centuries to form part of the city’s heritage. Some hôtels particuliers have also been turned into museums, like the Musée Carnavalet, Musée Picasso in the Marais, the Musée Rodin, Musée de la Légion d'honneur in the 7th arrondissement, the Musée Nissim de Camondo, the Musée Cernuschi and the Musée Jacquemart André in the 8th arrondissement.

== Gallery ==
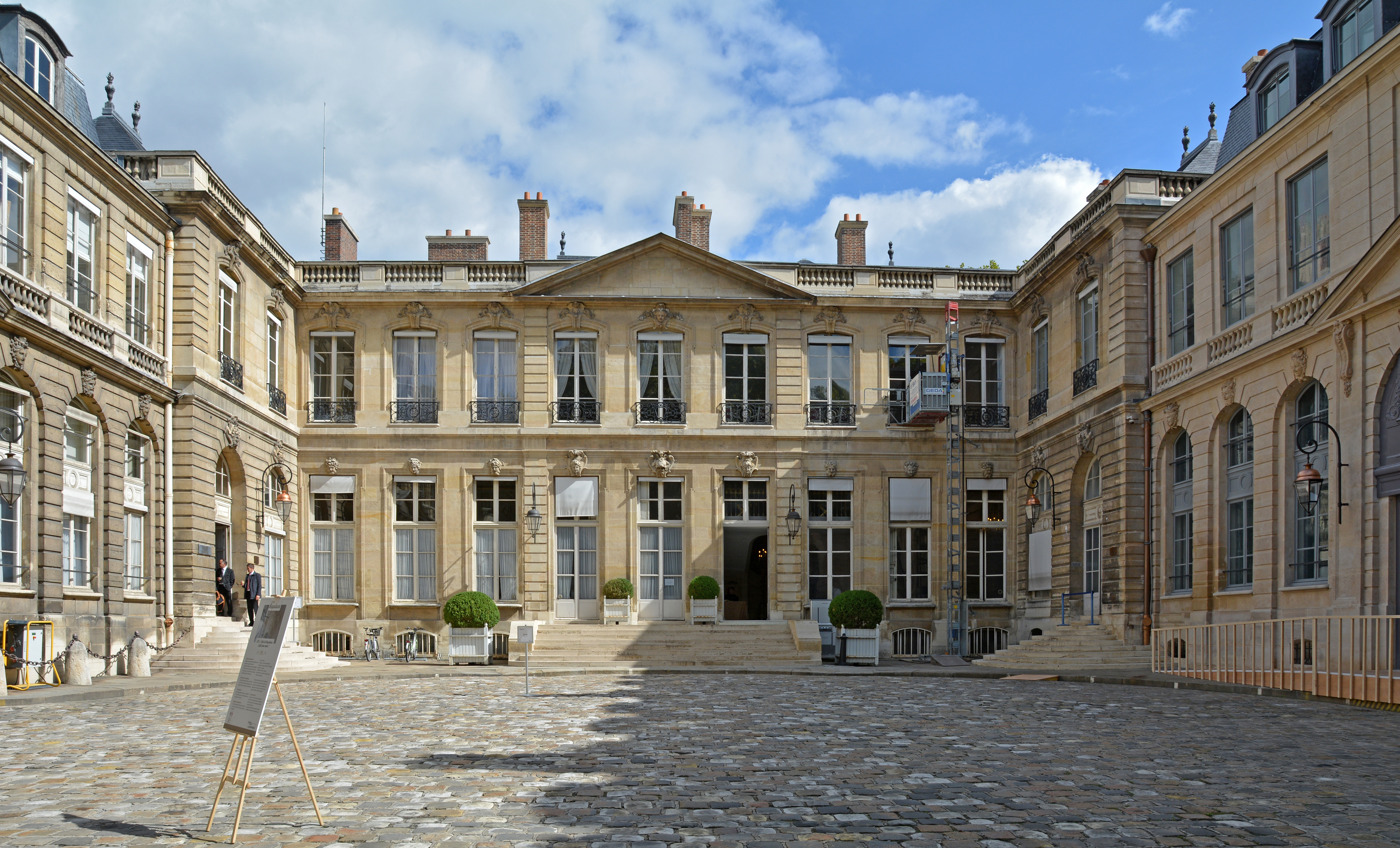
Hôtel de Roquelaure

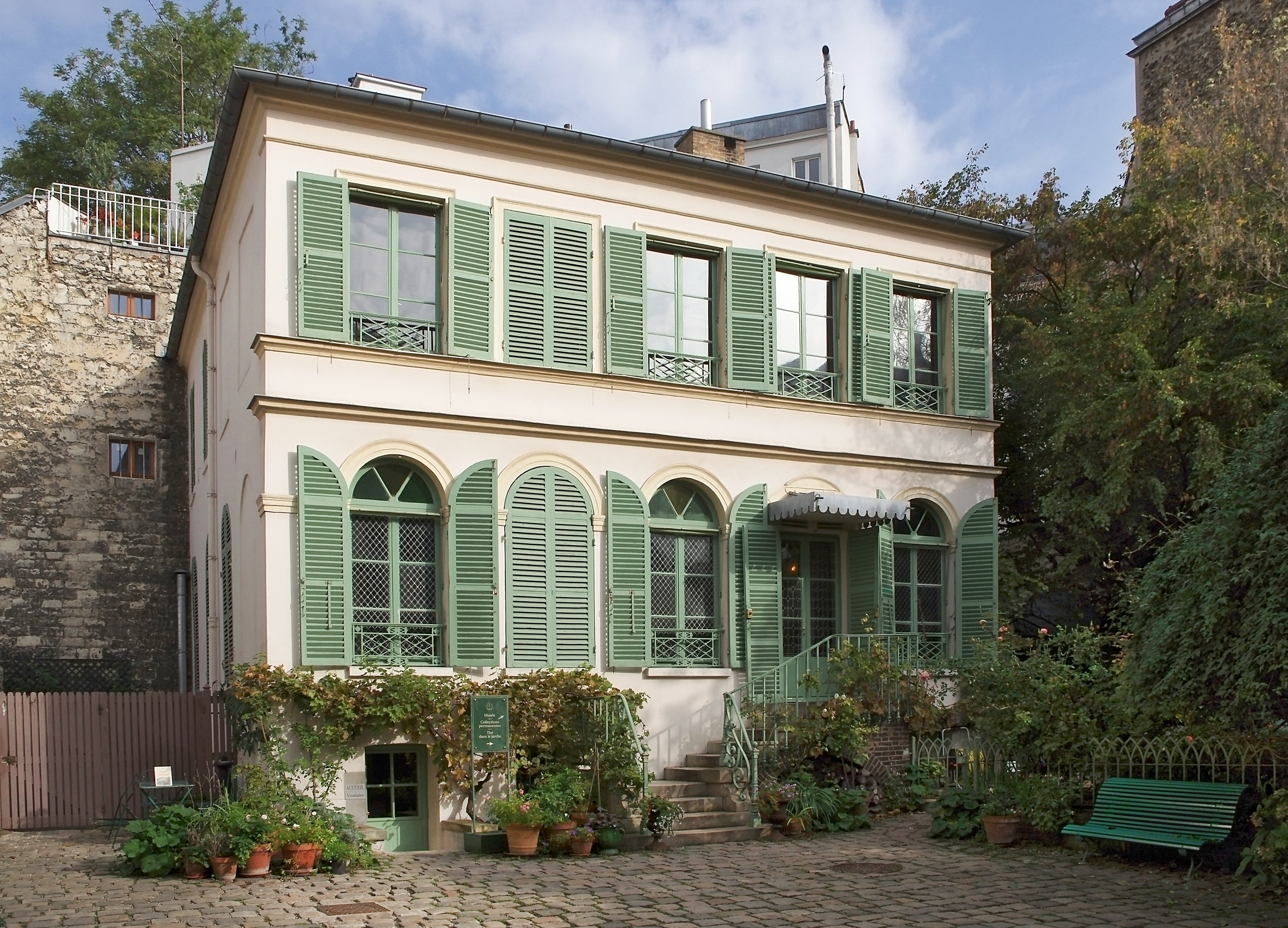
Hôtel Renan-Scheffer

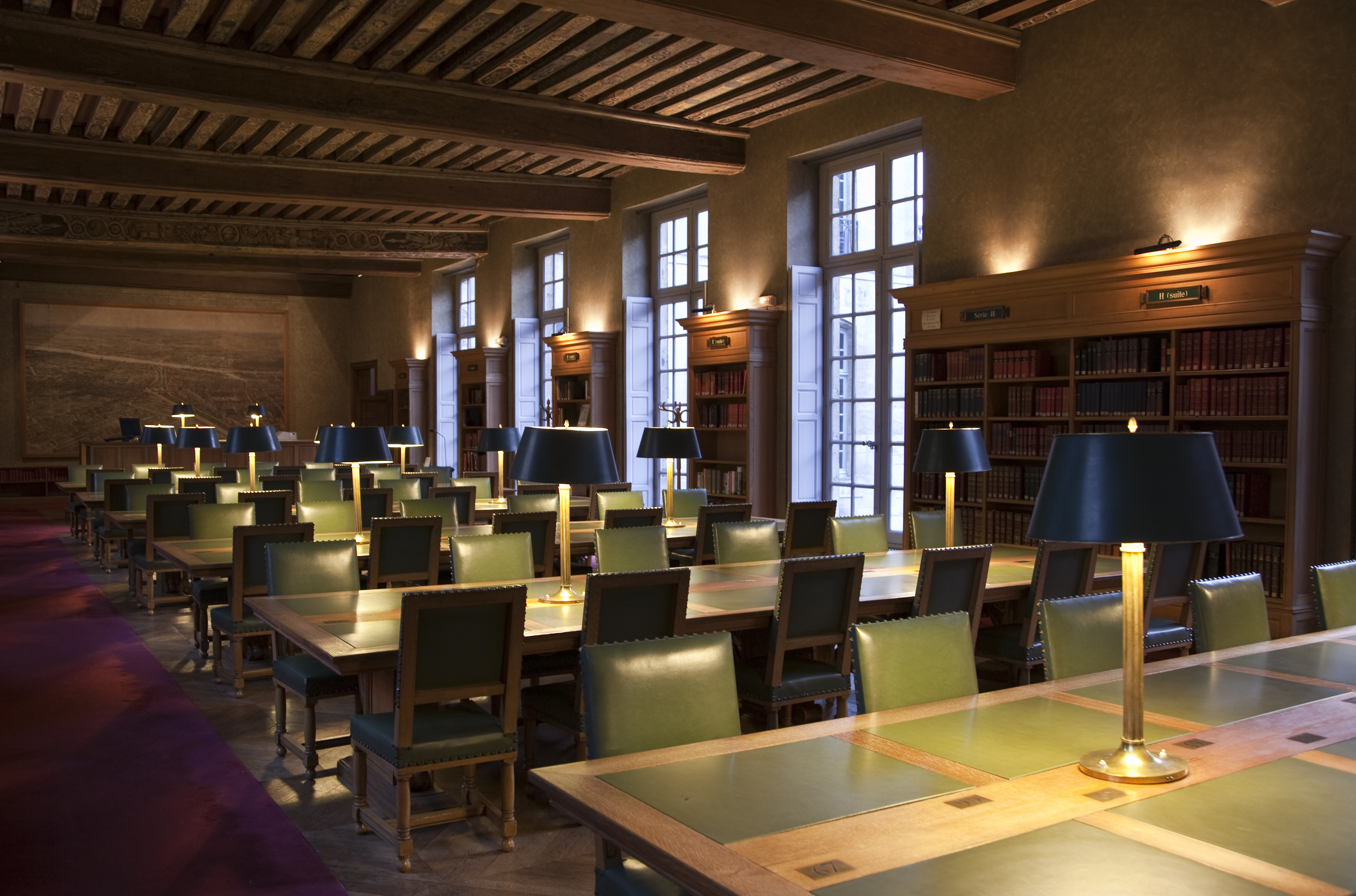
Hôtel d'Angoulême Lamoignon

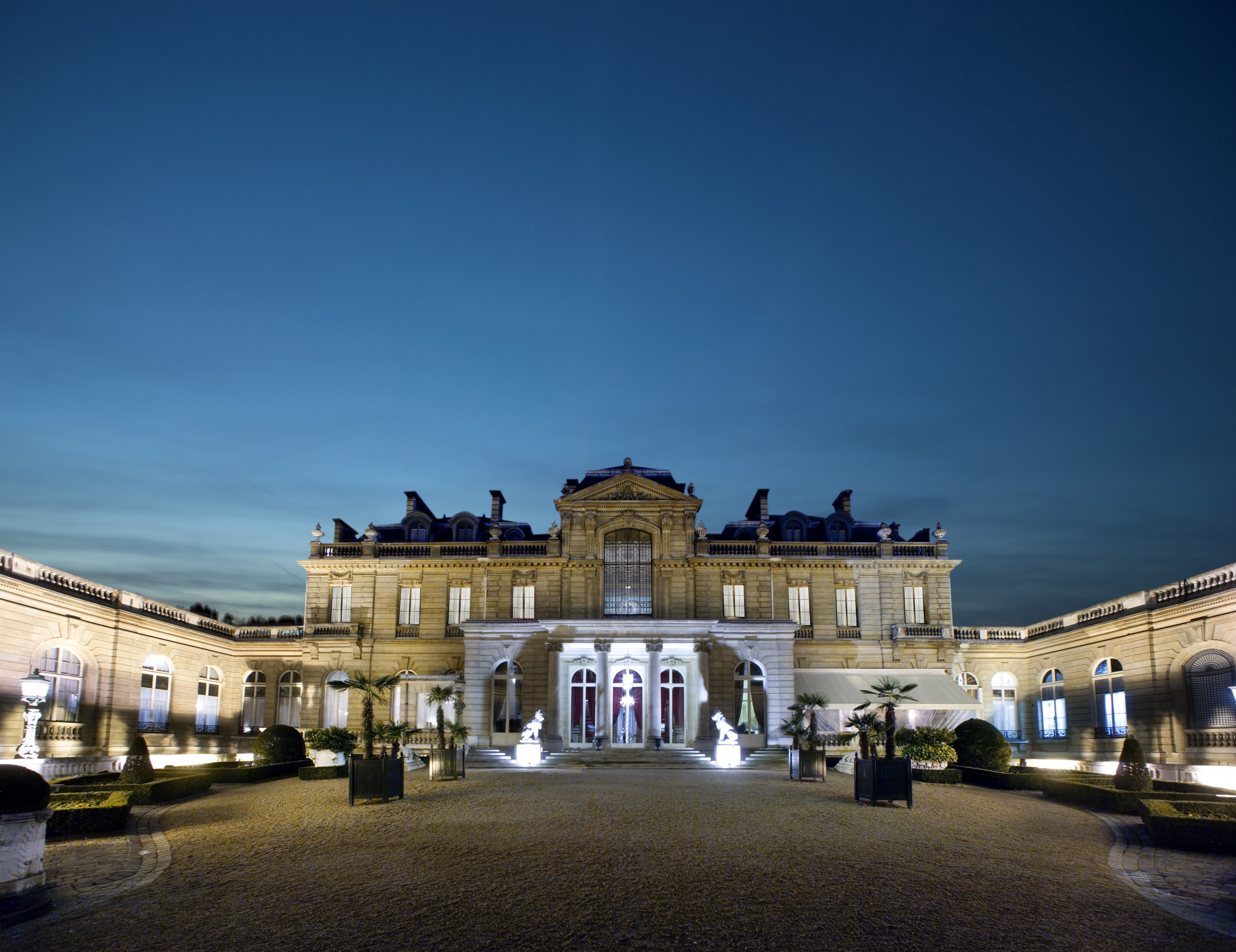
Musée Jacquemart André

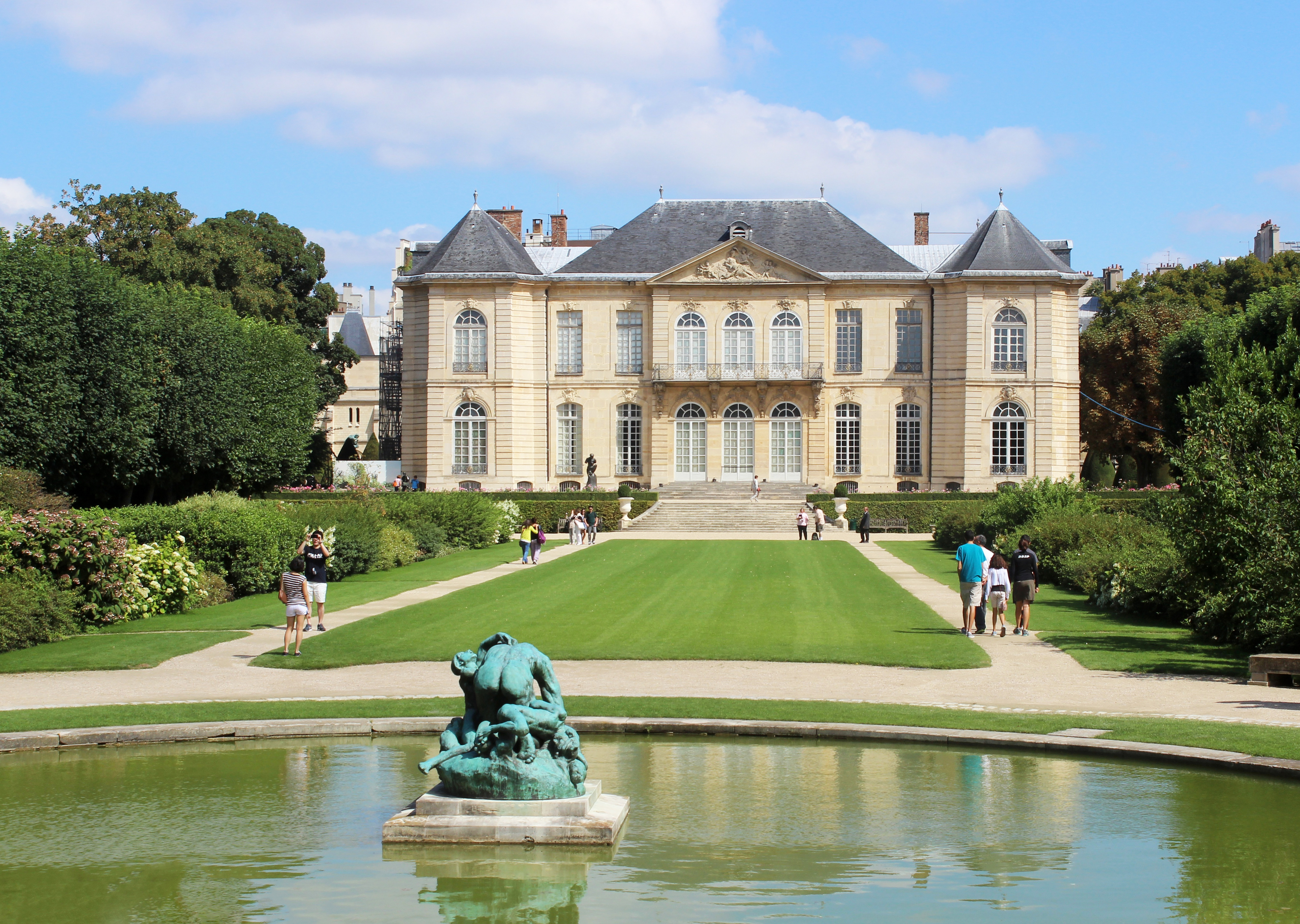
Hôtel Biron

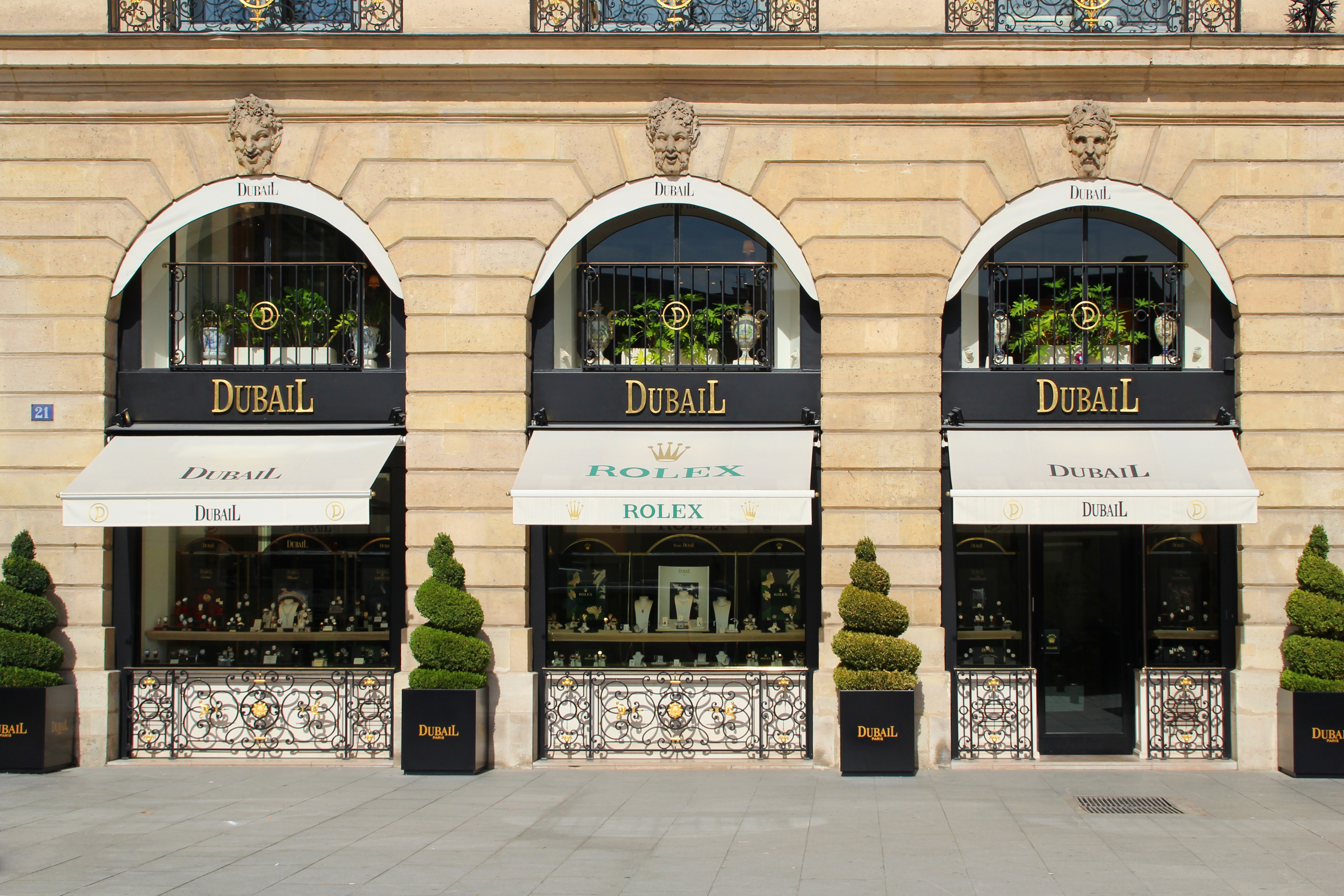
Hôtel de Fontpertuis

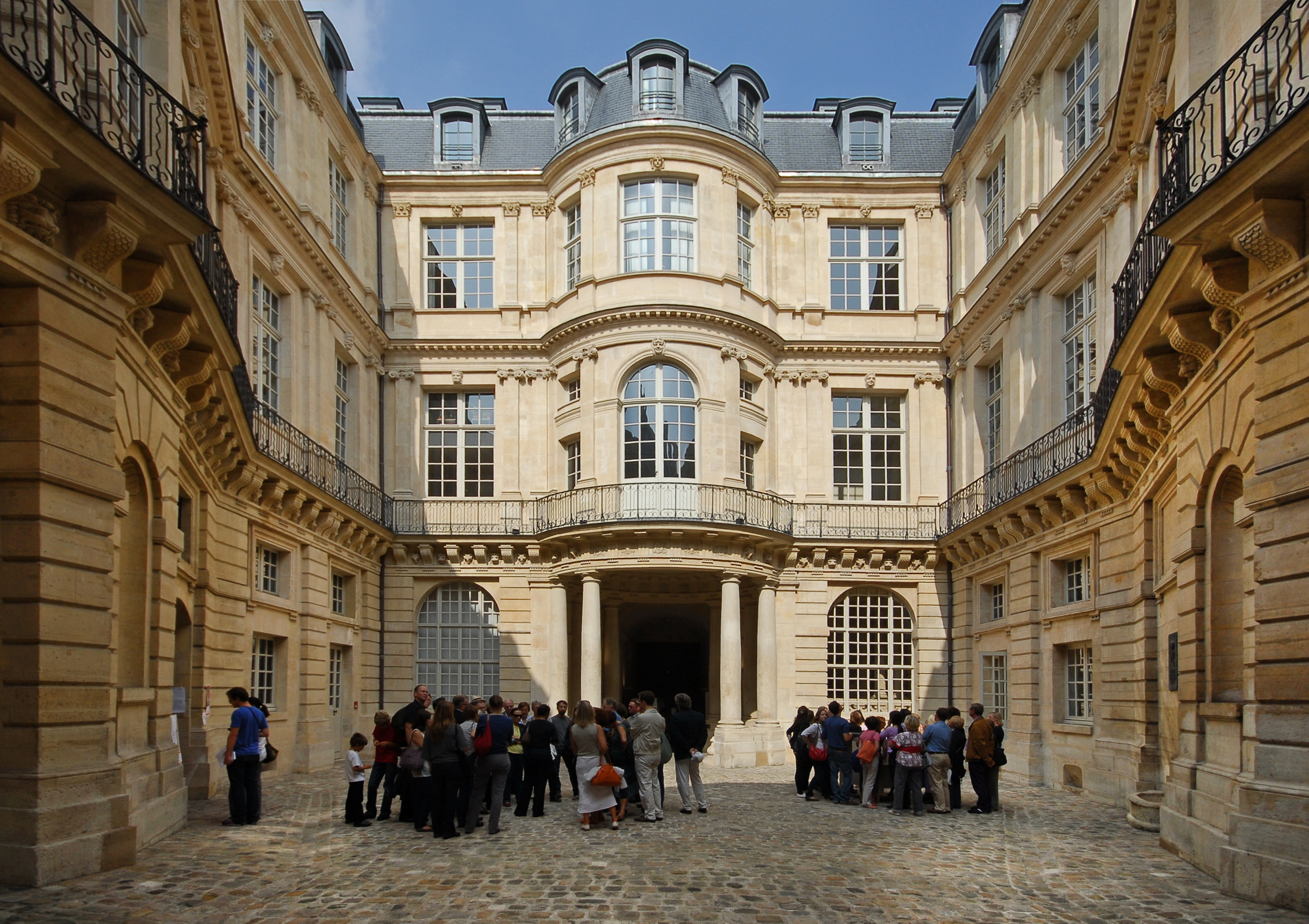
Hôtel de Beauvais

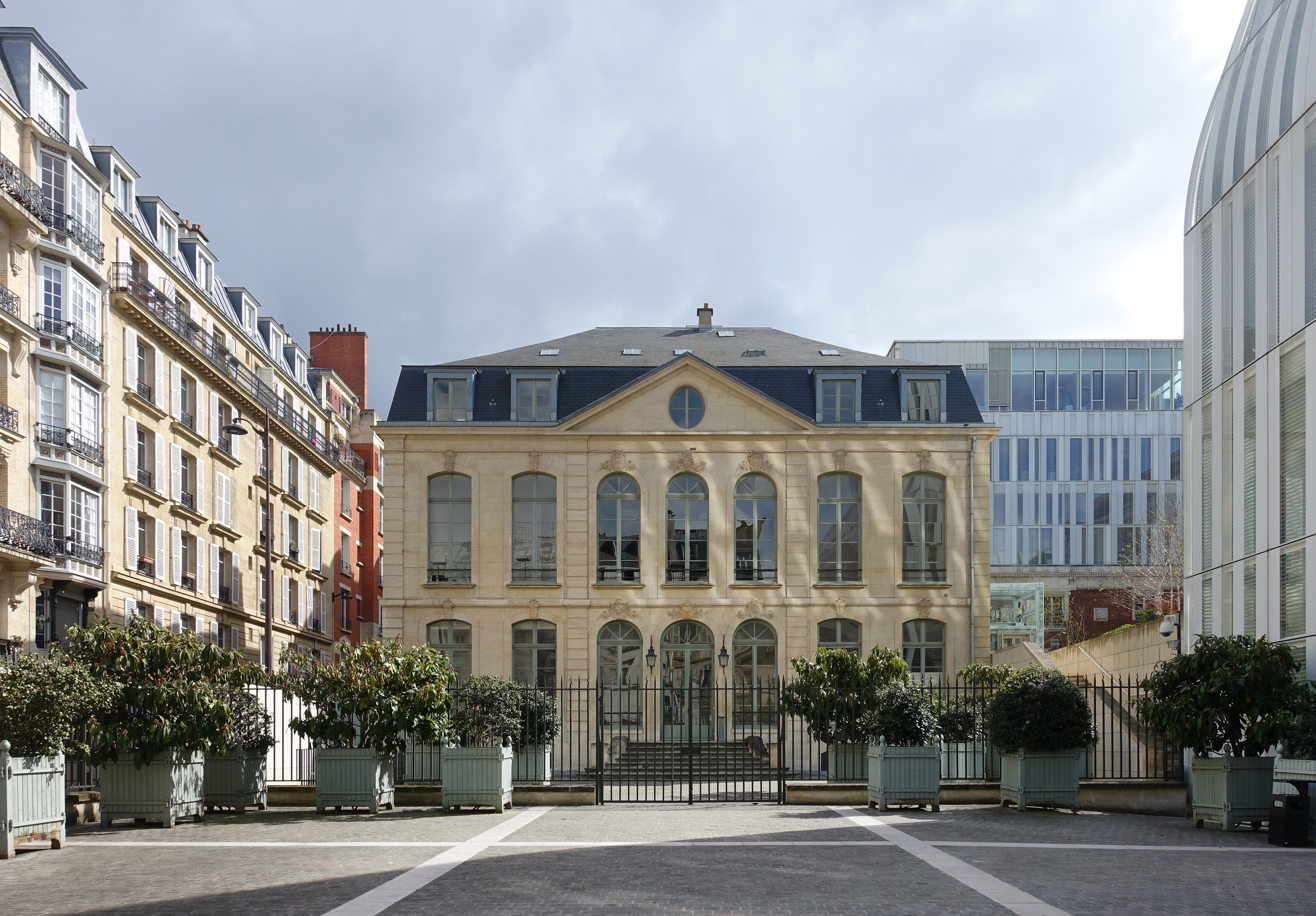
Hôtel de Choiseul-Praslin

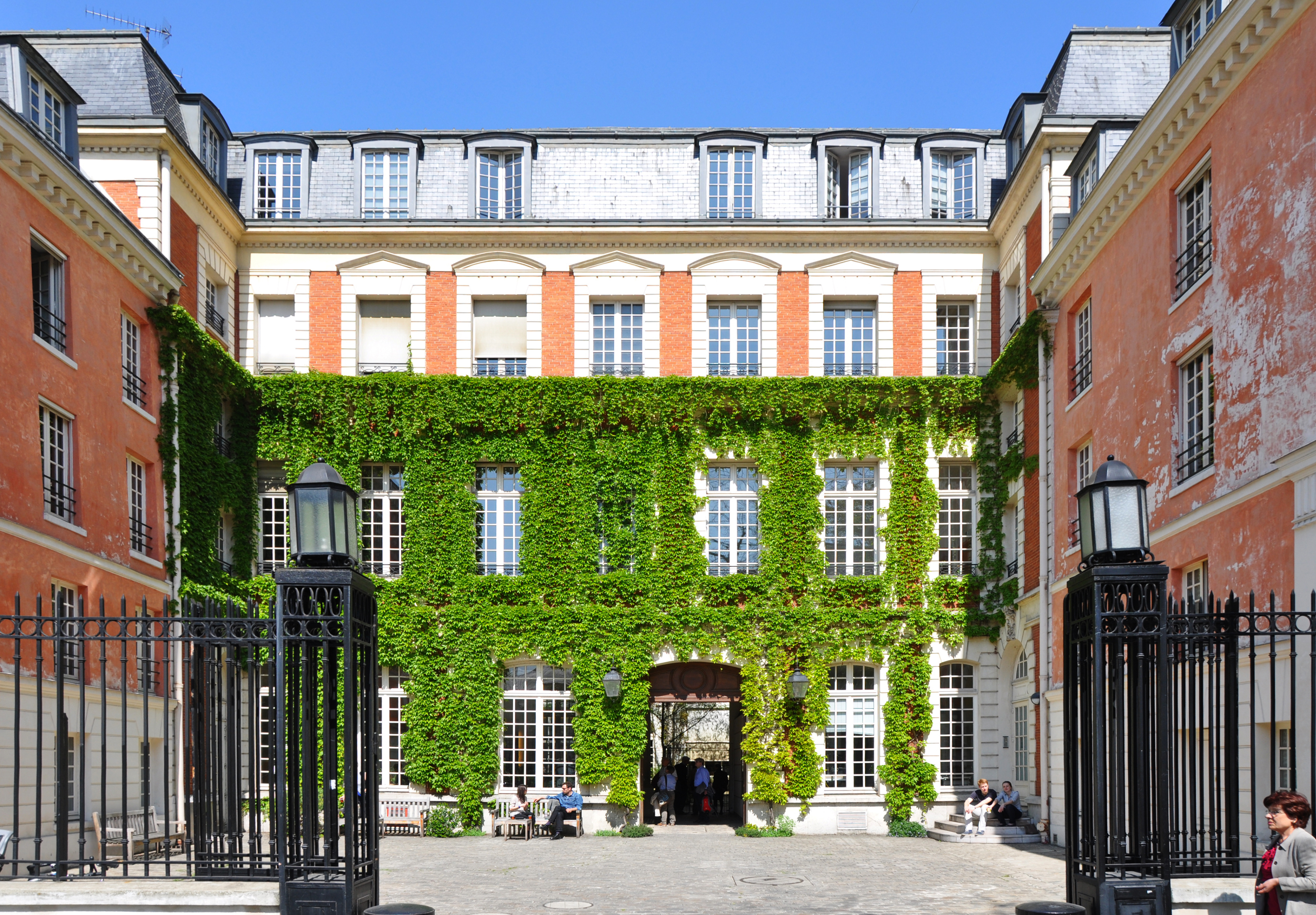
Hôtel Duret de Chevry

Hôtel Gouthière

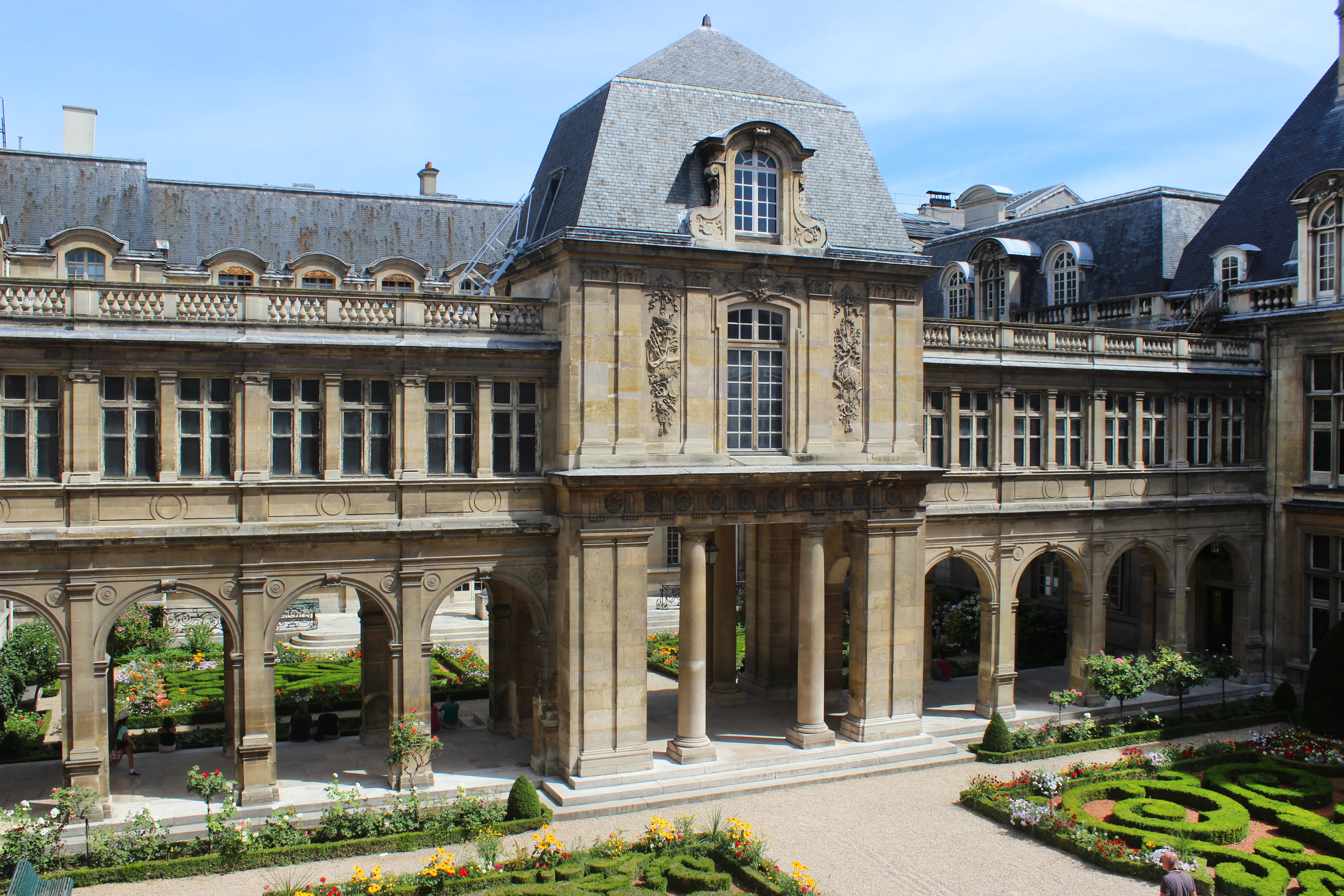
Hôtel Carnavalet

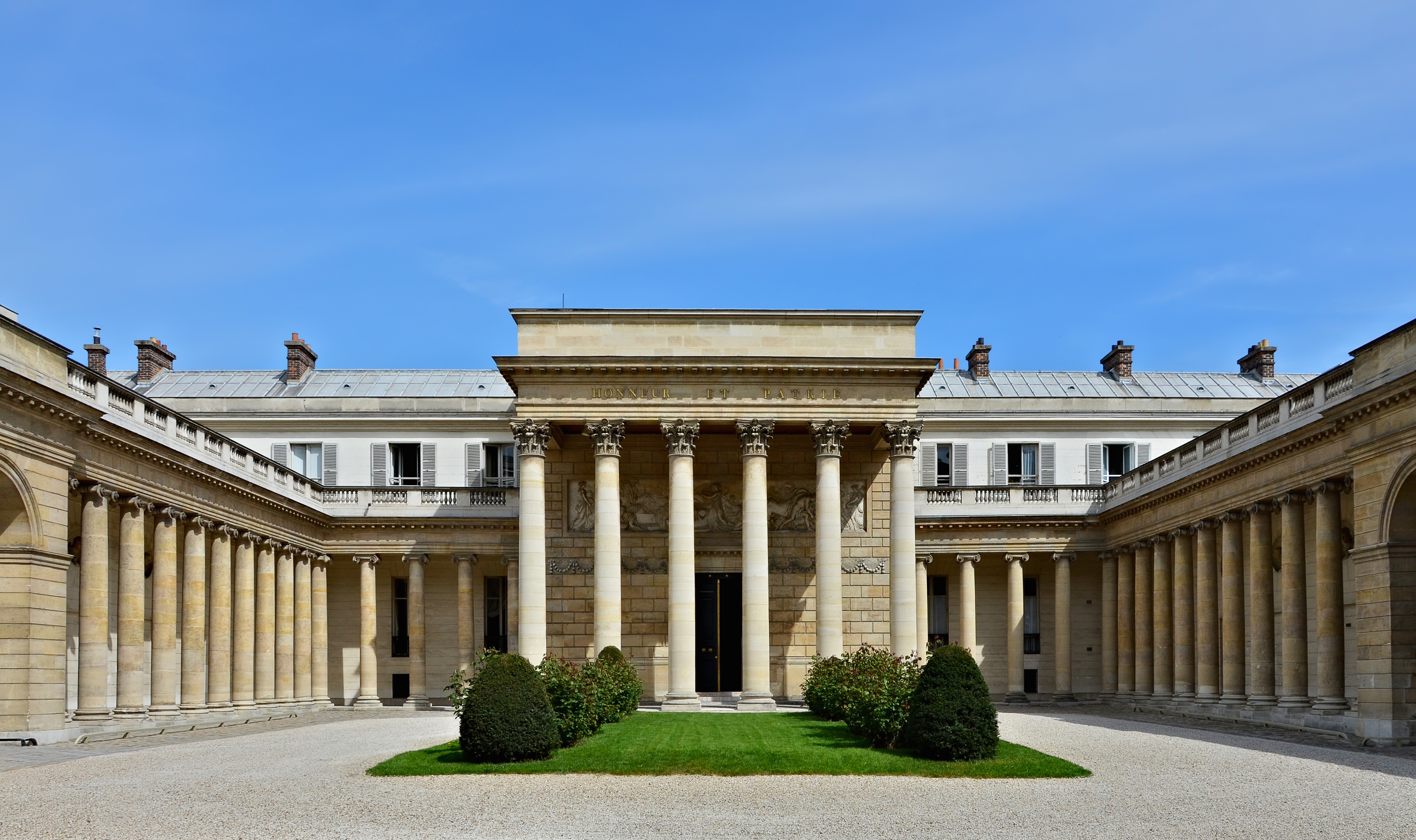
Hôtel de Salm

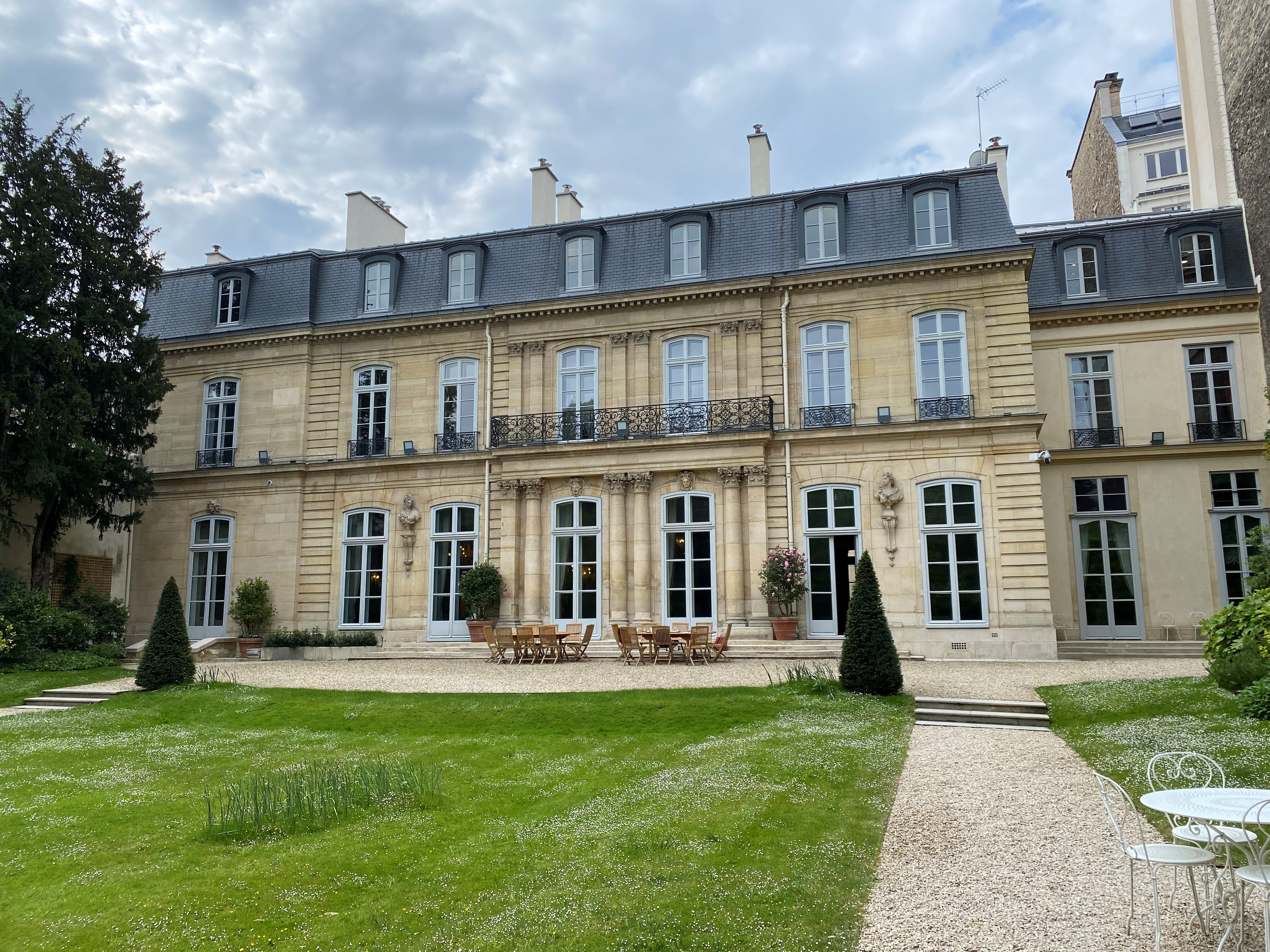
Hôtel de Besenval

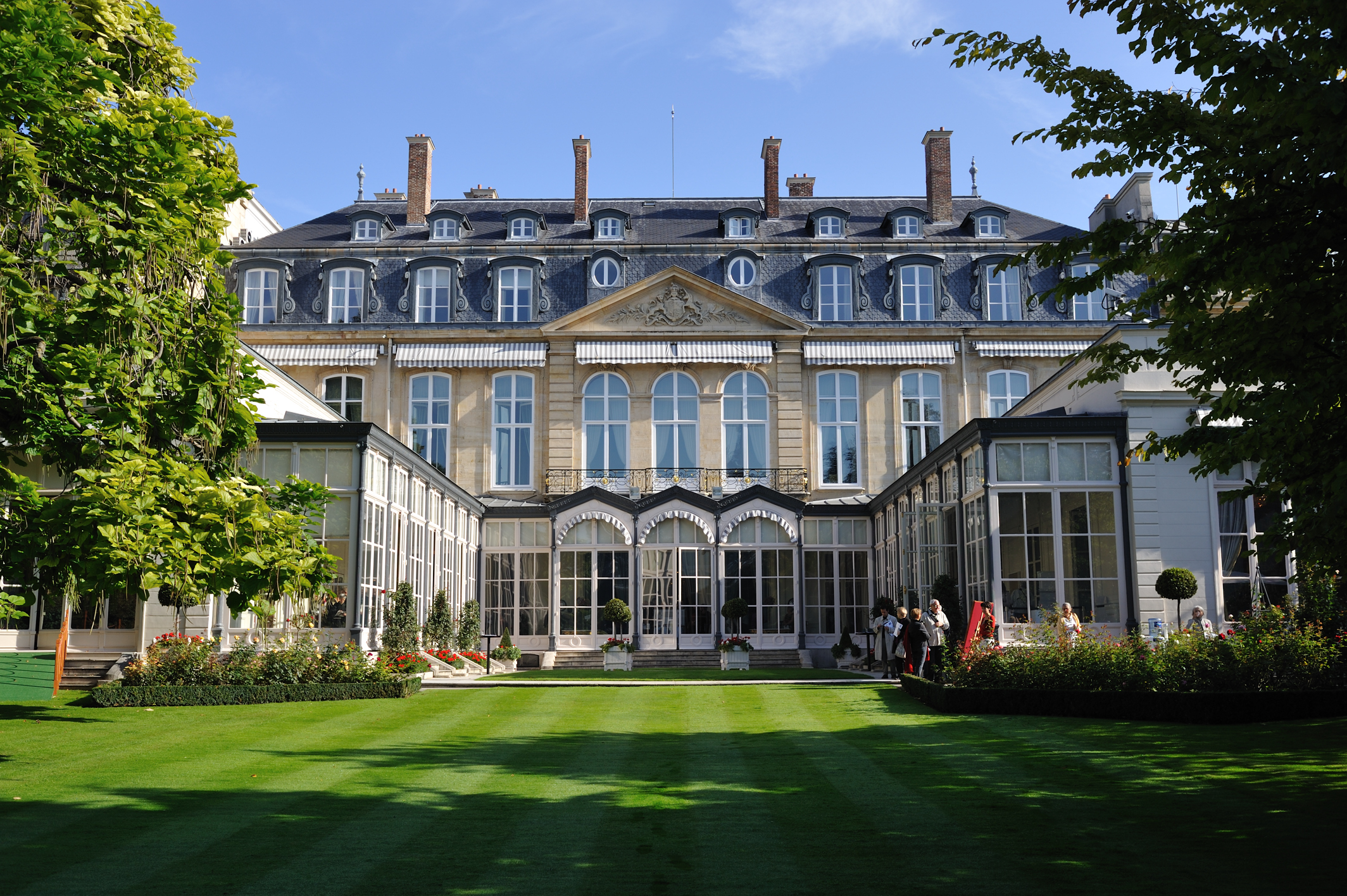
Hôtel de Charost

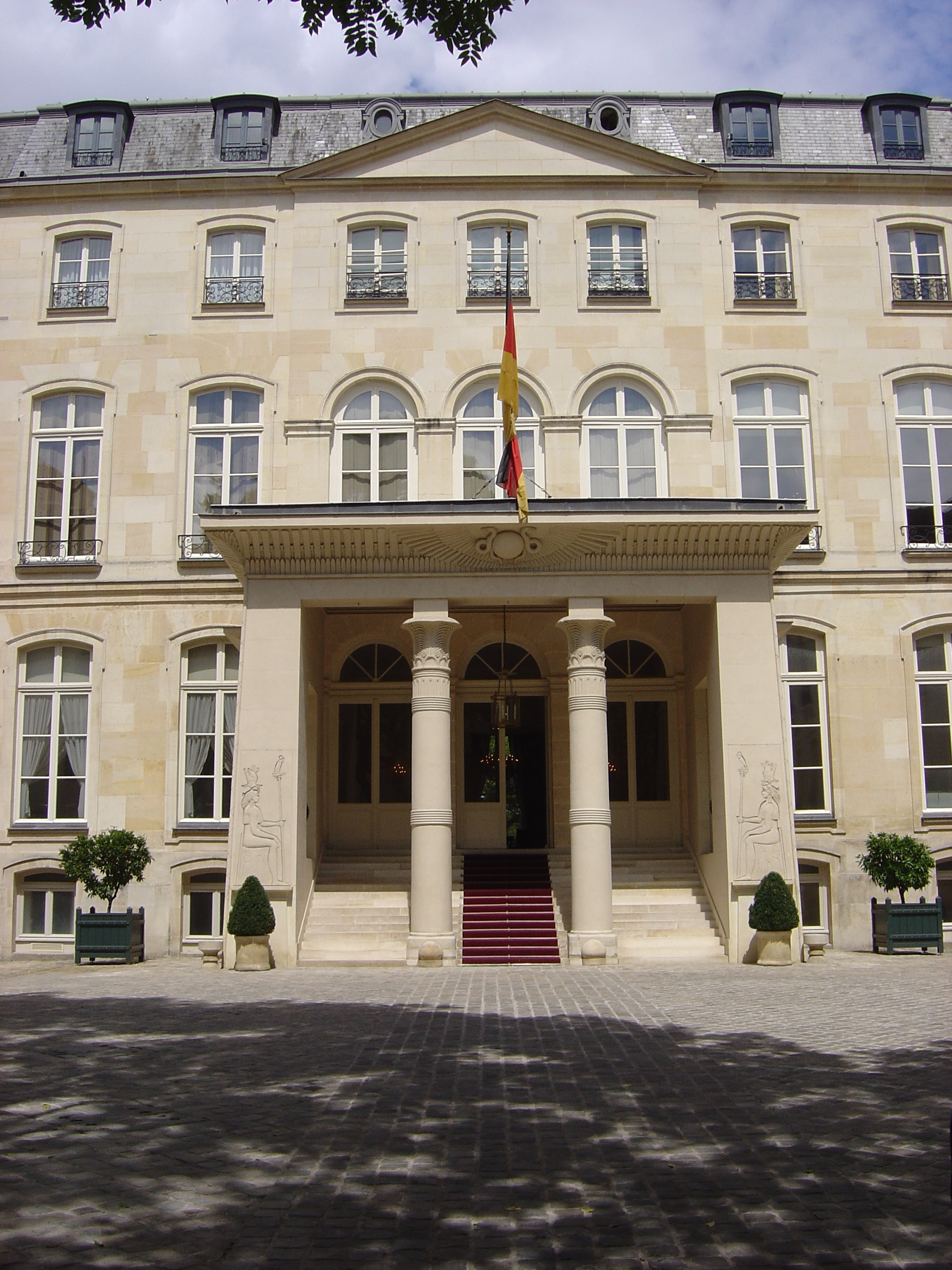
Hôtel Beauharnais

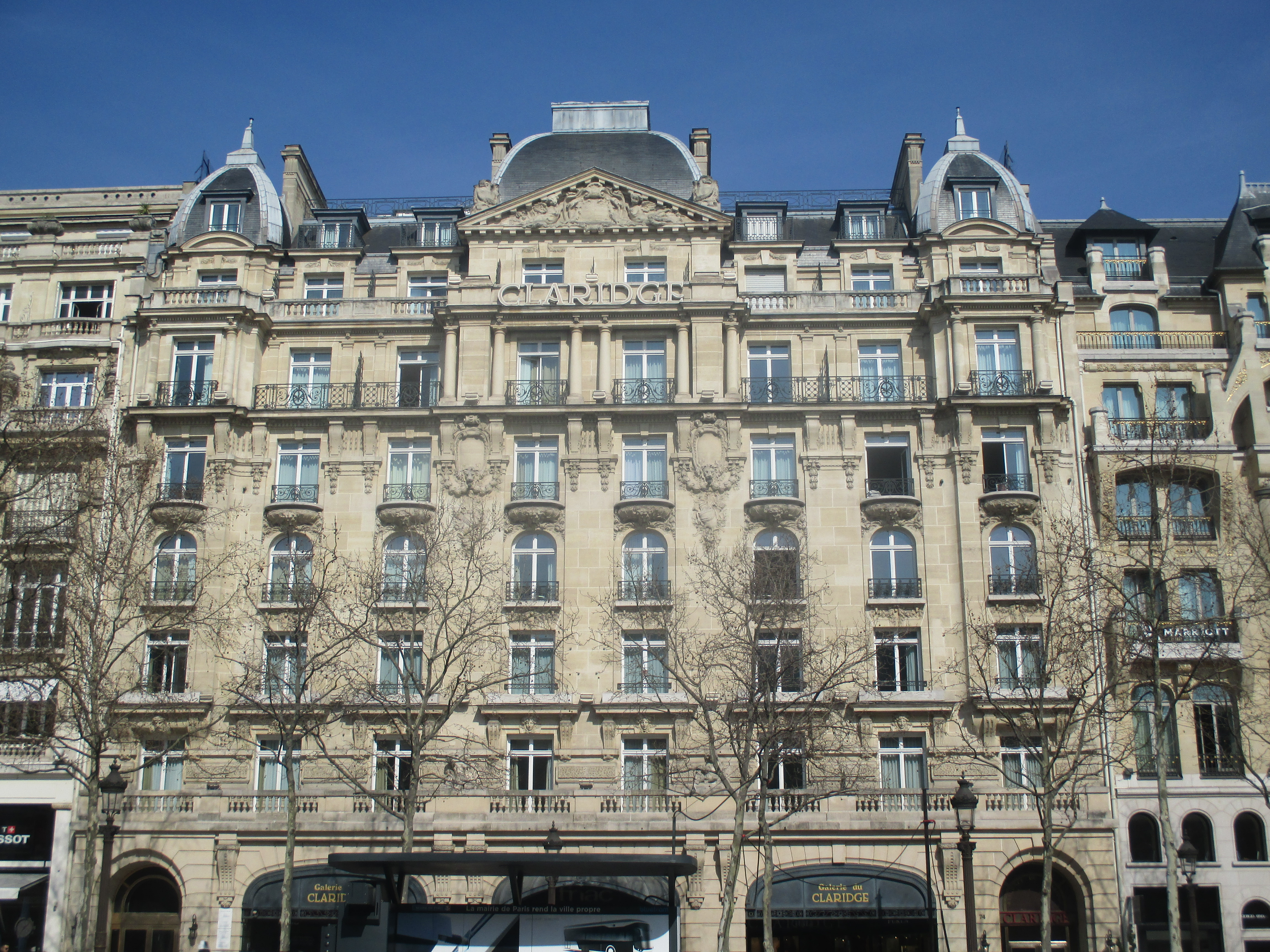
Hôtel Claridge

== Hôtels particuliers in Paris ==
=== Hôtels particuliers ===
Hôtel	Other names	Arrondissement	Address	Coordinates	Mérimée
Hôtel de l'abbé Dumoncais		11	136-138 rue Amelot; 7 rue Jean-Pierre-Timbaud	48°51′54″N 2°22′00″E	PA00086537
Hôtel d'Aguesseau		6	18 rue Séguier	48°51′13″N 2°20′30″E	PA00088631
Hôtel d'Aligre	Hôtel de Beauharnais; Hôtel de Maupéou; Hôtel d'Harlay	7	15 rue de l'Université	48°51′25″N 2°19′46″E	PA00088694
Hôtel d'Almeyras	Hôtel de Fourcy	3	30 rue des Francs-Bourgeois	48°51′29″N 2°21′36″E	PA00086117
Ambassade de République tchèque		7	15 avenue Charles-Floquet	48°51′21″N 2°17′44″E	
Hôtel Amelot de Bisseuil	Hôtel des Ambassadeurs de Hollande	4	47 rue Vieille-du-Temple	48°51′29″N 2°21′29″E	PA00086270
Hôtel du 68 rue Ampère		17	68 rue Ampère	48°53′07″N 2°17′56″E	PA75170006
Hôtel d'Angennes de Rambouillet		4	20 place des Vosges	48°51′21″N 2°22′00″E	PA00086271
Hôtel d'Angoulême Lamoignon	Hôtel Lamoignon; Hôtel d'Angoulême; Bibliothèque historique de la ville de Paris	4	24 rue Pavée	48°51′25″N 2°21′42″E	PA00086296
Hôtel d'Arvers		4	12 quai d'Orléans	48°51′05″N 2°21′19″E	PA00086273
Hôtel d'Asfeldt		4	16 place des Vosges	48°51′20″N 2°22′00″E	PA00086274
Hôtel d'Assy	Hôtel Marin de la Châtaigneraie	3	58 bis rue des Francs-Bourgeois	48°51′35″N 2°21′27″E	PA00086155
Hôtel d'Aubray	Hôtel de Brinvilliers	4	12 rue Charles-V	48°51′12″N 2°21′45″E	PA00086275
Hôtel d'Aumont		4	5-7 rue de Jouy	48°51′16″N 2°21′30″E	PA00086276
Hôtel d'Aumont		9	2, 2 bis rue de Caumartin; 30 boulevard des Capucines	48°52′13″N 2°19′41″E	PA00088910
Hôtel d'Auterive	Hôtel de Saint-Simon	7	3 rue de Beaune	48°51′32″N 2°19′48″E	PA00088750
Hôtel d'Avaray		7	85 rue de Grenelle	48°51′22″N 2°19′20″E	
Hôtel du 21 rue du Bac		7	21 rue du Bac	48°51′29″N 2°19′42″E	PA00088748
Hôtel du 99 rue du Bac		7	99 rue du Bac	48°51′11″N 2°19′26″E	PA00088802
Hôtel du 120 rue du Bac		7	120 rue du Bac	48°51′09″N 2°19′24″E	PA00088749
Hôtel du Barry		2	2 bis, 2 ter rue de la Jussienne	48°51′55″N 2°20′39″E	PA00086063
Hôtel de Bassompierre	Hôtel du Cardinal de Richelieu	3	23 place des Vosges	48°51′23″N 2°21′55″E	PA00086124
Hôtel Batailhe de Francès	Hôtel d'Affry; Hôtel de Vendôme	1	1 place Vendôme	48°52′01″N 2°19′43″E	PA00085808
Hôtel Baudard de Saint-James		1	12 place Vendôme	48°52′01″N 2°19′48″E	PA00085809
Hôtel Bauyn de Péreuse		1	5 place des Victoires	48°51′55″N 2°20′30″E	PA00085810
Hôtel de Béarn	Ambassade de Roumanie	7	123 rue Saint-Dominique; 22-24 avenue Bosquet; 1-15 rue de l'Exposition	48°51′31″N 2°18′11″E	PA00088803
Hôtel Beaubrun		3	17-19 rue Michel-le-Comte	48°51′44″N 2°21′20″E	PA00086169
Hôtel de Beauffremont		7	87 rue de Grenelle	48°51′22″N 2°19′18″E	PA00088692
Hôtel Beauharnais	Résidence de l'ambassadeur d'Allemagne	7	78 rue de Lille	48°51′39″N 2°19′20″E	PA00088693
Hôtel de Beauharnais		8	57 boulevard Haussmann; 32 rue des Mathurins	48°52′25″N 2°19′35″E	PA00088819
Hôtel de Beaune		6	7 rue du Regard; 70 boulevard Raspail	48°50′55″N 2°19′36″E	PA00088524
Hôtel Beautru de la Vieuville	Hôtel Bertin de Blagny	3	6 rue Pastourelle	48°51′45″N 2°21′36″E	PA00086170
Hôtel de Beauvais	Cour administrative d'appel de Paris	4	68 rue François-Miron	48°51′19″N 2°21′30″E	PA00086277
Hôtel de Beauvau	Hôtel du Ministère de l'Intérieur	8	Place Beauvau; Rue Cambacérès; 11 rue des Saussaies	48°52′19″N 2°19′01″E	PA00088873
Hôtel Bélanger		9	13, 15 rue Saint-Georges	48°52′31″N 2°20′13″E	PA00088911
Hôtel de Beligny		6	12 rue Guénégaud	48°51′20″N 2°20′17″E	PA00088525
Hôtel de Bérancourt	Hôtel de La Garde; Hôtel de Polignac	3	28 rue Charlot	48°51′45″N 2°21′44″E	PA00086119
Hôtel Bergeret de Grancourt		1	2 place des Victoires	48°51′56″N 2°20′26″E	PA00085811
Hôtel Bergeret de Talmont		1	4 place des Victoires	48°51′57″N 2°20′26″E	PA00085812
Hôtel de Bernis		9	28 place Saint-Georges	48°52′42″N 2°20′16″E	PA00088974
Hôtel Bertin		10	26 rue d'Hauteville	48°52′22″N 2°21′02″E	PA00086501
Hôtel de Bérulle		7	15 rue de Grenelle	48°51′11″N 2°19′43″E	PA00088696
Hôtel Béthune-Sully		4	62 rue Saint-Antoine	48°51′17″N 2°21′50″E	PA00086278
Bibliothèque de l'Arsenal	Pavillon de l'Arsenal	4	1-3 rue de Sully; 18 boulevard Morland	48°51′01″N 2°21′49″E	PA00086239
Bibliothèque Octavio-Paz	Bibliothèque de l'Institut Cervantès	16	11 avenue Marceau	48°51′58″N 2°17′57″E	PA75160006
Hôtel Biron	Hôtel du Maine; Musée Rodin	7	77 rue de Varenne	48°51′19″N 2°18′57″E	PA00088697
Hôtel Blémont	Société des auteurs et compositeurs dramatiques	9	5, 7 rue Ballu	48°52′54″N 2°19′51″E	PA00088924
Hôtel de Boffrand		1	24 place Vendôme	48°52′04″N 2°19′50″E	PA00085838
Hôtel du 19 rue Bonaparte		6	19 rue Bonaparte; Rue Visconti	48°51′21″N 2°20′04″E	PA00125454
Hôtel de Bondeville		3	4 rue des Haudriettes	48°51′41″N 2°21′27″E	PA00086121
Hôtel de Bonneval		3	14-16 rue du Parc-Royal	48°51′32″N 2°21′45″E	PA00086122
Hôtel Bony		9	32 rue de Trévise	48°52′30″N 2°20′46″E	PA00088912
Hôtel Botterel de Quintin	Hôtel de La Corée	10	44 rue des Petites-Écuries	48°52′27″N 2°20′59″E	PA00086502
Hôtel de Boullongne		1	23 place Vendôme	48°52′05″N 2°19′47″E	PA00085813
Hôtel du 17 quai de Bourbon		4	17 quai de Bourbon	48°51′10″N 2°21′21″E	PA00086320
Hôtel de Bourbon-Condé		7	12 rue Monsieur	48°51′03″N 2°18′58″E	PA00088698
Hôtel de Bourgogne	Hôtel des ducs de Bourgogne; Tour Jean-sans-Peur	2	20 rue Étienne-Marcel	48°51′51″N 2°20′53″E	PA00086026
Hôtel du 46 rue de Bourgogne		7	46 rue de Bourgogne	48°51′25″N 2°19′02″E	PA00088751
Hôtel Bourrienne		10	58 rue d'Hauteville	48°52′28″N 2°21′04″E	PA00086495
Hôtel de Bourvallais	Ministère de la Justice	1	11, 13 place Vendôme; 30, 34, 36 rue Cambon	48°52′05″N 2°19′40″E	PA00085814
Hôtel de Brancas		6	6 rue de Tournon	48°51′03″N 2°20′13″E	PA00088526
Hôtel de Breteuil (rue des Francs-Bourgeois)		3	58 rue des Francs-Bourgeois	48°51′35″N 2°21′28″E	PA00086155
Hôtel de Breteuil (avenue Foch)	Hôtel Le Tonnelier de Breteuil; Ambassade d'Irlande en France	16	12 avenue Foch	48°52′26″N 2°17′29″E	
Hôtel de Bretonvilliers		4	9 rue Saint-Louis-en-l'Île; 3 rue de Bretonvilliers	48°51′03″N 2°21′32″E	PA00086322
Hôtel de Brienne	Hôtel de Broglie; Ministère de la Défense	7	14-16 rue Saint-Dominique	48°51′35″N 2°19′10″E	PA00088699
Hôtel Bristol	Hôtel de Coëtlogon; Hôtel d'Orsigny	1	3, 5 place Vendôme; 360 rue Saint-Honoré; Rue de Castiglione	48°52′01″N 2°19′43″E	PA00085817
Hôtel de Broglie	Ministère des Droits des femmes	7	35-37 rue Saint-Dominique; 9-13 rue de Bourgogne; 30 bis, 32 rue Las Cases	48°51′34″N 2°19′07″E	PA00125455
Hôtel Brongniart		7	49 boulevard des Invalides	48°50′59″N 2°18′56″E	PA00088700
Hôtel de Brossier		3	12 rue Charlot	48°51′42″N 2°21′40″E	
Hôtel Brulart		4	25 rue des Écouffes	48°51′26″N 2°21′32″E	PA00086279
Hôtel Bullion	Hôtel de la Caisse d'epargne et de prévoyance	1	9 rue Coq-Héron	48°51′52″N 2°20′33″E	PA00085815
Hôtel de Bussy		6	58 rue Saint-André-des-Arts	48°52′35″N 2°20′46″E	
Hôtel de Cagliostro		3	1 rue Saint-Claude; 99 boulevard Beaumarchais	48°51′36″N 2°22′02″E	
Hôtel Cail	Mairie du 8e arrondissement	8	56 boulevard Malesherbes; 1, 1 bis, 3 rue de Lisbonne; 13 rue du Général-Foy	48°52′39″N 2°19′03″E	PA00088820
Hôtel de Cambacérès	Hôtel de Bragelongue	7	21 rue de l'Université; 2 rue de Montalembert; 2 rue Sébastien-Bottin	48°51′26″N 2°19′43″E	PA00088701
Hôtel de Camondo		8	61 rue de Monceau	48°52′43″N 2°18′44″E	PA00088821
Hôtel de Canillac	Hôtel Berruyer; Hôtel de Jassaud; Hôtel de Lamoignon; Hôtel de Coursin	3	4 rue du Parc-Royal; 55 rue de Turenne	48°51′31″N 2°21′50″E	PA00086120
Hôtel du Cardinal de Richelieu		3	21 place des Vosges	48°51′23″N 2°21′54″E	PA00086123
Hôtel Carnavalet		3	23 rue de Sévigné	48°51′27″N 2°21′44″E	PA00086125
Hôtel Cartier		8	8 place de la Concorde	48°52′02″N 2°19′17″E	PA00088822
Hôtel du 11 bis rue Casimir-Périer		7	11 bis rue Casimir-Périer	48°51′29″N 2°19′11″E	PA00088753
Hôtel de Cassini	Hôtel Pecci-Blunt	7	32 rue de Babylone	48°51′07″N 2°19′15″E	PA00088702
Hôtel de Castanier		1	19 rue des Capucines	48°52′09″N 2°19′43″E	
Hôtel de Castries	Hôtel de Broglie	7	72 rue de Varenne	48°51′19″N 2°19′10″E	PA00088703
Hôtel de Cavoye		7	52 rue des Saints-Pères	48°51′15″N 2°19′47″E	PA00088704
Hôtel de Chabannes	Hôtel de Flers	4	17 place des Vosges	48°51′22″N 2°21′52″E	PA00086466
Hôtel de Chalon-Luxembourg		4	26 rue Geoffroy-l'Asnier	48°51′17″N 2°21′25″E	PA00086280
Hôtel de Chambon		6	95 rue du Cherche-Midi	48°50′49″N 2°19′17″E	PA00088527
Hôtel Chanac de Pompadour	Hôtel de Besenval; Ambassade de Suisse	7	142 rue de Grenelle	48°51′29″N 2°18′57″E	PA00088705
Hôtel de Chanaleilles		7	2 rue de Chanaleilles; 24 rue Vaneau	48°51′12″N 2°19′08″E	PA00088706
Hôtel Charlemagne		1	1 place des Victoires	48°51′56″N 2°20′27″E	PA00085816
Hôtel Charles-Testu		6	26 rue de Condé	48°51′00″N 2°20′16″E	PA00088528
Hôtel du 15 rue Charles-V		4	15 rue Charles-V	48°51′11″N 2°21′45″E	
Hôtel de Charost		8	39 rue du Faubourg-Saint-Honoré	48°52′08″N 2°19′08″E	
Hôtel de Chaulnes	Hôtel Descures; Hôtel Nicolay-Goussainville	4	9 place des Vosges	48°51′19″N 2°21′51″E	PA00086282
Hôtel de Chavigny	Hôtel Poulletier	4	7-9 rue de Sévigné	48°51′21″N 2°21′42″E	PA00086283
Hôtel du Châtelet	Ministère du Travail	7	127 rue de Grenelle	48°51′28″N 2°18′57″E	PA00088707
Hôtel de Châtillon	Hôtel de Marie de Lyonne; Hôtel de Gagny; Hôtel Chatainville	4	10 place des Vosges	48°51′18″N 2°21′59″E	PA00086281
Hôtel de Chenizot		4	51-53 rue Saint-Louis-en-l'Île	48°51′08″N 2°21′20″E	PA00086284
Hôtel Chéret	Hôtel Akermann	10	30 rue du Faubourg-Poissonnière	48°52′23″N 2°20′53″E	PA00086496
Hôtel de Chimay		6	17 quai Malaquais	48°51′28″N 2°20′02″E	
Hôtel de Choiseul-Praslin	Musée Postal	6	111 rue de Sèvres; 2-8 rue Saint-Romain	48°50′52″N 2°19′13″E	PA00088627
Hôtel de Choudens		9	21 rue Blanche	48°52′21″N 2°20′25″E	PA00088913
Hôtel Clairambault	Hôtel Rambouillet de la Sablière	2	2 rue Vide-Gousset; 1 Rue d'Aboukir	48°51′57″N 2°20′29″E	PA00086035
Hôtel Claridge		8	74 avenue des Champs-Élysées	48°52′16″N 2°18′17″E	PA00088823
Hôtel Claude Aubert-Perrot		4	28 quai de Béthune	48°51′03″N 2°21′25″E	
Hôtel de Claude-Turcat		6	14 rue de Condé	48°51′04″N 2°20′17″E	PA00088529
Hôtel de Clermont		7	69 rue de Varenne; 6-8 rue Barbet-de-Jouy	48°51′19″N 2°19′04″E	PA00088708
Hôtel de Clermont-Tonnerre		4	18 place des Vosges	48°51′20″N 2°22′00″E	PA00086285
Hôtel de Clermont-Tonnerre		5	27 quai de la Tournelle	48°51′01″N 2°21′14″E	PA00088488
Hôtel de Clermont-Tonnerre		7	118 rue du Bac	48°51′09″N 2°19′24″E	PA00088709
Hôtel de Clisson		3	58 rue des Archives	48°51′38″N 2°21′27″E	PA00086155
Hôtel de Cluny		5	24 rue Du Sommerard	48°51′01″N 2°20′37″E	PA00088431
Hôtel de Coislin		8	4 place de la Concorde; 1 rue Royale	48°52′02″N 2°19′19″E	PA00088824
Hôtel Colbert		5	11 rue de la Bûcherie; 5-7 rue de l'Hôtel-Colbert	48°51′06″N 2°20′55″E	PA00088441
Hôtel Colbert de Torcy	Hôtel Tubeuf	2	16, 16 bis rue Vivienne	48°51′59″N 2°20′18″E	PA00086038
Hôtel Colbert de Villacerf		4	23 rue de Turenne	48°51′22″N 2°21′49″E	
Hôtel des Colonnes		8	38 avenue Gabriel	48°52′11″N 2°18′51″E	
Hôtel de Comans d'Astry		4	18 quai de Béthune	48°51′02″N 2°21′29″E	PA00086332
Hôtel des Comédiens ordinaires du roi		6	14 rue de l'Ancienne-Comédie	48°51′11″N 2°20′18″E	PA00088530
Hôtel Cornette	Hôtel Le Duc-Desnoues	2	12 place des Victoires	48°51′57″N 2°20′29″E	PA00086025
Hôtel Cornuel	Hôtel de Tourolle	3	7 rue Charlot	48°51′40″N 2°21′37″E	PA00086126
Hôtel Coulanges		4	1 bis place des Vosges; 11 bis rue de Birague	48°51′18″N 2°21′54″E	PA00086286
Hôtel de Coulanges	Hôtel Le Tellier; Hôtel Barbes; Hôtel Deniau de Fontenay	4	35-37 rue des Francs-Bourgeois	48°51′28″N 2°21′37″E	PA00086301
Hôtel du 12 rue de Courcelles		8	12 rue de Courcelles	48°52′26″N 2°18′39″E	PA00088840
Hôtel de Courteilles	Hôtel de Rochechouart; Ministère de l'Éducation nationale	7	110 rue de Grenelle	48°51′24″N 2°19′14″E	PA00088710
Hôtel de Crillon		8	10 place de la Concorde; 2 rue Boissy-d'Anglas	48°52′02″N 2°19′17″E	PA00088825
Hôtel de Croisilles		3	12 rue du Parc-Royal	48°51′31″N 2°21′47″E	PA00086127
Hôtel Cromot du Bourg		9	9-11 rue Cadet; 60 rue La Fayette	48°52′30″N 2°20′35″E	PA00088914
Hôtel de Crozat	Hôtel Ritz	1	17 place Vendôme	48°52′05″N 2°19′44″E	PA00085826
Hôtel Delaforest	Hôtel de La Forest Divonne; Hôtel Lebel	7	13 rue Vaneau	48°51′14″N 2°19′11″E	PA00125456
Hôtel Delisle-Mansart		3	22 rue Saint-Gilles	48°51′29″N 2°21′57″E	PA00086128
Hôtel Delpech de Chaunot		1	8 place Vendôme	48°52′00″N 2°19′47″E	PA00085818
Hôtel Demarne		18	8-14 rue Cortot	48°53′16″N 2°20′27″E	
Hôtel Dervieux		9	20 rue Joubert	48°52′29″N 2°19′48″E	PA00088958
Hôtel Desmarets		2	18 rue Vivienne	48°52′05″N 2°20′23″E	PA00086081
Hôtel du Docteur Coste		6	42 rue du Cherche-Midi	48°50′59″N 2°19′35″E	PA00088531
Hôtel Dodun		1	21 rue de Richelieu; 10 rue Molière	48°51′53″N 2°20′09″E	PA00085819
Hôtel de Donon		3	9 rue Payenne; 8 rue Elzévir	48°51′30″N 2°21′44″E	PA00086129
Hôtel Dosne-Thiers	Hôtel Thiers	9	27 place Saint-Georges	48°52′43″N 2°20′15″E	
Hôtel de Dreux-Brézé		6	1 rue du Regard; 64 boulevard Raspail	48°50′58″N 2°19′37″E	PA00088617
Hôtel Dubois de Courval		8	6 rue Paul-Baudry	48°52′19″N 2°18′26″E	
Hôtel Duché des Tournelles		1	18 place Vendôme	48°52′03″N 2°19′50″E	PA00085820
Hôtel Dupin	Hôtel des Vins	1	68 rue Jean-Jacques-Rousseau	48°51′51″N 2°20′39″E	PA00085893
Hôtel Duprat		7	60 rue de Varenne; 51 rue de Bellechasse	48°51′18″N 2°19′15″E	PA00088711
Hôtel Duret de Chevry		3	8 rue du Parc-Royal	48°51′31″N 2°21′49″E	
Hôtel Dyel des Hameaux		4	13 place des Vosges; 14 rue de Turenne	48°51′21″N 2°21′51″E	PA00086287
Hôtel d'Ecquevilly	Hôtel du Grand Veneur	3	60 rue de Turenne	48°51′33″N 2°21′53″E	PA00086224
Palais de l'Élysée	Hôtel d'Évreux	8	55-57 rue du Faubourg-Saint-Honoré	48°52′13″N 2°18′59″E	PA00088876
Grand Hôtel d'Entragues		6	12 rue de Tournon	48°50′59″N 2°20′13″E	PA00088641
Hôtel de l'Escalopier		3	25 place des Vosges	48°51′23″N 2°21′57″E	PA00086130
Hôtel d'Espinoy	Pavillon de la Reine	3	28 place des Vosges	48°51′23″N 2°21′58″E	PA00086131
Petit Hôtel d'Estrées		3	70 rue des Gravilliers	48°51′52″N 2°21′17″E	PA00086132
Hôtel d'Estrées		3	79 rue de Grenelle	48°51′19″N 2°19′22″E	
Hôtel de l'Europe et des Princes		2	97 rue de Richelieu	48°52′17″N 2°20′22″E	PA00086095
Hôtel d'Évreux	Hôtel du Crédit Foncier de France	1	19 place Vendôme	48°52′06″N 2°19′45″E	PA00085822
Hôtel de Fécamp	Hôtel des Abbés de Fécamp	6	5 rue Hautefeuille	48°51′09″N 2°20′35″E	PA00088522
Hôtel de Feydeau de Brou		7	13 rue de l'Université	48°51′25″N 2°19′47″E	
Hôtel de Feydeau de Marville		7	53 rue de Verneuil	48°51′31″N 2°19′36″E	
Hôtel Feydeau de Montholon		6	35 quai des Grands-Augustins; 2 rue Séguier	48°51′16″N 2°20′32″E	PA00088532
Hôtel Fieubet	École Massillon	4	2 quai des Célestins	48°51′06″N 2°21′44″E	PA00086256
Hôtel de Fleury	École nationale des ponts et chaussées	7	26-28 rue des Saints-Pères	48°51′20″N 2°19′51″E	PA00088685
Saint James Paris (former Fondation Thiers)		16	5 place du Chancelier-Adenauer	48°52′14″N 2°16′47″E	PA00086681
Hôtel Fontaine		14	83 avenue Denfert-Rochereau	48°50′09″N 2°20′03″E	PA00086627
Hôtel de Fontenay		3	56 rue des Francs-Bourgeois	48°51′34″N 2°21′28″E	PA00086155
Hôtel de Fontpertuis	Hôtel du Crédit Foncier de France	1	21 place Vendôme	48°52′06″N 2°19′45″E	PA00085822
Hôtel de Foretz	Hôtel Bullion	6	21 rue Hautefeuille	48°51′03″N 2°20′30″E	PA00088533
Hôtel du 9 rue Fortuny	Lycée professionnel d'esthétique et haute-couture	17	9 rue Fortuny	48°52′55″N 2°18′22″E	PA75170001
Hôtel de Fourcy		4	8 place des Vosges	48°51′18″N 2°21′59″E	PA00086289
Petit Hôtel de Fourcy		4	6 rue de Fourcy	48°51′17″N 2°21′33″E	PA00086288
Hôtel de France et de Choiseul		1	239-241 rue Saint-Honoré	48°52′00″N 2°19′40″E	PA00085823
Hôtel de Furstemberg	Palais abbatial de Saint-Germain-des-Prés	6	3-7 rue de l'Abbaye	48°51′14″N 2°20′08″E	PA00088651
Hôtel Gaillard		17	1 place du Général-Catroux	48°52′54″N 2°18′37″E	PA75170003
Hôtel Gaillard de la Bouëxière		1	28 place Vendôme; 37 rue Danielle-Casanova	48°52′05″N 2°19′49″E	PA00085824
Hôtel de Galliffet		7	73 rue de Grenelle	48°51′17″N 2°19′24″E	
Hôtel de Gargan		1	37 rue Saint-Roch	48°51′59″N 2°19′57″E	PA00085825
Hôtel de Garsaulan		6	5 quai Malaquais	48°51′27″N 2°20′09″E	PA00088534
Hôtel Gégault de Crisenoy		3	16 rue des Quatre-Fils	48°51′39″N 2°21′34″E	PA00086133
Hôtel Genou de Guiberville		4	2 place des Vosges	48°51′18″N 2°21′56″E	PA00086290
Hôtel Gigault de La Salle	Hôtel André-d'Arbelles; Hôtel Biliotti	2	10 place des Victoires; 8 rue des Petits-Pères	48°51′58″N 2°20′28″E	PA00086027
Hôtel Gouffier de Thoix		7	56 rue de Varenne	48°51′17″N 2°19′17″E	PA00088712
Hôtel de Gourgues		3	52, 54 rue de Turenne	48°51′31″N 2°21′53″E	PA00086134
Hôtel de Gournay	Hôtel de Mortemart; Hôtel d'Aguesseau; Hôtel d'Haussonville; Hôtel de Turigny	7	1 rue Saint-Dominique	48°51′27″N 2°19′24″E	PA00088713
Hôtel Gourron		17	23 ter boulevard Berthier	48°53′18″N 2°18′02″E	PA00086732
Hôtel Gouthière		10	6 rue Pierre-Bullet	48°52′18″N 2°21′30″E	PA00086497
Hôtel de Gramont	Hôtel Ritz	1	15 place Vendôme	48°52′05″N 2°19′44″E	PA00085826
Hôtel Guadet		16	95 boulevard Murat	48°50′25″N 2°15′23″E	PA00086671
Hôtel de Guénégaud	Hôtel Pénautier	3	60 rue des Archives; 24-30 rue des Quatre-Fils	48°51′41″N 2°21′31″E	PA00086135
Hôtel de la Guiche		6	15 rue du Regard	48°50′53″N 2°19′37″E	
Hôtel Guimard	Hôtel d'Hector Guimard	16	122 avenue Mozart	48°50′59″N 2°15′59″E	PA00086680
Hôtel de Gunsburg		17	7 rue de Tilsitt; 2 avenue Mac-Mahon	48°52′30″N 2°17′42″E	PA00086723
Hôtel Halévy		9	22 rue de Douai	48°52′56″N 2°20′03″E	PA00088949
Hôtel d'Hallwyll		3	28 rue Michel-le-Comte; 17 rue de Montmorency	48°51′45″N 2°21′18″E	PA00086136
Hôtel d'Hasselin		4	24 quai de Béthune	48°51′03″N 2°21′26″E	PA00086333
Hôtel d'Hercule	Hôtel de Savoie	6	5-7 rue des Grands-Augustins	48°51′17″N 2°20′28″E	PA00088535
Hôtel Hérouet		3	54 rue Vieille-du-Temple; 42 rue des Francs-Bourgeois	48°51′31″N 2°21′33″E	PA00086138
Hôtel Heuzé de Vologer		1	4 place Vendôme	48°52′00″N 2°19′45″E	PA00085830
Hôtel d'Hozier	Hôtel d'Epernon	3	110 rue Vieille-du-Temple; 9 rue Debelleyme	48°51′40″N 2°21′47″E	PA00086137
Hôtel du 5 place d'Iéna		16	5 place d'Iéna	48°51′52″N 2°17′35″E	PA00086677
Hôtel de l'Impératrice Eugénie	Hôtel du Baron Hirsch	8	2 rue de l'Élysée	48°52′08″N 2°19′00″E	PA00132980
Hôtel de Jarnac		7	8 rue Monsieur	48°51′04″N 2°18′58″E	PA00088715
Hôtel de Jassaud		4	19 quai de Bourbon; 26 rue Le Regrattier	48°51′10″N 2°21′20″E	PA00086291
Hôtel Jassedé		16	41 rue Chardon-Lagache	48°50′36″N 2°15′56″E	PA00086672
Hôtel de Jaucourt		3	54 rue des Francs-Bourgeois	48°51′34″N 2°21′29″E	PA00086155
Hôtel Jean Bart		3	4 rue Chapon	48°51′48″N 2°21′26″E	PA00086139
Hôtel du 33 rue Jean-Goujon		8	33 rue Jean-Goujon	48°51′55″N 2°18′17″E	
Hôtel Jeanne d'Albret		4	31 rue des Francs-Bourgeois	48°51′27″N 2°21′39″E	PA00086292
Hôtel du Jeu de Paume		4	54 rue Saint-Louis-en-l'Île	48°51′07″N 2°21′22″E	PA00086467
Hôtel Judic		9	12 rue du Cardinal-Mercier	48°52′52″N 2°19′48″E	PA00088926
Hôtel Kinski	Hôtel Kunsky	7	53 rue Saint-Dominique	48°51′35″N 2°18′58″E	PA00088716
Hôtel de L'Hospital	Hôtel de Pomponne; Hôtel de Massiac	2	9 place des Victoires	48°51′57″N 2°20′30″E	PA00086028
Hôtel de La Fare		1	14 place Vendôme	48°52′02″N 2°19′49″E	PA00085827
Hôtel de La Feuillade		2	4 rue La Feuillade	48°51′58″N 2°20′25″E	PA00086064
Hôtel de La Feuillade		7	101 rue du Bac	48°51′11″N 2°19′26″E	PA00088717
Hôtel de La Porte	Musée du Barreau de Paris	1	25 rue du Jour; 15 rue Montmartre	48°51′52″N 2°20′42″E	PA00085835
Hôtel de La Trémoille		16	1 boulevard Delessert	48°51′33″N 2°17′16″E	
Hôtel de La Vaupalière		8	25 avenue Matignon; 85 rue du Faubourg-Saint-Honoré	48°52′17″N 2°18′48″E	PA00088836
Hôtel Laffemas		4	22 place des Vosges; Rue du Pas-de-la-Mule	48°51′21″N 2°22′00″E	PA00086293
Hôtel Lafont	Hôtel de Breteuil; Hôtel Dangeau; Hôtel de Missan; Hôtel de Sainson	4	12 place des Vosges	48°51′19″N 2°22′00″E	PA00086294
Hôtel de Laigue	Hôtel du Président Talon; Hôtel de Créqui; Hôtel de Béthune	7	16 rue Saint-Guillaume	48°51′19″N 2°19′46″E	PA00088758
Hôtel Lalique		8	40 cours Albert-Ier	48°51′54″N 2°18′16″E	PA00088838
Hôtel de Lamballe		16	16 avenue de Lamballe	48°51′17″N 2°16′52″E	
Hôtel Lambert		4	2 rue Saint-Louis-en-l'Île	48°51′02″N 2°21′35″E	PA00086295
Hôtel Landolfo-Carcano	Ambassade du Qatar	8	1 rue de Tilsitt	48°52′25″N 2°17′49″E	PA00088826
Hôtel de Lannion		7	75 rue de Lille	48°51′35″N 2°19′30″E	PA00088755
Hôtel de Lassay		7	35 quai d'Orsay	48°51′44″N 2°19′02″E	
Hôtel de Latour-Maubourg		1	10 place Vendôme	48°52′00″N 2°19′48″E	PA00085828
Hôtel de Laubespin		7	78 rue de l'Université	48°51′33″N 2°19′29″E	PA00088719
Hôtel de Launay		4	12 rue des Lions-Saint-Paul	48°51′09″N 2°21′44″E	PA00135365
Hôtel de Lauzun	Hôtel de Pimodan	4	17 quai d'Anjou	48°51′06″N 2°21′32″E	PA00086297
Hôtel Le Brun		5	49 rue du Cardinal-Lemoine	48°50′49″N 2°21′09″E	PA00088432
Hôtel Le Charron	Hôtel de Vitry	4	13-15 quai de Bourbon	48°51′09″N 2°21′22″E	PA00086298
Hôtel Le Duc de Biéville	Hôtel de Biéville	9	10 rue de la Grange-Batelière	48°52′23″N 2°20′31″E	PA00089009
Hôtel Le Ferron	Hôtel de Brabançois	3	20 rue des Quatre-Fils; 9 ruelle Sourdis	48°51′40″N 2°21′32″E	PA00086140
Hôtel Le Lièvre	Hôtel de La Grange	3	4-6 rue de Braque	48°51′39″N 2°21′25″E	PA00086141
Hôtel Le Maître		8	7 rue Saint-Florentin	48°52′02″N 2°19′26″E	
Hôtel Le Marois		8	9-11 avenue Franklin-D.-Roosevelt	48°51′58″N 2°18′36″E	
Hôtel Le Peletier de Saint-Fargeau		3	29 rue de Sévigné; 14 rue Payenne	48°51′29″N 2°21′48″E	PA00086143
Hôtel Le Pelletier de Souzy		3	76 rue des Archives; 19-21 rue Pastourelle	48°51′45″N 2°21′35″E	PA00086144
Hôtel Le Rebours		4	12 rue Saint-Merri	48°51′34″N 2°21′12″E	PA00086300
Hôtel Le Tellier		2	5 rue du Mail	48°51′59″N 2°20′30″E	PA00086040
Hôtel Le Vavasseur		16	21 rue Boissière	48°51′58″N 2°17′30″E	PA00086673
Hôtel Leblanc-Barbedienne		10	63 rue de Lancry	48°52′21″N 2°21′47″E	PA00086498
Hôtel Lefebure de la Malmaison		4	20 quai de Béthune	48°51′02″N 2°21′28″E	PA00086299
Hôtel Lejeune		18	28 avenue Junot; 22 rue Simon-Dereure	48°53′20″N 2°20′10″E	PA00086744
Hôtel Lemarié d'Aubigny		3	15 rue Barbette	48°51′33″N 2°21′36″E	PA00086142
Hôtel Lesseville	Hôtel de Chatillon; Hôtel Lamoignon	5	65 rue Galande	48°51′07″N 2°20′48″E	PA00088430
Hôtel Libéral Bruant	Musée Bricart	3	1 rue de la Perle; 1 place de Thorigny	48°51′33″N 2°21′43″E	PA00086145
Hôtel de Longueville		5	289 rue Saint-Jacques	48°50′24″N 2°20′26″E	PA00088433
Hôtel du 3 rue Louis-le-Grand		2	3 rue Louis-le-Grand	48°52′06″N 2°19′55″E	PA00086039
Hôtel du Lude	Hôtel de Chatillon	3	13 rue Payenne	48°51′31″N 2°21′45″E	PA00086146
Hôtel Lulli		1	45 rue des Petits-Champs; 47 rue Sainte-Anne	48°52′01″N 2°20′08″E	PA00085829
Hôtel de Luynes	Hôtel Séguier; Hôtel d'O	6	5 rue Gît-le-Cœur	48°51′15″N 2°20′35″E	PA75060006
Hôtel de Luzy		6	6 rue Férou	48°50′58″N 2°20′02″E	PA00088536
Hôtel Machelet de Velye		6	10 rue de Condé	48°51′05″N 2°20′18″E	PA00088537
Hôtel de Mademoiselle Duchesnois		9	3 rue de la Tour-des-Dames	48°52′40″N 2°20′02″E	PA00088915
Hôtel de Mademoiselle Mars		9	1 rue de la Tour-des-Dames; 7 rue de La Rochefoucauld	48°52′40″N 2°20′03″E	PA00088916
Hôtel de Maillé		4	10 rue Charles-V	48°51′11″N 2°21′47″E	
Hôtel de Mailly-Nesle		7	29 quai Voltaire; 2-4 rue de Beaune	48°51′33″N 2°19′48″E	PA00088720
Hôtel de Maisons	Hôtel de Soyecourt; Hôtel Pozzo di Borgo; Hôtel des Présidents de Maisons	7	51 rue de l'Université	48°51′31″N 2°19′31″E	PA00088741
Hôtel Marcel Dassault		8	7 rond-point des Champs-Élysées	48°52′07″N 2°18′32″E	
Hôtel Marchand		4	15 place des Vosges; 16 rue de Turenne	48°51′21″N 2°21′52″E	PA00086303
Hôtel des Maréchaux		9	13-17 rue Richer	48°52′27″N 2°20′47″E	PA00089010
Hôtel de Marigny		8	23 avenue de Marigny	48°52′14″N 2°18′55″E	PA00088896
Hôtel Marin-Delahaye	Hôtel de la Haye; Hôtel Radix de Sainte-Foix	9	1-3 rue de Caumartin; 2 boulevard de la Madeleine	48°52′13″N 2°19′40″E	PA00088927
Hôtel de la Marine	Hôtel du Garde-Meuble	8	Place de la Concorde; 2 rue Royale	48°52′00″N 2°19′22″E	PA00088817
Hôtel de Marle	Centre culturel suédois Hôtel de Noirmoutier	3	11 rue Payenne; 10 rue Elzévir	48°51′30″N 2°21′45″E	PA00086147
Hôtel Marquet de Bourgade		1	2 place Vendôme	48°52′00″N 2°19′44″E	PA00085830
Hôtel de Marsilly		6	18 rue du Cherche-Midi	48°51′03″N 2°19′42″E	PA00088566
Hôtel de Martignac		7	107 rue de Grenelle	48°51′25″N 2°19′08″E	PA00088721
Hôtel de Massa	Société des gens de lettres	14	38 rue du Faubourg-Saint-Jacques	48°50′10″N 2°20′15″E	PA00086619
Hôtel de Masseran	Hôtel de Beaumont	7	11 rue Masseran; 2 rue Duroc	48°50′54″N 2°18′52″E	PA00088695
Hôtel Matignon		7	57 rue de Varenne	48°51′16″N 2°19′15″E	PA00088722
Hôtel de Mayenne	Lycée des Francs-Bourgeois	4	21 rue Saint-Antoine; 38, 40 rue du Petit-Musc	48°51′12″N 2°21′56″E	PA00086305
Hôtel Mégret de Sérilly		3	106 rue Vieille-du-Temple	48°51′39″N 2°21′46″E	PA00086148
Hôtel Meiland		4	19 quai d'Anjou; 20 rue Poulletier	48°51′06″N 2°21′31″E	PA00086306
Hôtel de Mercy-Argenteau		9	16 boulevard Montmartre	48°52′19″N 2°20′28″E	PA00088917
Hôtel de Metz de Rosnay	Hôtel de Forceville; Hôtel Vigier	2	4 bis place des Victoires; 2 rue La Feuillade	48°51′57″N 2°20′26″E	PA00086029
Hôtel Mezzara		16	60 rue Jean-de-La-Fontaine	48°51′02″N 2°16′15″E	PA00086674
Hôtel de Michel Simon	Hôtel de Montescot	3	70 rue des Archives	48°51′43″N 2°21′33″E	PA00086149
Hôtel du ministre des Affaires étrangères		7	37 quai d'Orsay	48°51′44″N 2°18′58″E	PA00088723
Hôtel de Miramion	Musée de l'Assistance publique	5	47-53 quai de la Tournelle	48°51′02″N 2°21′07″E	PA00088434
Hôtel de Montalembert	Hôtel de Valmy	7	40 rue du Bac	48°52′07″N 2°20′52″E	
Hôtel Moïse de Camondo	Musée Nissim de Camondo	8	61 bis, 63 rue de Monceau	48°52′44″N 2°18′46″E	PA00088828
Hôtel de Monaco		7	57 rue Saint-Dominique	48°51′33″N 2°18′55″E	
Hôtel de Mondragon		2	3 rue d'Antin	48°52′06″N 2°19′57″E	PA00086030
Hôtel de Mongelas		3	62 rue des Archives	48°51′41″N 2°21′31″E	
Hôtel de Monpelas	Ambassade de l'Angola	16	19 avenue Foch	48°52′21″N 2°17′22″E	PA00086675
Hôtel de Montalivet		7	58 rue de Varenne	48°51′17″N 2°19′16″E	PA00088724
Hôtel de Montbrun	Hôtel Marchand	4	19 place des Vosges; Rue des Francs-Bourgeois	48°51′22″N 2°21′52″E	PA00086304
Hôtel Montesquiou-Fezensac	Ministère de la Coopération	7	20 rue Monsieur	48°51′00″N 2°18′59″E	PA00088725
Hôtel Montholon		2	23 Boulevard Poissonnière	48°52′17″N 2°20′39″E	PA00086073
Hôtel de Montmor	Hôtel de Montholon	3	79 rue du Temple	48°51′41″N 2°21′22″E	PA00086150
Hôtel de Montmorency-Bours		6	89 rue du Cherche-Midi	48°50′50″N 2°19′21″E	PA00088539
Hôtel de Montmorency-Fosseux		6	4 rue de Tournon	48°51′04″N 2°20′13″E	PA00088538
Hôtel de Montmorin		4	3 place des Vosges	48°51′18″N 2°21′53″E	PA00086307
Hôtel de Montmorin	Ministère des Outre-mer	7	27 rue Oudinot	48°50′58″N 2°18′57″E	PA00088756
Hôtel de Montplanque		1	1 bis place des Victoires	48°51′56″N 2°20′27″E	PA00085831
Hôtel Moreau		9	20 rue de la Chaussée-d'Antin	48°52′20″N 2°20′04″E	PA00088944
Hôtel de Mortagne	Hôtel de Vaucanson	11	51-53 rue de Charonne	48°51′13″N 2°22′42″E	PA00086536
Hôtel de Mortemart		7	27 rue Saint-Guillaume	48°51′15″N 2°19′43″E	
Hôtel Mortier de Sandreville		3	26 rue des Francs-Bourgeois	48°51′28″N 2°21′38″E	PA00086152
Hôtel de la Motte-Montgaubert	Maison des Chantres	4	12 rue Chanoinesse; 2-6 rue des Chantres; 1-3 rue des Ursins	48°51′14″N 2°21′05″E	PA75040001
Hôtel Moufle		1	16 place Vendôme	48°52′02″N 2°19′49″E	PA00085832
Hôtel de Mouy		6	31 rue Dauphine	48°51′18″N 2°20′22″E	PA00088540
Musée Cernuschi		8	8 avenue Vélasquez	48°52′47″N 2°19′15″E	
Musée d'Ennery		16	59 avenue Foch	48°52′18″N 2°16′53″E	PA00086704
Musée de la Contrefaçon		16	16 rue de la Faisanderie	48°52′13″N 2°16′36″E	PA00086678
Musée Gustave-Moreau		9	14 rue de La Rochefoucauld	48°52′41″N 2°20′04″E	PA00088994
Musée Hébert	Hôtel de Montmorency	6	85 rue du Cherche-Midi	48°50′50″N 2°19′22″E	PA00088650
Musée Jacquemart André		8	158 boulevard Haussmann	48°52′32″N 2°18′38″E	PA00088874
Hôtel de Narbonne		7	45 rue de Varenne	48°51′15″N 2°19′21″E	PA00088726
Hôtel de Narbonne-Pelet		7	21 rue de Varenne	48°51′13″N 2°19′30″E	
Hôtel de Nesmond		5	55-57 quai de la Tournelle	48°51′03″N 2°21′05″E	PA00088435
Hôtel de Nevers		2	12 rue Colbert; 58 bis rue de Richelieu	48°52′06″N 2°20′18″E	PA00086031
Hôtel du Nivernais		6	11 rue Garancière	48°51′00″N 2°20′11″E	
Hôtel de Nocé	Ambassade des Philippines	1	26 place Vendôme	48°52′05″N 2°19′49″E	PA00085833
Hôtel de Noirmoutier	Hôtel de Sens	7	138 rue de Grenelle	48°51′28″N 2°19′01″E	PA00088727
Hôtel de Noisy		2	31 Rue de Cléry; 2 rue Poissonnière	48°52′07″N 2°20′52″E	PA00086032
Hôtel d'Olonne		1	19 rue du Louvre	48°51′53″N 2°20′32″E	
Hôtel d'Osmont		2	12 rue Saint-Sauveur; 23 rue Dussoubs	48°51′58″N 2°20′56″E	PA75020002
Hôtel d'Ourscamp	Hôtel de Marsande; Maison de l'Ours	4	44-48 rue François-Miron; 31 rue Geoffroy-l'Asnier	48°51′20″N 2°21′26″E	PA00086308
Hôtel de la Païva		8	25 avenue des Champs-Élysées	48°52′09″N 2°18′27″E	PA00088829
Hôtel de Parabère		1	20 place Vendôme	48°52′03″N 2°19′50″E	PA00085834
Hôtel de Parieu		7	14 rue Las Cases; 19 rue Saint-Dominique	48°51′30″N 2°19′17″E	PA00088769
Hôtel des Parlementaires de la Fronde		4	3 rue des Lions-Saint-Paul	48°51′08″N 2°21′45″E	PA00086309
Hôtel Pauilhac		16	59 avenue Raymond-Poincaré	48°52′03″N 2°17′09″E	PA00086714
Pavillon du roi		4	1 place des Vosges	48°51′18″N 2°21′55″E	PA00086473
Hôtel Pellé de Montaleau	Hôtel de Bosredon	2	8 place des Victoires	48°51′58″N 2°20′28″E	PA00086033
Pension Belhomme		11	161 rue de Charonne	48°51′25″N 2°23′21″E	PA00086544
Hôtel de Percy	Hôtel de Bercy; Hôtel de Pracontal	3	6-10 rue de Thorigny; 14-16 rue du Parc-Royal	48°51′35″N 2°21′46″E	PA00086153
Hôtel de Périgord		7	3 rue Saint-Dominique	48°51′28″N 2°19′24″E	PA00088728
Hôtel Perrinet de Jars	Cercle de l'Union interalliée	8	33 rue du Faubourg-Saint-Honoré	48°52′09″N 2°19′12″E	PA00088843
Petit Luxembourg	Hôtel de la Présidence	6	Rue de Vaugirard	48°50′56″N 2°20′08″E	
Hôtel du Petit-Sully		4	7, 7 bis place des Vosges	48°51′19″N 2°21′51″E	PA00086310
Hôtel Pierrard	Hôtel Colbert-de-Villacerf; Hôtel de Creil; Hôtel Voisenon	4	11 place des Vosges; 12 rue de Turenne	48°51′20″N 2°21′51″E	PA00086311
Hôtel Pillet-Will		8	31 rue du Faubourg-Saint-Honoré	48°52′09″N 2°19′13″E	PA00088827
Plaza Athénée		8	23-27 avenue Montaigne	48°51′59″N 2°18′15″E	PA00132983
Hôtel du Plessis-Bellière		8	6 place de la Concorde	48°52′02″N 2°19′18″E	PA00088830
Hôtel Plessis-Chatillon		7	23 rue de Varenne	48°51′13″N 2°19′30″E	
Hôtel de Pologne		3	65 rue de Turenne	48°51′33″N 2°21′52″E	PA00086154
Hôtel de Pomereu		7	67 rue de Lille	48°51′34″N 2°19′33″E	PA00088729
Hôtel de Pontalba		8	41 rue du Faubourg-Saint-Honoré	48°52′09″N 2°19′10″E	
Hôtel Portalis		1	43 rue Croix-des-Petits-Champs	48°51′55″N 2°20′26″E	PA00085858
Hôtel Potard		4	30 quai de Béthune	48°51′04″N 2°21′24″E	
Hôtel Potocki	Chambre de commerce et d'industrie de Paris	8	27 avenue de Friedland	48°52′27″N 2°18′05″E	PA00088831
Hôtel Pottier de Blancmesnil		4	9 rue Saint-Merri	48°51′33″N 2°21′11″E	PA00086312
Hôtel Poufour du Petit		5	7 rue Lacépède	48°50′37″N 2°21′13″E	PA00088453
Hôtel de Poulpry	Maison des polytechniciens	7	12 rue de Poitiers	48°51′32″N 2°19′32″E	
Hôtel de Pourtalès		8	7 rue Tronchet	48°52′17″N 2°19′31″E	PA00088832
Hôtel de Praslin		7	48 rue de Bourgogne	48°51′25″N 2°19′02″E	PA00088752
Hôtel du Président Hénault	Hôtel de Cantorbe	4	82 rue François-Miron	48°51′19″N 2°21′33″E	PA00086313
Hôtel du Président Rolland		5	37 quai de la Tournelle	48°51′01″N 2°21′10″E	
Hôtel de Prévenchères	Hôtel Lenoir	2	6 place des Victoires	48°51′57″N 2°20′27″E	PA00086034
Hôtel de la Princesse Mathilde		8	10 rue de Courcelles	48°52′25″N 2°18′40″E	PA00088839
Hôtel de Raguse		10	51 rue de Paradis	48°52′32″N 2°20′57″E	PA00086507
Hôtel Raoul de la Faye		4	5 rue Sainte-Croix-de-la-Bretonnerie	48°51′28″N 2°21′26″E	PA00086324
Hôtel de Ravannes		7	41-43 rue Saint-Dominique	48°51′35″N 2°19′03″E	PA00088730
Hôtel Renan-Scheffer	Musée de la vie romantique	9	16 rue Chaptal	48°52′51″N 2°20′00″E	PA00088936
Hôtel de Retz		3	9 rue Charlot	48°51′41″N 2°21′38″E	
Hôtel de Ribault	Hôtel de Langres	4	14 place des Vosges	48°51′19″N 2°22′01″E	PA00086314
Hôtel du 101 rue de Richelieu		2	101 rue de Richelieu	48°52′18″N 2°20′23″E	PA00086041
Hôtel de Richepanse		7	3, 5 rue Masseran	48°50′55″N 2°18′53″E	PA00088731
Hôtel Rivié		2	30-32 rue du Sentier	48°52′13″N 2°20′47″E	PA75020010
Hôtel de Rochambeau	Hôtel d'Asfeld	6	40 rue du Cherche-Midi	48°50′59″N 2°19′35″E	PA00088523
Hôtel de Rochechouart		7	110 rue de Grenelle	48°51′25″N 2°19′16″E	
Hôtel de la Rochefoucauld-Doudeauville	Hôtel de Boisgelin; Hôtel de Janvry; Ambassade d'Italie	7	47 rue de Varenne	48°51′15″N 2°19′20″E	PA00088718
Hôtel de Rohan		3	87 rue Vieille-du-Temple	48°51′35″N 2°21′35″E	PA00086155
Hôtel de Rohan-Chabot	Hôtel de Tessé-Vendome	7	61 rue de Varenne	48°51′17″N 2°19′11″E	PA00088732
Hôtel de Rohan-Guémené	Hôtel Arnaud	4	6 place des Vosges	48°51′17″N 2°21′58″E	PA00086272
Hôtel de Rohan-Montbazon		8	29 rue du Faubourg-Saint-Honoré	48°52′08″N 2°19′14″E	PA00088833
Hôtel Roland Bonaparte	Shangri-La Hotel Paris	16	10 avenue d'Iéna; 10 rue Fresnel	48°51′49″N 2°17′35″E	PA75160005
Hôtel de Roquelaure	Ministère des Travaux publics	7	246 boulevard Saint-Germain	48°51′26″N 2°19′29″E	PA00088733
Hôtel de Rosambo		10	62-64 rue René-Boulanger	48°52′09″N 2°21′32″E	PA00086499
Hôtel Rothelin-Charolais	Ministère de l'Industrie	7	101 rue de Grenelle	48°51′24″N 2°19′11″E	PA00088734
Hôtel de Rothembourg		6	5 rue du Regard; 68 boulevard Raspail	48°50′56″N 2°19′36″E	PA00088541
Hôtel Roualle de Boisgelin		4	29 quai de Bourbon	48°51′11″N 2°21′16″E	PA00086321
Hôtel Rousseau		9	66 rue de La Rochefoucauld	48°52′51″N 2°20′09″E	PA00088918
Hôtel de Sagonne		4	28 rue des Tournelles; 23 boulevard Beaumarchais	48°51′19″N 2°22′04″E	PA00086302
Hôtel de Saint-Aignan	Hôtel d'Avaux; Hôtel de Rochechouart; Hôtel d'Asnières	3	71-75 rue du Temple	48°51′40″N 2°21′20″E	PA00086156
Hôtel de Saint-Chaumont		2	226 rue Saint-Denis; 121 boulevard de Sébastopol	48°52′06″N 2°21′07″E	PA00086037
Hôtel de Saint-Cyr		6	19 rue des Grands-Augustins	48°51′15″N 2°20′26″E	PA75060003
Hôtel du 8 rue Saint-Fiacre		2	33 rue du Sentier; 8 rue Saint-Fiacre	48°52′11″N 2°20′46″E	PA00086042
Hôtel de Saint-Florentin	Hôtel de Talleyrand; Consulat des Etats-Unis	1	2 rue Saint-Florentin	48°52′00″N 2°19′26″E	PA00085836
Hôtel du 14 rue Saint-Guillaume		7	14 rue Saint-Guillaume	48°51′20″N 2°19′47″E	PA00088757
Hôtel Saint-Haure	Hôtel des Dames de Sainte-Aure	5	27 rue Lhomond	48°50′35″N 2°20′49″E	PA00088436
Hôtel Saint-James et d'Albany		1	211 rue Saint-Honoré; 202 rue de Rivoli	48°51′53″N 2°19′51″E	PA00085837
Hôtel du 7 rue Saint-Louis-en-l'Île		4	7 rue Saint-Louis-en-l'Île; 6 rue de Bretonvilliers	48°51′03″N 2°21′33″E	PA00086323
Hôtel du 11 rue Saint-Louis-en-l'Île		4	11 rue Saint-Louis-en-l'Île	48°51′04″N 2°21′31″E	PA00086325
Hôtel du 13 rue Saint-Louis-en-l'Île		4	13 rue Saint-Louis-en-l'Île	48°51′04″N 2°21′30″E	PA00086326
Hôtel du 29 rue Saint-Louis-en-l'Île		4	29 rue Saint-Louis-en-l'Île	48°51′06″N 2°21′24″E	PA00086327
Hôtel du 79 boulevard Saint-Michel		5	79 boulevard Saint-Michel; 8 impasse Royer-Collard	48°50′45″N 2°20′26″E	PA00088438
Hôtel de Saint-Simon	Hôtel de Mecklenbourg; Hôtel de Chamilly	6	17 rue du Cherche-Midi	48°51′04″N 2°19′44″E	PA00088565
Hôtel de Sainte-Aldegonde		7	102 rue du Bac	48°51′14″N 2°19′25″E	PA00088735
Hôtel Salé	Hôtel Aubert de Fontenay; Musée national Picasso	3	5 rue de Thorigny	48°51′35″N 2°21′44″E	PA00086157
Hôtel de la Salle	Hôtel Castelnau; Hôtel de Rotrou	4	5 place des Vosges	48°51′18″N 2°21′52″E	PA00086315
Hôtel de Salm	Palais de la Légion d'Honneur	7	64 rue de Lille; 1 rue de Solférino; 2 rue de Bellechasse; Quai Anatole-France	48°51′38″N 2°19′28″E	PA00088793
Hôtel de Salm-Dyck	Hôtel de Ségur	7	97 rue du Bac	48°51′12″N 2°19′25″E	PA00088736
Hôtel Salomon de Rothschild	Hôtel de Beaujon; Fondation nationale des arts graphiques et plastiques	8	12 avenue de Friedland; 9, 11 rue Berryer; 193 rue du Faubourg-Saint-Honoré	48°52′31″N 2°18′11″E	PA00088834
Hôtel de Samuel Bernard		7	46 rue du Bac	48°51′24″N 2°19′35″E	PA00088737
Hôtel Sapere Aude		6	8 rue Hautefeuille	48°51′07″N 2°20′32″E	
Hôtel de Sauroy		3	58 rue Charlot; 9 rue de Normandie	48°51′48″N 2°21′49″E	PA00086233
Hôtel de Saxe		6	3 quai Malaquais	48°51′29″N 2°20′11″E	PA00088542
Hôtel Schneider		8	137 rue du Faubourg-Saint-Honoré	48°52′26″N 2°18′29″E	PA00088835
Hôtel Scipion		5	13 rue Scipion	48°50′19″N 2°21′12″E	PA00088437
Hôtel de Sechtré		10	66 rue René-Boulanger	48°52′09″N 2°21′31″E	PA00086500
Hôtel Sédille		8	28 boulevard Malesherbes	48°52′24″N 2°19′17″E	PA00088897
Hôtel Séguier		6	16 rue Séguier	48°51′14″N 2°20′30″E	PA75060009
Hôtel de Ségur		1	22 place Vendôme	48°52′04″N 2°19′50″E	PA00085838
Hôtel de Seignelay	Ministère du Commerce et de l'Industrie	7	80 rue de Lille	48°51′40″N 2°19′19″E	PA00088738
Hôtel de Sénecterre	Hôtel de la Ferté Saint-Nectaire	7	24 rue de l'Université; 17-19 rue de Verneuil	48°51′19″N 2°20′07″E	PA00088739
Hôtel de Sens		4	1 rue du Figuier	48°51′13″N 2°21′32″E	PA00086316
Hôtel du 90 rue de Sèvres		7	90 rue de Sèvres	48°50′47″N 2°18′54″E	PA00088759
Hôtel Sillery-Genlis		6	13 quai de Conti; 2 impasse de Conti	48°51′27″N 2°20′17″E	PA00088543
Hôtel de Simiane		1	11 place Vendôme	48°52′04″N 2°19′43″E	
Hôtel de Sommery		7	115 rue de Grenelle	48°51′27″N 2°19′04″E	PA00088740
Hôtel de Soubise	Hôtel de Clisson; Hôtel de Guise	3	60 rue des Francs-Bourgeois	48°51′38″N 2°21′30″E	PA00086155
Hôtel de Sourdéac		6	8 rue Garancière	48°51′00″N 2°20′09″E	PA00088584
Petit Hôtel de Sourdéac		6	12 rue de Condé	48°51′04″N 2°20′17″E	PA00088544
Hôtel de Soyecourt		1	3 place des Victoires	48°51′55″N 2°20′28″E	PA00085840
Hôtel de Stahrenberg		7	77 rue de Lille	48°51′35″N 2°19′29″E	PA75070004
Hôtel de Sully	Centre des monuments nationaux	4	7, 7 bis place des Vosges; 62 rue Saint-Antoine	48°51′16″N 2°21′50″E	PA00086310
Hôtel Talhouet		8	1 avenue de Marigny	48°52′10″N 2°18′53″E	PA00088851
Hôtel de Tallard	Hôtel Amelot de Chaillou	3	78 rue des Archives; 12 rue Pastourelle	48°51′46″N 2°21′36″E	PA00086118
Hôtel Talma		9	9 rue de la Tour-des-Dames	48°52′40″N 2°19′59″E	PA00088919
Hôtel Tannevot		1	26 rue Cambon	48°52′05″N 2°19′37″E	PA00085843
Hôtel de Tavannes		7	5 rue Saint-Dominique	48°51′29″N 2°19′23″E	PA00088742
Hôtel du 101-103 rue du Temple		3	101-103 rue du Temple	48°51′44″N 2°21′26″E	PA00086165
Hôtel de Tessé		7	1 quai Voltaire; 2 rue des Saints-Pères	48°51′29″N 2°19′58″E	PA00088743
Hôtel Thibert des Martrais		1	6 place Vendôme	48°52′00″N 2°19′45″E	PA00085830
Hôtel Thirioux d'Arconville		3	22 rue des Quatre-Fils	48°51′39″N 2°21′32″E	PA00086158
Hôtel Thiroux de Lailly	Hôtel de Montmorency	3	5 rue de Montmorency	48°51′45″N 2°21′24″E	PA00086151
Hôtel Thuriot de la Rosière		4	10 rue des Lions-Saint-Paul	48°51′09″N 2°21′44″E	PA00086317
Hôtel du Tillet de la Bussière		6	52 rue Saint-André-des-Arts	48°51′13″N 2°20′25″E	PA00088624
Hôtel Titon		10	58 rue du Faubourg-Poissonnière	48°52′30″N 2°20′54″E	PA00086505
Hôtel de Toulouse		1	39 rue Croix-des-Petits-Champs	48°51′53″N 2°20′24″E	PA00085841
Hôtel de Transylvanie		6	9 quai Malaquais	48°51′28″N 2°20′06″E	PA00088545
Hôtel de Tresmes	Hôtel de Gourgues	3	26 place des Vosges	48°51′22″N 2°21′59″E	PA00086159
Hôtel Tubeuf	Hôtel de Chevry-Tubeuf	2	8 rue des Petits-Champs	48°52′00″N 2°20′17″E	PA00086009
Hôtel de Turenne	Hôtel de Scarron	6	25 boulevard du Montparnasse	48°50′43″N 2°19′11″E	PA00088546
Hôtel du 6 rue du Val-de-Grâce		5	6 rue du Val-de-Grâce	48°50′28″N 2°20′26″E	PA00088439
Hôtel de Vaudreuil		7	7 rue de la Chaise	48°51′11″N 2°19′38″E	PA00088744
Hôtel du 2 avenue Vélasquez		8	2 avenue Vélasquez	48°52′49″N 2°18′46″E	
Hôtel du 4 avenue Vélasquez		8	4 avenue Vélasquez	48°52′49″N 2°18′46″E	
Hôtel du 5 avenue Vélasquez		8	5 avenue Vélasquez	48°52′47″N 2°18′46″E	
Hôtel du 6 avenue Vélasquez		8	6 avenue Vélasquez	48°52′48″N 2°18′45″E	
Hôtel de Vendôme	École nationale supérieure des mines	6	60-62 boulevard Saint-Michel	48°50′42″N 2°20′19″E	PA00088508
Hôtel Véron	Château d'Auteuil; Hôtel Puscher; Hôtel de Pérignon	16	16-18 rue d'Auteuil	48°50′51″N 2°16′03″E	PA00086676
Hôtel de Verrières	Hôtel Antier	16	45-47 rue d'Auteuil	48°50′51″N 2°15′54″E	
Hôtel des Vertus	Hôtel de Courthenay; Hôtel de Chemilly; Hôtel de Béthune; Hôtel de Croix	7	3 rue de la Chaise	48°51′11″N 2°19′37″E	PA00088754
Hôtel de Vibraye		4	15 rue Vieille-du-Temple; 56 rue du Roi-de-Sicile	48°51′25″N 2°21′24″E	PA00086318
Hôtel de Vic	Hôtel Bouchotte	3	77 rue du Temple	48°51′40″N 2°21′21″E	PA00086160
Hôtel de Vigny		3	10 rue du Parc-Royal	48°51′31″N 2°21′47″E	PA00086161
Hôtel de Vilette	Hôtel de Bragelongue	7	27 quai Voltaire; 1 rue de Beaune	48°51′33″N 2°19′49″E	PA00088745
Hôtel Vilgruy		8	9 rue François-Ier; 16 rue Jean-Goujon	48°51′59″N 2°18′26″E	PA00088837
Petit Hôtel de Villars		7	118 rue de Grenelle	48°51′25″N 2°19′11″E	PA00088746
Hôtel de Villars	Mairie du 7e arrondissement	7	116 rue de Grenelle	48°51′25″N 2°19′13″E	PA00088788
Hôtel de Villemaré	Hôtel de l'État-Major; Hôtel Dangé; Hôtel de Jouber	1	7-9 place Vendôme	48°52′02″N 2°19′41″E	PA00085821
Hôtel de Villeroy	Hôtel de la Poste	1	34 rue des Bourdonnais; 9 rue des Déchargeurs	48°51′36″N 2°20′45″E	PA00085842
Hôtel de Villeroy	Ministère de l'Agriculture	7	78 rue de Varenne	48°51′21″N 2°19′07″E	PA00088747
Hôtel du 29 avenue de Villiers	Maison de l'Europe de Paris	17	29 avenue de Villiers	48°52′55″N 2°18′43″E	
Hôtel de Vitry		3	14, 14 bis rue des Minimes	48°51′26″N 2°21′56″E	PA00086162
Hôtel de Vitry	Hôtel de Guiche; Hôtel de Boufflers; Hôtel de Duras; Hôtel Lefebvre-d'Ormesson	3	24 place des Vosges	48°51′22″N 2°22′00″E	PA00086163
Hôtel de Vogüé	Commissariat général à la stratégie et à la prospective	7	18 rue de Martignac	48°51′30″N 2°19′07″E	
Hôtel du 4 place des Vosges		4	4 place des Vosges	48°51′17″N 2°21′56″E	PA00086465
Hôtel de Vouvray		3	6 rue du Parc-Royal	48°51′31″N 2°21′49″E	PA00086164

=== Former hôtels particuliers ===
Hôtel	Other names	Arrondissement	Address	Coordinates	Mérimée
Hôtel d'Argenson	Chancellerie d'Orléans	1	19 rue des Bons-Enfants	48°51′47″N 2°20′19″E	
Hôtel Bautru Colbert		2	6 rue des Petits-Champs	48°51′59″N 2°20′21″E	
Hôtel de Brionne	Hôtel d'Armagnac	1	Rue de Rohan	48°51′47″N 2°19′59″E	
Hôtel de Brunoy		8	Rue du Faubourg-Saint-Honoré	48°52′09″N 2°19′03″E	
Hôtel de Chevreuse	Hôtel de Luynes	7	33 rue Saint-Dominique	48°51′20″N 2°19′36″E	
Hôtel de Choiseul	Hôtel de Crozat	2	101 rue de Richelieu	48°52′15″N 2°20′19″E	
Hôtel de Condé		6	Rue de Condé	48°51′00″N 2°20′19″E	
Hôtel des Fermes du roi	Hôtel Séguier; Hôtel de Bellegarde	1	Rue du Louvre	48°51′50″N 2°20′31″E	
Hôtel de Guénégaud	Hôtel de Nevers; Grand Hôtel de Conti	6	Quai de Conti	48°51′23″N 2°20′21″E	
Hôtel Hesselin		4	Quai de Béthune	48°51′03″N 2°21′27″E	
Hôtel d'Humières		7	280 boulevard Saint-Germain	48°51′41″N 2°19′15″E	
Hôtel de La Trémoille		1	Rue des Bourdonnais	48°51′34″N 2°20′41″E	
Hôtel de Longueville	Hôtel de Chevreuse; Hôtel d'Épernon	1	Rue Saint-Thomas-du-Louvre	48°51′41″N 2°20′05″E	
Hôtel de mademoiselle Guimard	Hôtel Guimard	9	9 rue de la Chaussée-d'Antin	48°52′18″N 2°20′01″E	
Hôtel du Maréchal d'Estrées		3	8 rue Barbette	48°51′32″N 2°21′41″E	
Hôtel Mascarani	Hôtel des Vivres	3	83rue Charlot	48°51′54″N 2°21′52″E	
Hôtel de Montmorency		9	2 boulevard des Capucines	48°52′16″N 2°20′01″E	
Hôtel de Montmorency-Luxembourg	Hôtel de Rivié; Hôtel de Maillebois	2	10 rue Saint-Marc	48°52′15″N 2°20′30″E	
Hôtel Murat	Hôtel du prince Murat	8	28 rue de Monceau	48°52′36″N 2°18′32″E	
Hôtel de Noailles		1	211 rue Saint-Honoré	48°51′55″N 2°19′52″E	
Pavillon de Hanovre		2	Boulevard des Italiens	48°52′15″N 2°20′04″E	
Hôtel du Plessis-Guénégaud	Hôtel de Brienne; Hôtel de Conti; Hôtel de Créquy; Hôtel de Lauzun; Hôtel de La Roche-sur-Yon; Hôtel de Mazarin	6	13 Quais Malaquais	48.8577°N 2.3347°E	
Hôtel du Petit-Bourbon		1	Place du Louvre	48°51′34″N 2°20′23″E	
Hôtel des Prévôts	Hôtel de Brienne; Hôtel de Jassaud	4	16 rue Charlemagne	48°51′16″N 2°21′36″E	
Hôtel Raoul		4	6 rue Beautreillis	48°51′09″N 2°21′48″E	
Hôtel de Ratabon		1	10 rue de Richelieu	48°51′51″N 2°20′10″E	
Hôtel de la reine Hortense	Palais de la reine Hortense	9	17 rue Laffitte	48°52′24″N 2°20′13″E	
Palais Rose de l'avenue Foch		16	40 avenue Foch	48°52′26″N 2°17′05″E	
Hôtel de Royaumont		1	4-6 rue du Jour	48°51′49″N 2°20′41″E	
Hôtel de Soissons	Hôtel de la Reine	1	Rue du Louvre	48°51′47″N 2°20′35″E	
Hôtel Thellusson	Hôtel Thélusson	9	Rue de Provence	48°52′29″N 2°20′18″E	
Hôtel des Tournelles		4	Place des Vosges	48°51′16″N 2°21′54″E	
Hôtel d'Uzès		2	172 rue Montmartre	48°52′15″N 2°20′34″E	
Hôtel de Valentinois		16	Rue Raynouard	48°51′17″N 2°16′44″E	

== See also ==
- List of monuments historiques in Paris
