= Hôtel du Tillet de la Bussière =

Coordinates: 48.8535°N 2.3403°E

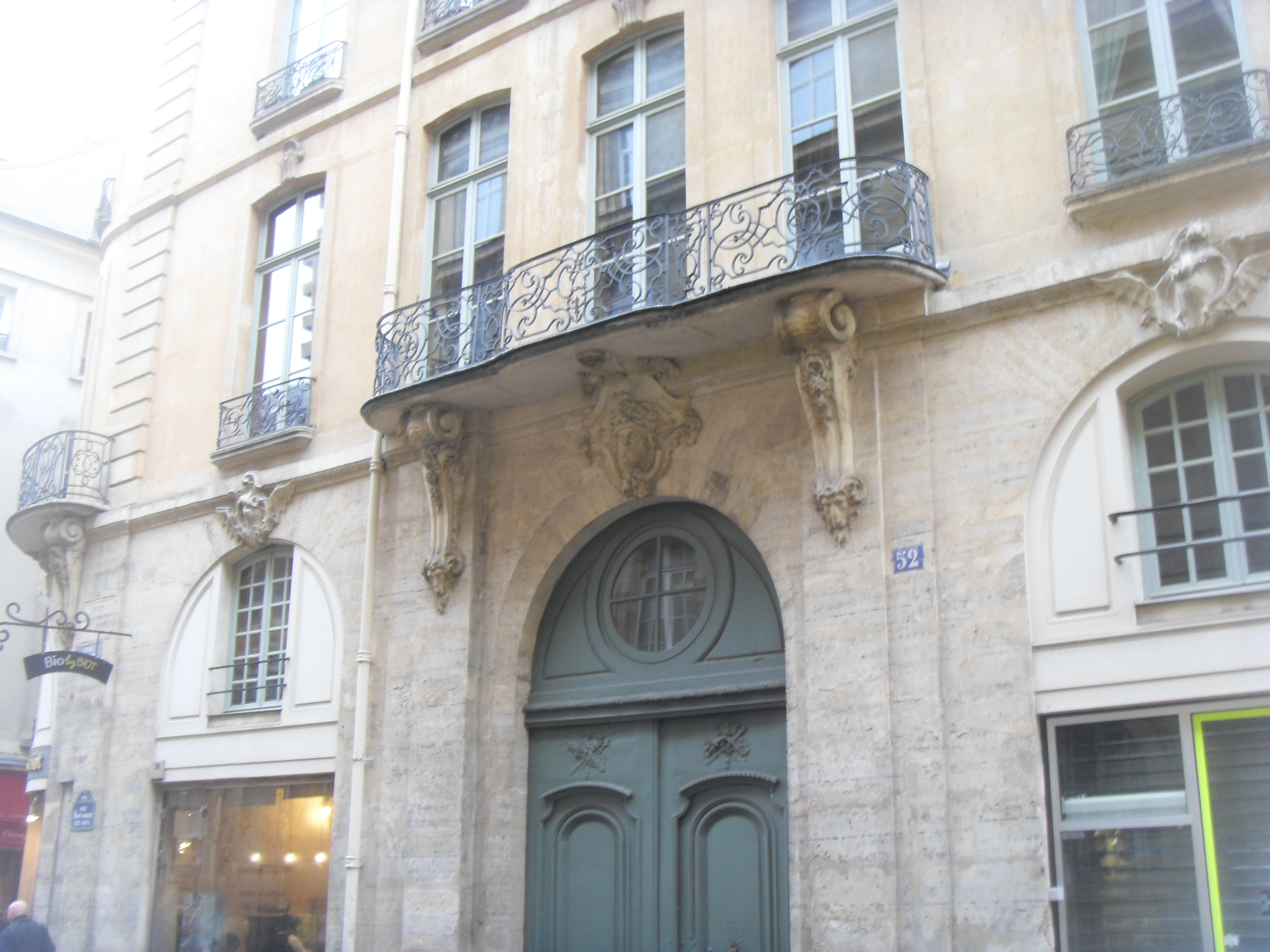
- Interactive map of the Hôtel du Tillet de la Bussière area

General information
- Type: Hôtel particulier
- Location: 52 rue Saint-André-des-Arts, Paris, France
- Completed: 18th century

Hôtel du Tillet de la Bussière is a historic hôtel particulier in the 6th arrondissement. It was built in the 18th century. It has been listed as an official historical monument since March 29, 1928.
