= Rue Vaneau =

Street in Paris, France

Coordinates: 48°51′03″N 2°19′10″E

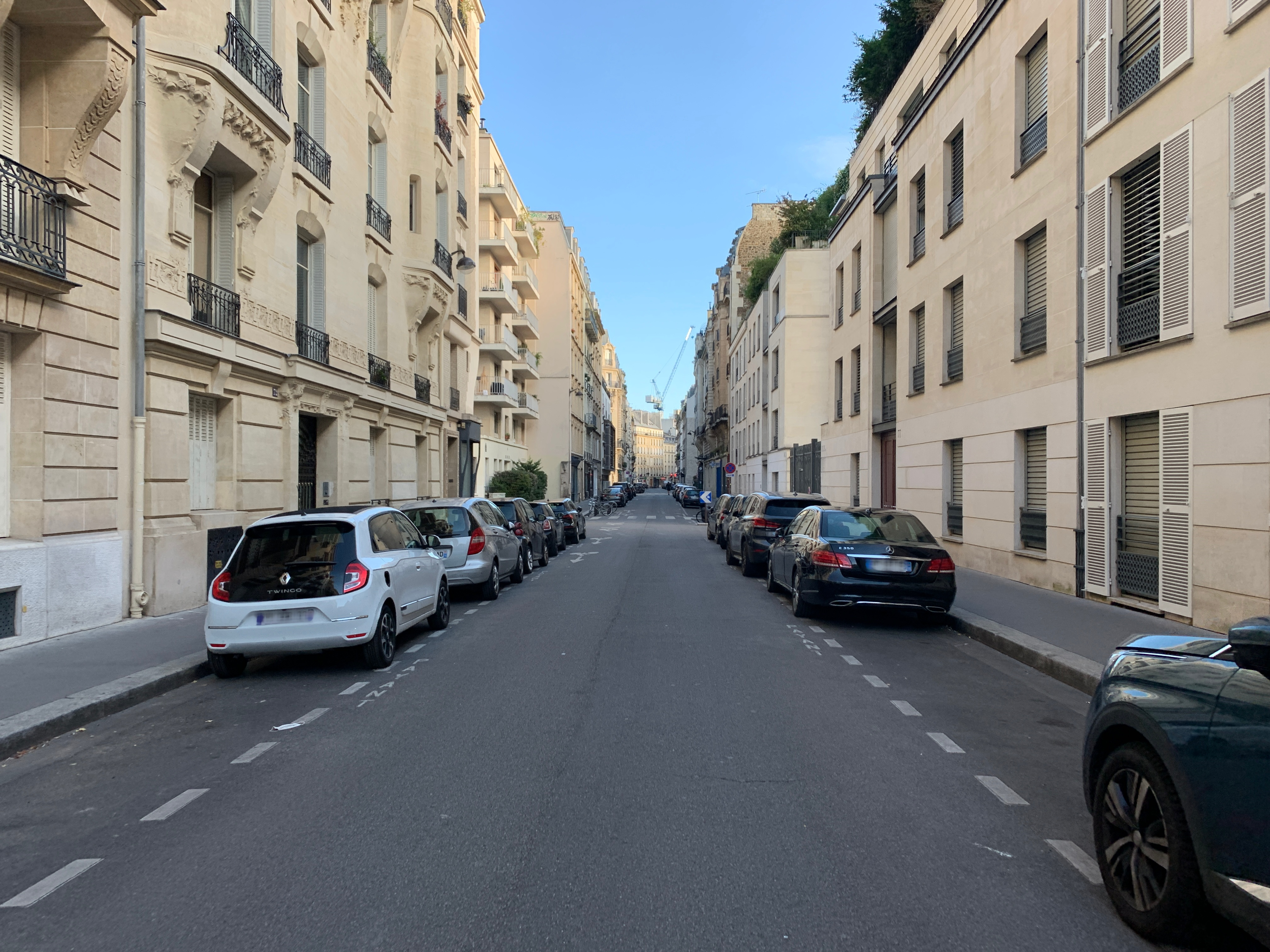
Rue Vaneau in 2021

The Rue Vaneau is a street in the 7th arrondissement of Paris, France. It is named after Louis Vaneau (1811–1830), a student of the École Polytechnique, who was killed while charging the Caserne de Babylone (barracks) during the July Revolution.

It is close to the personal residence of the Prime Minister of France on the Rue de Varenne.

Karl Marx lived in this street when he was in Paris between 1843 and 1845. It is now populated by hotels, apartments, and high end department stores.
