= Rue Elzévir =

Street in Paris, France

Coordinates: 48.8584°N 2.3616°E

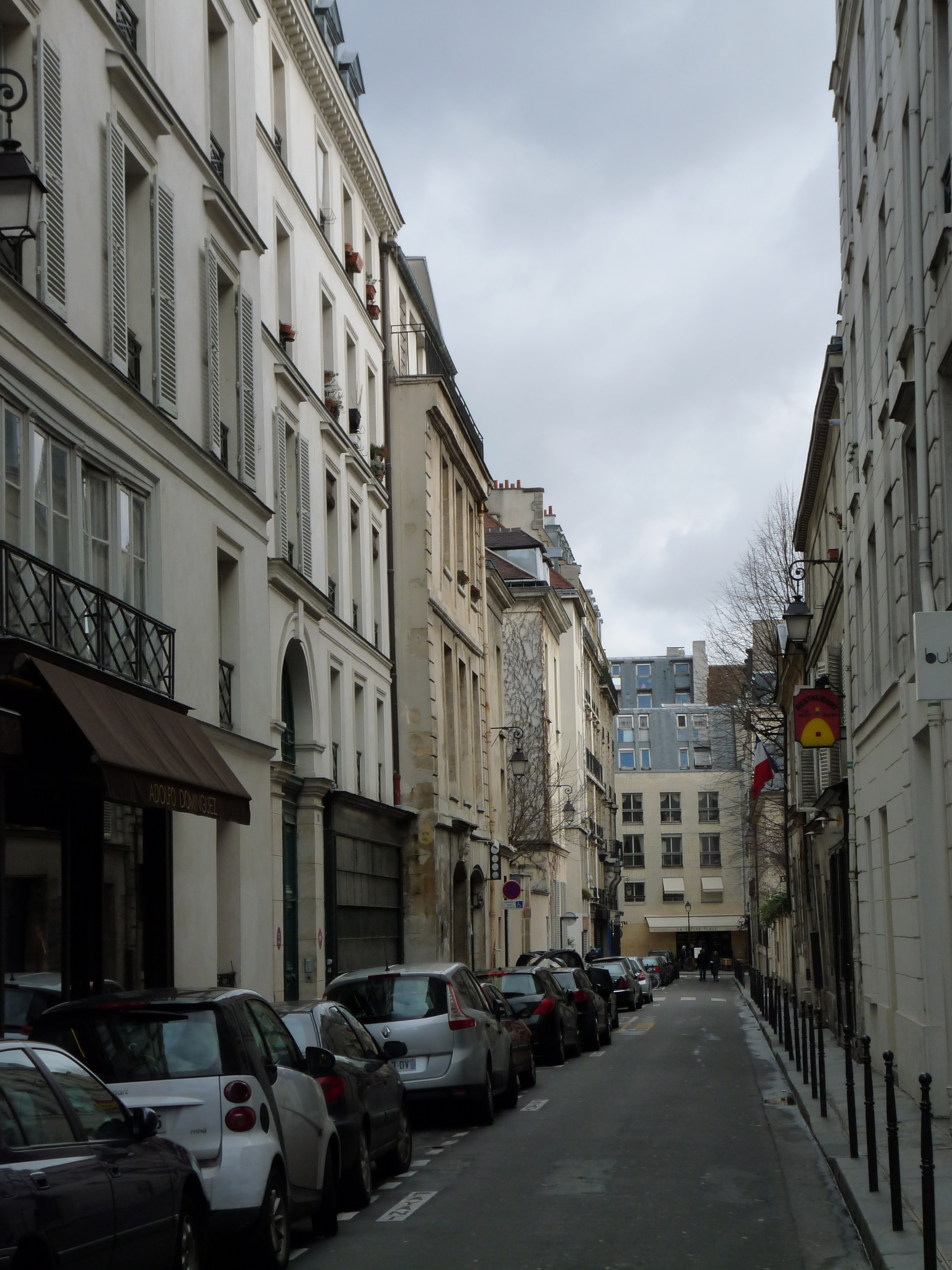
Rue Elzévir

The Rue Elzévir (French pronunciation: [ʁy ɛlzeviʁ]) is a street in the part of Le Marais in the 3rd arrondissement, Paris, France.

From 1990, the Musée Cognacq-Jay has been at 8 rue Elzévir.
