= Rue Oudinot =

Street in Paris, France

Coordinates: 48.8501°N 2.3175°E

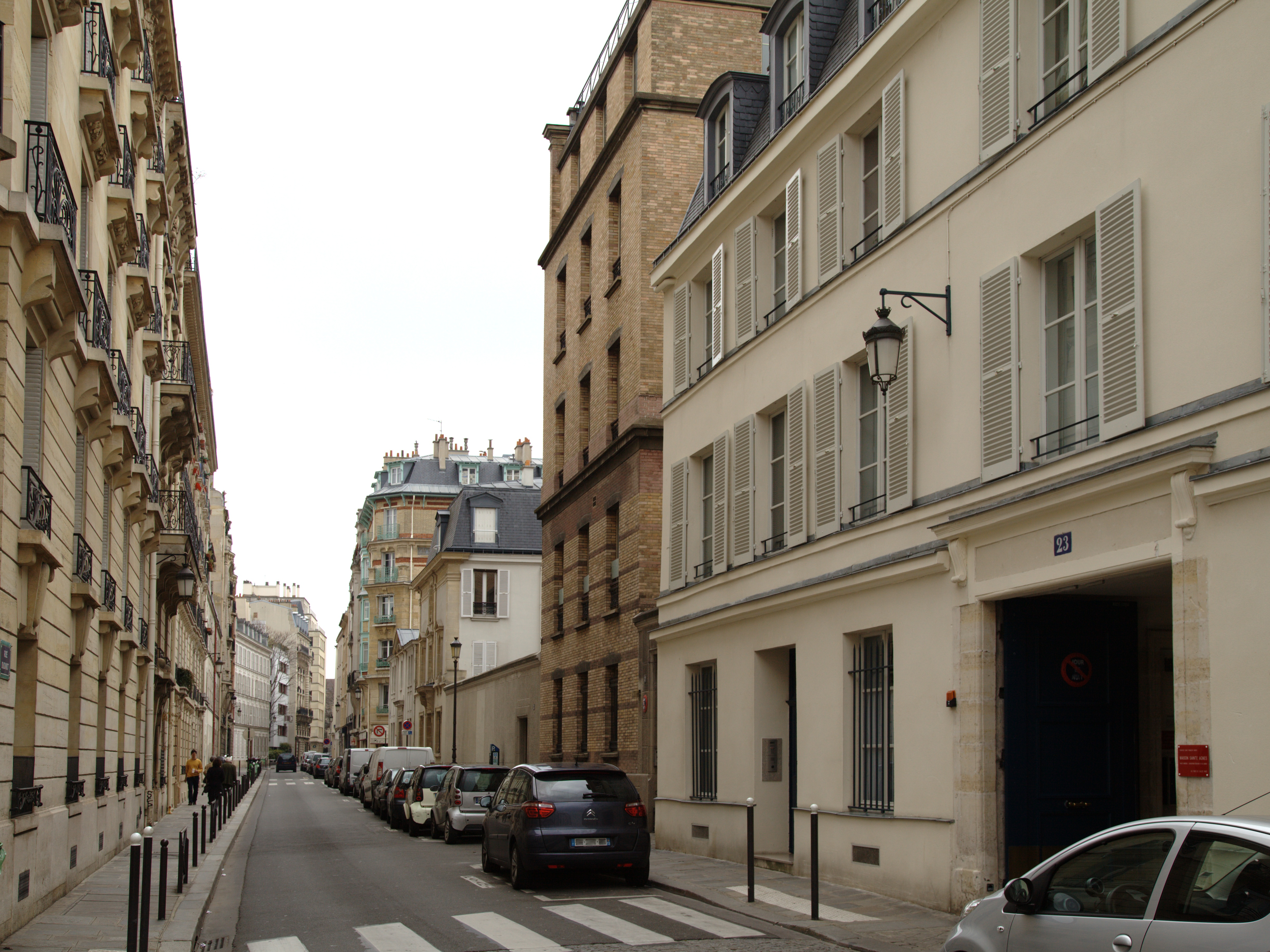
A view of the Rue Oudinot

The Rue Oudinot (English: Oudinot Street) is a street in the 7th arrondissement of Paris, France. It was named for Marshal Nicolas-Charles Oudinot (1767–1847). The now-defunct Ministry of the Colonies was located on the street, where the current-day Ministry of the Overseas can be found.
