= Rue de l'Université, Lyon =

Street in Lyon, France

Coordinates: 45°44′56″N 4°50′33″E

Rue de l'Université
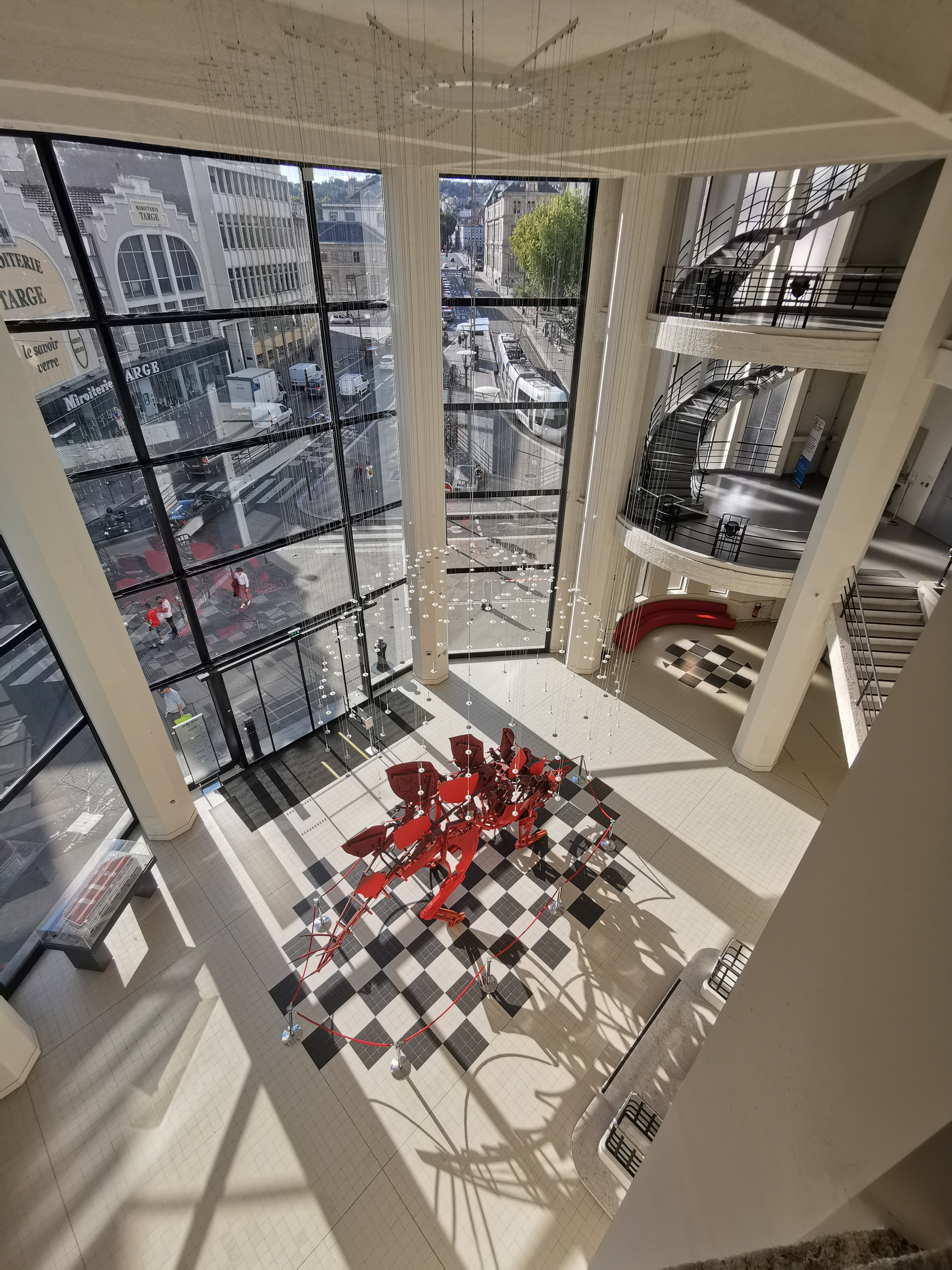
- The street as seen from the Citroën garage
- Type: Street
- Location: 7th arrondissement of Lyon, France
- Postal code: 69007

The Rue de l'Université (French pronunciation: [ʁy d(ə) lynivɛʁsite]) is a large street in the 7th arrondissement of Lyon which connects the Pont de l'Université and Avenue Jean-Jaurès. It is extended to the east by Rue Marc Bloch then the Route de Vienne. It was named after the presence of several university buildings, built at the end of the 19th century starting in 1884.

== History ==
The street may have already existed in Roman times connecting the Gallo-Roman cities of Lugdunum (today's Lyon) and Vienna (today's Vienne, Isère). (Note: Not to be confused with today's Vienna, then known as Vindobona) It ended at the Rhône where there may have been a bridge. Once the river crossed, the street ended in the district of Canabae, the current peninsula, below the city of Lugdunum, on the right bank of the Saône. This is attested by cippi mausoleums or burial found in this area due to the presence of a Roman necropolis located around the access road to the city. A hypothetical layout can be found noting that three discoveries are aligned under the street, respectively, in the Rue de Marseille, Rue Sébastien Gryphe and Place de la Madeleine. Thus, in 1870, Acceptius' tomb was found under the Citroën garage and in July 1943, four blocks including ancient basis of a cippus and its pyramidion were found at number 33, rue de l'Université.

The street was no longer used when the Roman Empire fell. In 1180, the tower of Béchevelin was built by John 1st of Bellesme (or Jean Fair Hands), Archbishop of Lyon. It is located near the Place Depéret and the Pont de l'Université, which led several authors to imagine that the first bridge over the Rhône, which appeared in several texts would be located, not that of the Rue de la Guillotière, but that of the Rue de l'Université. The base of the tower is visible on a 1550 scenographic plan and would have been only partly destroyed when Protestant troops left the place in 1561. The ruins of the tower were visible up to half of the 19th century.

The street was formerly named Rue Bouchardy, as André Bouchardy lived in the Cour du Soleil and the drawing of the street crossed over his house. It received its current name after the deliberation of the municipal council on 17 June 1902. The eastern part of the street, from the Rue Jean-Jaurès, became the Rue Marc-Bloch in 1945.

It took its first form in the late 19th century with the construction of university buildings to the south, then that of the north in the early 20th century. The eastern part was open in the early 20th century by the demolition and a broadening.

== Architecture ==
The street starts with a wide part between the two gray stone big facades of the universities, then widens again after the Rue Pasteur with workshops and a two-floor large square building. After the Rue Gryphe and the Place Prado, it becomes a common avenue with two rows of buildings, high at north, more diverse and lower at south. The Citroën garage was built in 1930.
