= Quai de la Tournelle =

Paris riverwalk

Quai de la Tournelle street sign

Quai de la Tournelle is a street and riverwalk along the south bank of the Seine in Paris. Tournelle means turret or small tower. It is a starting point of Pont de la Tournelle bridge, the most recently built version of which was constructed in 1928, which crosses over Île Saint-Louis. It was the site of an important 17th-century gate. Landmarks include La Tour d'Argent, which claims to be the oldest continuously operating restaurant in the city.
