= List of monuments historiques in Paris =

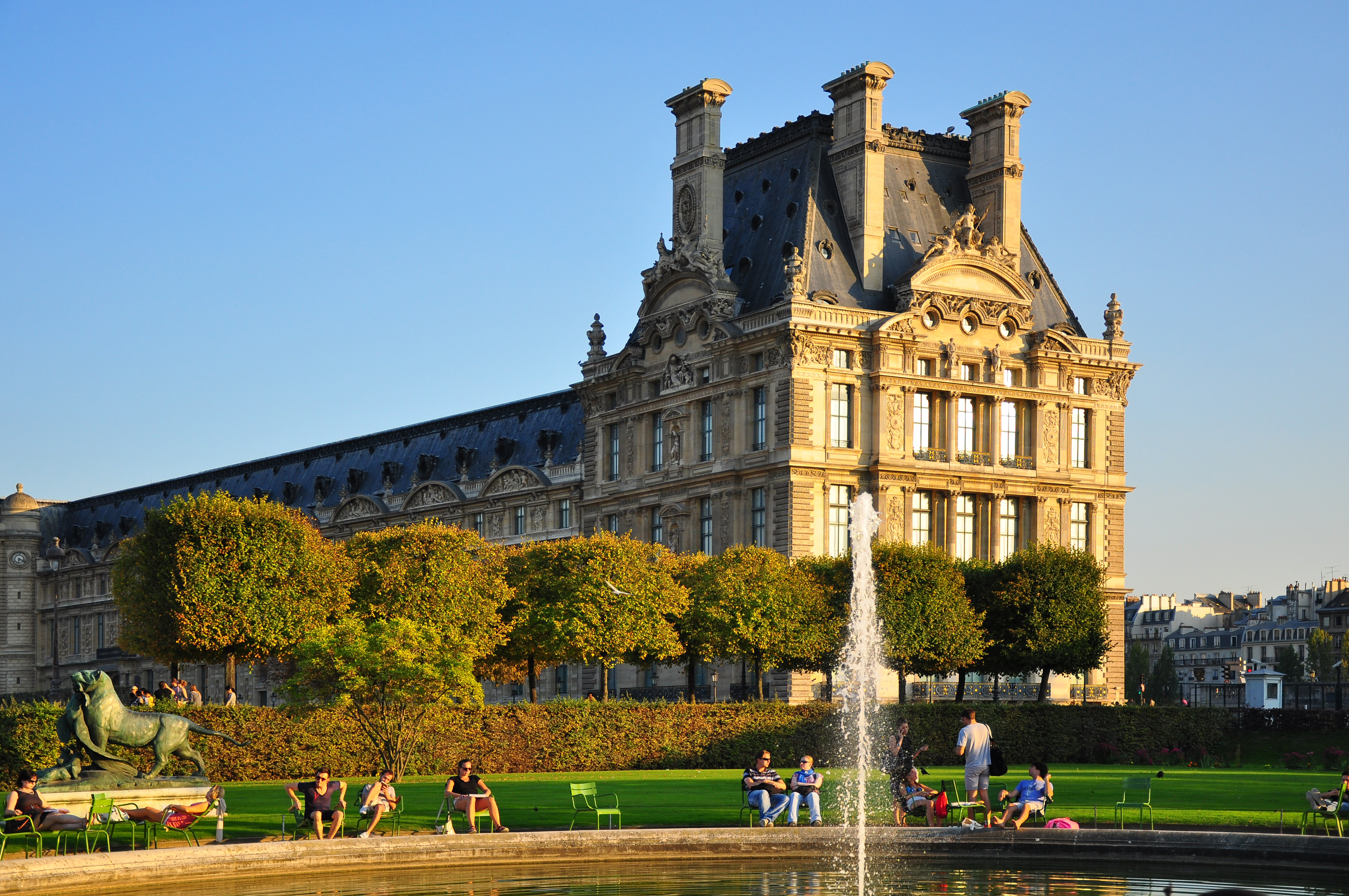
The Louvre Palace, a monument historique in Paris

The term monument historique is a designation given to some national heritage sites in France. It may also refer to the state procedure in France by which National Heritage protection is extended to a building, a specific part of a building, a collection of buildings, garden, bridge, or other structure, because of their importance to France's architectural and historical cultural heritage. Both public and privately owned structures may be listed in this way, as well as also movable objects.

Buildings classified as monuments historiques include well known Parisian structures such as the Eiffel Tower, the Louvre, and the Palais Garnier opera house, plus abbeys, churches such as Saint-Germain-des-Prés, cathedrals such as Notre-Dame de Paris and hotels such as the Hôtel de Crillon. As of 2011 there were 1,816 monuments listed, 434 classés and 1,382 inscrits, in Paris.

Monuments historiques in Paris

Arrondissement	Monuments
1	245
2	113
3	141
4	252
5	107
6	188
7	139
8	110
9	124
10	55
11	44
12	35
13	23
14	51
15	26
16	65
17	22
18	29
19	24
20	17

Paris arrondissements

== Monuments historiques ==
Abbreviations: Arr. = arrondissement; Ref. = reference.

Monument	Arr.	Address	Ref.
Former apartment of Coco Chanel	1	31 rue Cambon	
Au chien qui fume	1	33 rue du Pont-Neuf	
Bourse de commerce	1	2 rue de Viarmes	
Boutique	1	14 rue de la Sourdière	
Café-Bar	1	3 rue Étienne-Marcel	
Café-Bar	1	91 rue Saint-Denis; 79 rue Rambuteau	
Le Cochon à l'Oreille	1	15 rue Montmartre	
Cercle républicain	1	5 avenue de l'Opéra	
Colonne Médicis	1	2 rue de Viarmes	
Colonne Vendôme	1	Place Vendôme	
Cour des Comptes	1	13 rue Cambon	
Couvent des Feuillants	1	229-235 rue Saint-Honoré	
Crémerie	1	25 rue Danielle-Casanova	
Édicule Guimard of the Châtelet station	1	Rue de Rivoli; Rue des Lavandières-Sainte-Opportune	
Édicule Guimard of the Étienne-Marcel station	1	14 rue de Turbigo	
Édicule Guimard of the Louvre-Rivoli station	1	Rue de l'Amiral-de-Coligny; Rue de Rivoli	
Édicule Guimard of the Palais-Royal station	1	Place du Palais-Royal; Rue de Rivoli	
Édicule Guimard of the Tuileries station	1	Rue de Rivoli	
Église Notre-Dame-de-l'Assomption	1	263 rue Saint-Honoré	
Église Saint-Eustache	1	2 rue du Jour	
Église Saint-Germain-l'Auxerrois	1	19 rue des Prêtres-Saint-Germain-l'Auxerrois	
Église Saint-Leu-Saint-Gilles	1	92 rue Saint-Denis	
Église Saint-Roch	1	18 rue Saint-Roch	
Enceinte of Philippe-Auguste	1	7, 9 rue du Jour; 62 rue Jean-Jacques-Rousseau	
Enceinte of Philippe-Auguste	1	21, 23 rue du Jour; 70 rue Jean-Jacques-Rousseau	
Enceinte of Philippe-Auguste	1	11, 13 rue du Louvre; 20 rue Jean-Jacques-Rousseau	
Enceinte of Philippe-Auguste	1	146, 148, 150 rue Saint-Honoré	
Convenience store	1	9 rue Pierre-Lescot	
Convenience store	1	95 rue Saint-Honoré	
Fontaine de la Croix du Trahoir	1	Rue de l'Arbre-Sec; Rue Saint-Honoré	
Fontaine des Innocents	1	2 rue des Innocents	
Fontaine du Palmier	1	Place du Châtelet	
Galerie Véro-Dodat	1	2 rue du Bouloi; 19 rue Jean-Jacques-Rousseau	
Hôtel Batailhe de Francès	1	1 place Vendôme	
Hôtel Baudard de Saint-James	1	12 place Vendôme	
Hôtel Bauyn de Péreuse	1	5 place des Victoires	
Hôtel Bergeret de Grancourt	1	2 place des Victoires	
Hôtel Bergeret de Talmont	1	4 place des Victoires	
Hôtel de Boffrand	1	24 place Vendôme	
Hôtel de Boullongne	1	23 place Vendôme	
Hôtel de Bourvallais	1	11, 13 place Vendôme; 30, 34, 36 rue Cambon	
Hôtel Bristol	1	3, 5 place Vendôme; 360 rue Saint-Honoré; Rue de Castiglione	
Hôtel Bullion	1	9 rue Coq-Héron	
Hôtel Charlemagne	1	1 place des Victoires	
Hôtel de Crozat	1	17 place Vendôme	
Hôtel Delpech de Chaunot	1	8 place Vendôme	
Hôtel Dodun	1	21 rue de Richelieu; 10 rue Molière	
Hôtel Duché des Tournelles	1	18 place Vendôme	
Hôtel Dupin	1	68 rue Jean-Jacques-Rousseau	
Hôtel de l'État-Major de la Place et du Gouvernement militaire	1	7, 9 place Vendôme	
Hôtel d'Évreux	1	19 place Vendôme	
Hôtel de La Fare	1	14 place Vendôme	
Hôtel de Fontpertuis	1	21 place Vendôme	
Hôtel de France et de Choiseul	1	239, 241 rue Saint-Honoré	
Hôtel Gaillard de la Bouëxière	1	28 place Vendôme; 37 rue Danielle-Casanova	
Hôtel de Gargan	1	37 rue Saint-Roch	
Hôtel de Gramont	1	15 place Vendôme	
Hôtel Heuzé de Vologer	1	4 place Vendôme	
Hôtel de Latour-Maubourg	1	10 place Vendôme	
Hôtel Lulli	1	45 rue des Petits-Champs; 47 rue Sainte-Anne	
Hôtel Marquet de Bourgade	1	2 place Vendôme	
Hôtel de Montplanque	1	1 bis place des Victoires	
Hôtel Moufle	1	16 place Vendôme	
Hôtel de Nocé	1	26 place Vendôme	
Hôtel de Parabère	1	20 place Vendôme	
Hôtel de La Porte	1	25 rue du Jour; 15 rue Montmartre	
Hôtel de Saint-Florentin	1	2 rue Saint-Florentin	
Hôtel Saint-James et d'Albany	1	211 rue Saint-Honoré; 202 rue de Rivoli	
Hôtel de Ségur	1	22 place Vendôme	
Hôtel de Soyecourt	1	3 place des Victoires	
Hôtel Tannevot	1	26 rue Cambon	
Hôtel Thibert des Martrais	1	6 place Vendôme	
Hôtel de Toulouse	1	39 rue Croix-des-Petits-Champs	
Hôtel de Villeroy	1	34 rue des Bourdonnais; 9 rue des Déchargeurs	
Building	1	35, 37 rue de l'Arbre-Sec; 1 rue Bailleul	
Building	1	52 rue de l'Arbre-Sec	
Building	1	1-5 rue de Beaujolais	
Building	1	7 rue de Beaujolais	
Building	1	9 rue de Beaujolais	
Building	1	11-11 bis rue de Beaujolais	
Building	1	15 rue de Beaujolais	
Building	1	7 rue Bertin-Poirée	
Building	1	8-10 rue Bertin-Poirée	
Building	1	14 rue Bertin-Poirée; 19 rue Jean-Lantier	
Building	1	15 rue Bertin-Poirée	
Building	1	17 rue Bertin-Poirée	
Building	1	22 rue des Bourdonnais	
Building	1	24 rue des Bourdonnais	
Building	1	30 rue des Bourdonnais	
Building	1	20 rue Cambon	
Building	1	43 rue Croix-des-Petits-Champs	
Building	1	15 rue Danielle-Casanova	
Building	1	19 rue Danielle-Casanova	
Building	1	21 rue Danielle-Casanova	
Building	1	23 rue Danielle-Casanova; 2 impasse Gomboust	
Building	1	25-27 rue Danielle-Casanova	
Building	1	29 rue Danielle-Casanova	
Building	1	12 place Dauphine; 25 quai de l'Horloge	
Building	1	13 place Dauphine; 50 quai des Orfèvres	
Building	1	14 place Dauphine; 27 quai de l'Horloge	
Building	1	15 place Dauphine; 52-54 quai des Orfèvres	
Building	1	16 place Dauphine; 29 quai de l'Horloge	
Building	1	17 place Dauphine; 56 quai des Orfèvres	
Building	1	19-21 place Dauphine	
Building	1	23 place Dauphine	
Building	1	24 place Dauphine; 37 quai de l'Horloge	
Building	1	25 place Dauphine	
Building	1	26 place Dauphine; 39 quai de l'Horloge	
Building	1	27 place Dauphine	
Building	1	28 place Dauphine	
Building	1	29 place Dauphine; 74 quai des Orfèvres	
Building	1	31 place Dauphine; 15 place du Pont-Neuf; 76 quai des Orfèvres	
Building	1	3 rue des Deux-Boules; 12-14 bis rue Jean-Lantier	
Building	1	5 rue des Deux-Boules	
Building	1	7 rue des Deux-Boules	
Building	1	9-11 rue des Deux-Boules	
Building	1	13 rue des Deux-Boules; 18 rue Bertin-Poirée	
Building	1	2 rue de la Ferronnerie; 1-3 rue des Innocents; 43 rue Saint-Denis	
Building	1	4 rue de la Ferronnerie; 5-7 rue des Innocents	
Building	1	6-8 bis rue de la Ferronnerie; 9-13 rue des Innocents	
Building	1	10 rue de la Ferronnerie; 15 rue des Innocents	
Building	1	12-14 rue de la Ferronnerie; 17-21 rue des Innocents; 2 bis rue de la Lingerie	
Building	1	29 rue de la Ferronnerie	
Building	1	31 rue de la Ferronnerie	
Building	1	20 rue Hérold	
Building	1	19 quai de l'Horloge; 2 rue de Harlay	
Building	1	21 quai de l'Horloge	
Building	1	23 quai de l'Horloge	
Building	1	16-18 rue Jean-Lantier	
Building	1	42 rue de La Sourdière; 1 rue Gomboust	
Building	1	3-9 rue des Lavandières-Sainte-Opportune	
Building	1	11 rue des Lavandières-Sainte-Opportune	
Building	1	15 rue des Lavandières-Sainte-Opportune; Rue Jean-Lantier	
Building	1	17 rue des Lavandières-Sainte-Opportune; 1 rue des Deux-Boules	
Building	1	25 rue des Lavandières-Sainte-Opportune; 1 rue du Plat-d'Étain	
Building	1	62 rue des Lombards	
Building	1	14 quai de la Mégisserie	
Building	1	15 rue Montorgueil	
Building	1	17 rue Montorgueil	
Building	1	19 rue Montorgueil	
Building	1	10-12 rue de Montpensier	
Building	1	14-16 rue de Montpensier	
Building	1	18 rue de Montpensier	
Building	1	20 rue de Montpensier	
Building	1	22 rue de Montpensier	
Building	1	24 rue de Montpensier	
Building	1	26 rue de Montpensier	
Building	1	28 rue de Montpensier	
Building	1	30 rue de Montpensier	
Building	1	32 rue de Montpensier	
Building	1	34 rue de Montpensier	
Building	1	36 rue de Montpensier	
Building	1	4 rue des Moulins	
Building	1	5 rue des Moulins	
Building	1	6 rue des Moulins	
Building	1	8 rue des Moulins	
Building	1	10 rue des Moulins	
Building	1	23 avenue de l'Opéra; 22 rue d'Argenteuil	
Building	1	68-72 quai des Orfèvres	
Building	1	3 rue des Orfèvres	
Building	1	5 rue des Orfèvres	
Building	1	6 rue des Orfèvres	
Building	1	7 rue des Orfèvres	
Building	1	8 rue des Orfèvres	
Building	1	9 rue des Orfèvres	
Building	1	10 rue des Orfèvres; 13-15 rue Jean-Lantier; Rue des Lavandières-Sainte-Opportune	
Building	1	39 rue des Petits-Champs	
Building	1	61 rue des Petits-Champs	
Building	1	28 rue de Richelieu	
Building	1	39 rue de Richelieu; 6-6 bis rue Thérèse	
Building	1	40 rue de Richelieu; 37 rue de Montpensier	
Building	1	146 rue de Rivoli; 3-7 rue Bailleul	
Building	1	127 rue Saint-Denis	
Building	1	36 rue Sainte-Anne	
Building	1	6 rue Saint-Florentin	
Building	1	2 rue Saint-Germain-l'Auxerrois; 1 rue des Lavandières-Sainte-Opportune	
Building	1	5-7 rue Saint-Germain-l'Auxerrois	
Building	1	9 rue Saint-Germain-l'Auxerrois	
Building	1	10 rue Saint-Germain-l'Auxerrois; 1 rue des Orfèvres	
Building	1	12 rue Saint-Germain-l'Auxerrois	
Building	1	13 rue Saint-Germain-l'Auxerrois	
Building	1	14 rue Saint-Germain-l'Auxerrois	
Building	1	15 rue Saint-Germain-l'Auxerrois; 4 rue Bertin-Poirée	
Building	1	16 rue Saint-Germain-l'Auxerrois; 6 rue Bertin-Poirée	
Building	1	18 rue Saint-Germain-l'Auxerrois; 5 rue Bertin-Poirée	
Building	1	20-22 rue Saint-Germain-l'Auxerrois	
Building	1	24 rue Saint-Germain-l'Auxerrois	
Building	1	26-30 rue Saint-Germain-l'Auxerrois	
Building	1	47 rue Saint-Honoré	
Building	1	54 rue Saint-Honoré; 1 rue des Prouvaires	
Building	1	93 rue Saint-Honoré	
Building	1	97 rue Saint-Honoré	
Building	1	115 rue Saint-Honoré	
Building	1	334 rue Saint-Honoré	
Building	1	352 rue Saint-Honoré	
Building	1	366 rue Saint-Honoré	
Building	1	368-370 rue Saint-Honoré	
Building	1	372 rue Saint-Honoré	
Building	1	404 rue Saint-Honoré	
Building	1	5-7 rue Sauval	
Building	1	1 rue Thérèse	
Building	1	3 place de Valois	
Building	1	4 place de Valois; 7 rue des Bons-Enfants	
Building	1	5 place de Valois; 13-15 rue des Bons-Enfants	
Building	1	6 place de Valois; 9 rue des Bons-Enfants	
Building	1	7 place de Valois; 11 rue des Bons-Enfants	
Building	1	2 rue de Valois; 202 rue Saint-Honoré	
Building	1	4 rue de Valois; 2 place de Valois	
Building	1	6 rue de Valois; 1 place de Valois	
Building	1	8 rue de Valois; 17 rue des Bons-Enfants	
Building	1	9 rue de Valois	
Building	1	11 rue de Valois	
Building	1	13 rue de Valois	
Building	1	15 rue de Valois	
Building	1	17 rue de Valois	
Building	1	19 rue de Valois	
Building	1	21 rue de Valois	
Building	1	23 rue de Valois	
Building	1	25 rue de Valois	
Building	1	27 rue de Valois	
Building	1	29 rue de Valois	
Building	1	31 rue de Valois	
Building	1	33 rue de Valois	
Building	1	35-35 bis rue de Valois	
Building	1	37 rue de Valois	
Building	1	39 rue de Valois	
Building	1	41 rue de Valois	
Building	1	43 rue de Valois	
Building	1	2 rue La Vrillière	
Jardin des Tuileries	1	Quai du Louvre; Avenue du Général-Lemonnier; Rue de Rivoli	
Manège Duphot	1	10-14 rue Duphot	
Palais de justice	1	Boulevard du Palais	
Palais du Louvre	1	Quai du Louvre; Avenue du Général-Lemonnier; Rue de Rivoli	
Palais Royal	1	Place du Palais-Royal; 1-7 Rue de Valois; 2-8 Rue de Montpensier; Place Colette	
Passage des Deux-Pavillons	1	6, 8 rue de Beaujolais; 5 rue des Petits-Champs	
Place Dauphine	1	Place Dauphine	
Place des Victoires	1	Place des Victoires	
Pont des Arts	1	Pont des Arts	
Pont Neuf	1	Pont Neuf	
Pont Royal	1	Pont Royal	
L'Escargot Montorgueil	1	38 rue Montorgueil; 42 rue Mauconseil	
Grand Véfour	1	17 rue de Beaujolais	
Le Mercure galant	1	20 rue de Beaujolais; 15 rue des Petits-Champs	
Le Pharamond	1	24 rue de la Grande-Truanderie	
Sainte-Chapelle	1	Boulevard du Palais	
La Samaritaine	1	19 rue de la Monnaie; 34 rue de l'Arbre-Sec; 67 rue de Rivoli; 1 rue du Pont-Neuf	
Siège de la Semeuse de Paris	1	16 rue du Louvre; Rue Bailleul	
Statue of Henri IV	1	Place du Pont-Neuf	
Statue of Jeanne d'Arc	1	Place des Pyramides	
Statue of Louis XIV	1	Place des Victoires	
Temple de l'Oratoire du Louvre	1	145 rue Saint-Honoré	
Théâtre du Châtelet	1	Place du Châtelet; 2, 2 bis, 2 ter quai de la Mégisserie; 17 avenue Victoria	
Théâtre des Déchargeurs	1	3 rue des Déchargeurs	
Théâtre du Palais-Royal	1	38-40 rue de Montpensier; 21 rue de Beaujolais	
Annexe du siège central du Crédit lyonnais	2	6 rue Ménars	
Aux Belles Poules	2	32-34 rue Blondel	
Basilique Notre-Dame-des-Victoires	2	7 place des Petits-Pères	
Bibliothèque nationale de France	2	58 rue de Richelieu; 8 rue des Petits-Champs; Rue Colbert	
Bureau des Brodeurs et des Coffretiers	2	271 rue Saint-Denis	
Café-Bar	2	143 rue Saint-Denis	
Charcuterie	2	6 rue des Petits-Carreaux	
Boutique	2	121 rue Montmartre	
Édicule Guimard of the Quatre-Septembre station	2	Rue du Quatre-Septembre; Rue de Choiseul	
Édicule Guimard of the Réaumur - Sébastopol station	2	28 rue de Palestro; 63, 65 rue Réaumur	
Édicule Guimard of the Sentier station	2	87 rue Réaumur	
Église Notre-Dame-de-Bonne-Nouvelle	2	Rue Notre-Dame-de-Bonne-Nouvelle; Rue Beauregard; Rue de la Lune	
Enceinte of Philippe-Auguste	2	16 rue Étienne-Marcel; 15 rue Tiquetonne	
Enceinte of Philippe-Auguste	2	20 rue Étienne-Marcel	
Fontaine Colbert	2	6 rue Colbert	
Fontaine Gaillon	2	Rue de La Michodière; Place Gaillon	
Galerie Colbert	2	6 rue des Petits-Champs; 2, 2 bis, 4 rue Vivienne	
Galerie Vivienne	2	4 rue des Petits-Champs, 6 rue Vivienne; 5, 7 rue de la Banque	
Le Grand Rex	2	35 rue Poissonnière; 5 Boulevard Poissonnière	
Hôtel du 3 rue Louis-le-Grand	2	3 rue Louis-le-Grand	
Hôtel du 101 rue de Richelieu	2	101 rue de Richelieu	
Hôtel Le Tellier	2	5 rue du Mail	
Hôtel du Barry	2	2 bis, 2 ter rue de la Jussienne	
Hôtel Colbert de Torcy	2	16, 16 bis rue Vivienne	
Hôtel Cornette	2	12 place des Victoires	
Hôtel Desmarets	2	18 rue Vivienne	
Tour Jean-sans-Peur	2	20 rue Étienne-Marcel	
Hôtel de l'Europe et des Princes	2	97 rue de Richelieu	
Hôtel de La Feuillade	2	4 rue La Feuillade	
Hôtel Gigault de La Salle	2	10 place des Victoires; 8 rue des Petits-Pères	
Hôtel de L'Hospital	2	9 place des Victoires	
Hôtel de Metz de Rosnay	2	4 bis place des Victoires; 2 rue La Feuillade	
Hôtel de Mondragon	2	3 rue d'Antin	
Hôtel Montholon	2	23 Boulevard Poissonnière	
Hôtel de Nevers	2	12 rue Colbert; 58 bis rue de Richelieu	
Hôtel de Noisy	2	31 Rue de Cléry; 2 rue Poissonnière	
Hôtel d'Osmont	2	12 rue Saint-Sauveur; 23 rue Dussoubs	
Hôtel Pellé de Montaleau	2	8 place des Victoires	
Hôtel de Prévenchères	2	6 place des Victoires	
Hôtel Clairambault	2	2 rue Vide-Gousset; 1 Rue d'Aboukir	
Hôtel Rivié	2	30, 32 rue du Sentier	
Hôtel de Saint-Chaumont	2	226 rue Saint-Denis; 121 boulevard de Sébastopol	
Hôtel particulier	2	33 rue du Sentier; 8 rue Saint-Fiacre	
Building	2	4 Rue d'Aboukir	
Building	2	15 Rue d'Aboukir	
Buildings	2	1, 3, 5, 7, 9 rue d'Amboise	
Buildings	2	2, 4, 6, 8, 10 rue d'Amboise	
Building	2	10 rue Bachaumont	
Building	2	1 place Boieldieu	
Building	2	2 place du Caire	
Building	2	5 boulevard des Capucines	
Building	2	7 boulevard des Capucines	
Building	2	9 boulevard des Capucines	
Buildings	2	1, 2, 3, 4, 5, 7 rue des Colonnes	
Building	2	6 rue des Colonnes	
Building	2	15 rue Dussoubs	
Building	2	22 rue Dussoubs; 34 rue Greneta; 9, 11, 14 impasse Saint-Denis; 17 rue Saint-Sauveur	
Building	2	25, 25 bis, 27 rue Dussoubs; 14 rue Saint-Sauveur	
Buildings	2	1, 2, 4, 12, 14, 16, 18, 20 rue Favart	
Building	2	14 rue de Gramont	
Buildings	2	16, 18, 20 rue de Gramont	
Buildings	2	1, 3, 5 rue Grétry	
Buildings	2	2, 4, 6 rue Grétry	
Building	2	6 rue de Hanovre	
Building	2	5 bis, 7, 9 boulevard des Italiens	
Building	2	4 rue de Louvois	
Building	2	1 rue du Mail	
Building	2	6 rue du Mail	
Buildings	2	1, 3, 5, 7 rue de Marivaux	
Building	2	51 rue Montorgueil	
Building	2	73 rue Montorgueil; 1 rue Léopold-Bellan	
Building	2	10 rue Notre-Dame-des-Victoires	
Building	2	14 rue Notre-Dame-des-Victoires	
Building	2	4 place de l'Opéra; 11 boulevard des Capucines; 34 rue du Quatre-Septembre	
Building	2	15-17 rue Paul-Lelong	
Building	2	75-77 rue Réaumur; 33 rue Dussoubs	
Buildings	2	91-95 rue de Richelieu	
Building	2	99 rue de Richelieu	
Building	2	142 rue Saint-Denis; 28 rue Greneta	
Building	2	174 rue Saint-Denis	
Building	2	176 rue Saint-Denis; 2 passage Basfour	
Building	2	67 rue Sainte-Anne	
Building	2	69 rue Sainte-Anne	
Building	2	71 rue Sainte-Anne	
Building	2	18 rue Saint-Marc	
Buildings	2	28, 30, 32, 34, 36 rue Saint-Marc	
Building	2	16 rue Saint-Sauveur	
Building	2	18 rue Saint-Sauveur	
Building	2	20 rue Saint-Sauveur	
Building	2	22 rue Saint-Sauveur	
Building	2	22 rue du Sentier	
Building	2	10 rue Tiquetonne	
Building	2	13 rue Tiquetonne	
Building	2	15 rue Tiquetonne	
Building	2	31 rue Tiquetonne	
Town hall of Paris IIe arrondissement	2	8 rue de la Banque; 2 passage des Petits-Pères; 5 place des Petits-Pères	
Au Planteur	2	11, 12 rue des Petits-Carreaux	
Palais Brongniart	2	Place de la Bourse	
Passage Ben-Aïad	2	9-11 rue Léopold-Bellan; 8 rue Bachaumont	
Passage du Bourg-l'Abbé	2	3 rue de Palestro; 120 rue Saint-Denis	
Passage Choiseul and Passage Sainte-Anne	2	23 rue Saint-Augustin; 40 rue des Petits-Champs; 6-46 rue Dalayrac; 59, 61 rue Sainte-Anne	
Passage du Grand-Cerf	2	8, 10 rue Dussoubs; 145 rue Saint-Denis	
Passage des Panoramas	2	10 rue Saint-Marc; 11, 13 boulevard Montmartre; 38, 38 bis rue Vivienne	
Passage des Princes	2	95, 99 rue de Richelieu; 5 bis boulevard des Italiens; 2 rue d'Amboise	
Restaurant du Journal	2	98, 100, 102 rue de Richelieu; 20, 22 rue Saint-Marc	
Le Rocher de Cancale	2	78 rue Montorgueil; 73-75 rue Greneta	
La Samaritaine de Luxe	2	25-29 boulevard des Capucines; 18-24 rue Daunou	
Siège central du Crédit lyonnais	2	17, 19, 21 boulevard des Italiens; 16 rue de Choiseul; 25 rue de Gramont; 18 rue du Quatre-Septembre	
Siège du Parisien libéré	2	124 rue Réaumur	
Théâtre Daunou	2	7, 9 rue Daunou	
Salle Favart	2	5 rue Favart	
Théâtre des Variétés	2	7 boulevard Montmartre	
Ancien siège de la chambre de commerce de Paris	2	21, 21 bis rue Notre-Dame-des-Victoires	
Hôtel de Rohan and Hôtel de Soubise	3	58 rue des Archives; 54-60 rue des Francs-Bourgeois	
Bakery	3	29 rue de Poitou; 15 rue de Saintonge	
Boutique	3	13 rue Michel-le-Comte	
Boutique	3	67 rue de Turenne	
Boutique	3	79 rue Vieille-du-Temple	
Café-Bar	3	105 rue du Temple	
Central téléphonique Archives	3	106-108 rue du Temple	
Chapelle Saint-Julien-des-Enfants-Rouges	3	90 rue des Archives	
Collège Pierre-Jean-de-Béranger	3	5, 5 bis rue Béranger; 2 rue de la Corderie	
Couvent de la Merci	3	45 rue des Archives	
École élémentaire Beranger	3	3 rue Béranger; 2 rue de la Corderie	
Édicule Guimard of the Temple station	3	Rue du Temple; Rue de Turbigo	
Église Saint-Denys-du-Saint-Sacrement	3	68 bis rue de Turenne	
Église Sainte-Élisabeth-de-Hongrie	3	195 rue du Temple	
Église Saint-Nicolas-des-Champs	3	254 rue Saint-Martin	
Enceinte of Philippe-Auguste	3	69, 71 rue du Temple	
Fontaine Boucherat	3	133 rue de Turenne; 70 rue Charlot	
Fontaine des Haudriettes	3	1 rue des Haudriettes; Rue des Archives	
Fontaine de Joyeuse	3	41 rue de Turenne	
Fontaine Popincourt	3	48 rue de Sévigné	
Hôtel du 101-103 rue du Temple	3	101, 103 rue du Temple	
Hôtel d'Almeyras	3	30 rue des Francs-Bourgeois	
Hôtel de Tallard	3	78 rue des Archives; 12 rue Pastourelle	
Hôtel Salé	3	5 rue de Thorigny	
Hôtel de Bassompierre	3	23 place des Vosges	
Hôtel Beaubrun	3	17, 19 rue Michel-le-Comte	
Hôtel Beautru de la Vieuville	3	6 rue Pastourelle	
Hôtel de Bérancourt	3	28 rue Charlot	
Hôtel de Canillac	3	4 rue du Parc-Royal; 55 rue de Turenne	
Hôtel de Bonneval	3	14, 16 rue du Parc-Royal	
Hôtel du Cardinal de Richelieu	3	21 place des Vosges	
Hôtel Carnavalet	3	23 rue de Sévigné	
Hôtel Cornuel	3	7 rue Charlot	
Hôtel de Croisilles	3	12 rue du Parc-Royal	
Hôtel de Bondeville	3	4 rue des Haudriettes	
Hôtel Delisle-Mansart	3	22 rue Saint-Gilles	
Petit hôtel d'Estrées	3	70 rue des Gravilliers	
Hôtel de Donon	3	9 rue Payenne; 8 rue Elzévir	
Hôtel de l'Escalopier	3	25 place des Vosges	
Pavillon de la Reine	3	28 place des Vosges	
Hôtel Gégault de Crisenoy	3	16 rue des Quatre-Fils	
Hôtel de Gourgues	3	52, 54 rue de Turenne	
Hôtel d'Ecquevilly	3	60 rue de Turenne	
Hôtel de Guénégaud	3	60 rue des Archives; 24-30 rue des Quatre-Fils	
Hôtel d'Hallwyll	3	28 rue Michel-le-Comte; 17 rue de Montmorency	
Hôtel Hérouet	3	54 rue Vieille-du-Temple; 42 rue des Francs-Bourgeois	
Hôtel d'Hozier	3	110 rue Vieille-du-Temple; 9 rue Debelleyme	
Hôtel Jean Bart	3	4 rue Chapon	
Hôtel Le Ferron	3	20 rue des Quatre-Fils; 9 ruelle Sourdis	
Hôtel Le Lièvre	3	4, 6 rue de Braque	
Hôtel Le Peletier de Saint-Fargeau	3	29 rue de Sévigné; 14 rue Payenne	
Hôtel Le Pelletier de Souzy	3	76 rue des Archives; 19, 21 rue Pastourelle	
Hôtel Lemarié d'Aubigny	3	15 rue Barbette	
Hôtel Libéral Bruant	3	1 rue de la Perle; 1 place de Thorigny	
Hôtel du Lude	3	13 rue Payenne	
Hôtel de Marle	3	11 rue Payenne; 10 rue Elzévir	
Hôtel Mégret de Sérilly	3	106 rue Vieille-du-Temple	
Hôtel de Michel Simon	3	70 rue des Archives	
Hôtel de Montmor	3	79 rue du Temple	
Hôtel Thiroux de Lailly	3	5 rue de Montmorency	
Hôtel Mortier de Sandreville	3	26 rue des Francs-Bourgeois	
Hôtel de Percy	3	6, 8, 10 rue de Thorigny; 14, 16 rue du Parc-Royal	
Hôtel de Pologne	3	65 rue de Turenne	
Hôtel de Saint-Aignan	3	71-75 rue du Temple	
Hôtel Thirioux d'Arconville	3	22 rue des Quatre-Fils	
Hôtel de Tresmes	3	26 place des Vosges	
Hôtel de Vic	3	77 rue du Temple	
Hôtel de Vigny	3	10 rue du Parc-Royal	
Hôtel de Vitry	3	14, 14 bis rue des Minimes	
Hôtel de Vitry	3	24 place des Vosges	
Hôtel de Vouvray	3	6 rue du Parc-Royal	
Building	3	7 rue Bailly	
Building	3	7 rue des Gravilliers	
Building	3	15 rue Michel-le-Comte	
Building	3	65 rue Quincampoix; 64 rue Rambuteau	
Building	3	66 rue Quincampoix; 62 rue Rambuteau	
Building	3	67 rue Quincampoix	
Building	3	68 rue Quincampoix	
Building	3	69 rue Quincampoix	
Building	3	70 rue Quincampoix	
Building	3	71 rue Quincampoix	
Building	3	72 rue Quincampoix	
Building	3	73 rue Quincampoix	
Building	3	75 rue Quincampoix	
Building	3	77 rue Quincampoix	
Building	3	78 rue Quincampoix	
Building	3	79 rue Quincampoix	
Building	3	83 rue Quincampoix	
Building	3	84 rue Quincampoix	
Building	3	88 rue Quincampoix	
Building	3	91 rue Quincampoix	
Building	3	99 rue Quincampoix	
Building	3	105 rue Quincampoix	
Building	3	107 rue Quincampoix	
Building	3	109 rue Quincampoix	
Building	3	111 rue Quincampoix; 19 rue aux Ours	
Building	3	17 rue Saint-Gilles	
Building	3	145 rue Saint-Martin; Rue Rambuteau	
Building	3	147 rue Saint-Martin	
Building	3	149 rue Saint-Martin	
Building	3	151 rue Saint-Martin	
Building	3	155 rue Saint-Martin	
Building	3	160 rue Saint-Martin	
Building	3	163 rue Saint-Martin	
Building	3	165 rue Saint-Martin	
Building	3	167 rue Saint-Martin	
Building	3	169 rue Saint-Martin	
Buildings	3	175-177 rue Saint-Martin	
Building	3	179 rue Saint-Martin	
Building	3	181 rue Saint-Martin	
Building	3	183 rue Saint-Martin	
Building	3	185 rue Saint-Martin	
Building	3	187 rue Saint-Martin; 1 rue aux Ours	
Building	3	50 rue des Tournelles; 37 boulevard Beaumarchais	
Building	3	58 rue de Turenne; 24 rue Villehardouin	
Building	3	3 rue Volta	
Building	3	37 rue Volta	
House	3	72 rue des Archives	
House	3	11 rue Barbette	
House	3	113 boulevard Beaumarchais; 1 rue du Pont-aux-Choux	
House	3	8 rue de Braque	
House	3	62 rue Charlot	
House	3	56 rue des Francs-Bourgeois	
House	3	42 rue Meslay	
House	3	49 rue Meslay	
House	3	12 rue des Minimes	
House	3	8 rue de Saintonge	
House	3	76 rue de Turenne	
House	3	137 rue Vieille-du-Temple; 1 rue de Bretagne	
Auberge Nicolas Flamel	3	51 rue de Montmorency	
Marché des Enfants-Rouges	3	35, 37 rue Charlot; Rue de Bretagne; 16 rue de Beauce; Rue des Oiseaux	
Carreau du Temple	3	Rue de Picardie; 4 rue Eugène Spuller; Rue Perrée; Rue Dupetit-Thouars	
Prieuré Saint-Martin-des-Champs	3	270, 278, 292 rue Saint-Martin; 31-55 rue du Vertbois; Rue Vaucanson; Rue Réaumur	
Passage Molière	3	82 rue Quincampoix; 157-161 rue Saint-Martin	
Passage Vendôme	3	1, 5 place de la République; 16, 18 rue Béranger	
Pâtisserie	3	180 rue du Temple	
Pavillon	3	58 rue Charlot; 9 rue de Normandie	
Synagogue Nazareth	3	8 rue du Vertbois; 15 rue Notre-Dame-de-Nazareth	
Temple de l'Humanité	3	5 rue Payenne	
Théâtre Déjazet	3	41 boulevard du Temple	
Théâtre Directoire	3	117 rue Vieille-du-Temple; 6 rue de Saintonge	
Théâtre de la Gaîté	3	3 bis rue Papin	
Café de la Gare	4	41 rue du Temple	
Bibliothèque de l'Arsenal	4	1-3 rue de Sully; 18 boulevard Morland; Boulevard Henri-IV	
Butcher shop	4	4 rue Malher	
Bakery	4	29 rue des Francs-Bourgeois	
Bakery	4	23 rue des Francs-Bourgeois	
Bakery	4	62 rue de l'Hôtel-de-Ville; 2 rue des Barres	
Bakery	4	13 rue Malher; Rue des Rosiers	
Boutique	4	72 rue Saint-Antoine; 2 rue de Turenne	
Boutique	4	61 rue Saint-Louis-en-l'Île	
Boutique	4	120 rue Saint-Martin; 59 rue Simon-le-Franc	
Boutique Bougnat	4	80 rue François-Miron	
Brasserie Bofinger	4	3-7 rue de la Bastille; 1 rue Jean-Beausire	
Caserne Schomberg	4	4 rue de Schomberg	
Cathédrale Notre-Dame	4	Parvis Notre-Dame - Place Jean-Paul II	
Chapelle Saint-Aignan	4	24 rue Chanoinesse; 19 rue des Ursins	
Colonne de Juillet	4	Place de la Bastille	
Crédit municipal de Paris	4	14 rue des Blancs-Manteaux	
Crèmerie	4	6 rue du Pont-Louis-Philippe	
Débit de boisson	4	24 rue Chanoinesse	
École Massillon	4	2 quai des Célestins; Rue du Petit-Musc	
Édicule Guimard of the Cité station	4	Place Louis-Lépine; Rue de Lutèce; Marché aux Fleurs	
Église Notre-Dame-des-Blancs-Manteaux	4	12 rue des Blancs-Manteaux; 53 rue des Francs-Bourgeois	
Église Saint-Gervais-Saint-Protais	4	Place Saint-Gervais	
Église Saint-Louis-en-l'Île	4	3 rue Poulletier	
Église Saint-Merri	4	76 rue de la Verrerie	
Église Saint-Paul-Saint-Louis	4	99-101 rue Saint-Antoine	
Enceinte of Philippe-Auguste	4	9-15 rue Charlemagne	
Enceinte of Philippe-Auguste	4	17, 19, 21 rue des Jardins-Saint-Paul	
Enceinte of Philippe-Auguste	4	31, 33 rue des Francs-Bourgeois	
Enceinte of Philippe-Auguste	4	15 rue de l'Ave-Maria	
Enceinte of Philippe-Auguste	4	8, 10, 14, 16 rue des Rosiers	
Fontaine des Guillemites	4	10 rue des Blancs-Manteaux	
Fontaine de Jarente	4	Impasse de la Poissonnerie	
Fontaine Maubuée	4	Rue Saint-Martin; Rue de Venise	
Fontaines Wallace	4	Place Louis-Lépine	
Hôtel Amelot de Bisseuil	4	47 rue Vieille-du-Temple	
Hôtel d'Angennes de Rambouillet	4	20 place des Vosges	
Hôtel d'Angoulême Lamoignon	4	24 rue Pavée	
Hôtel de Sens	4	1 rue du Figuier	
Hôtel Arnaud	4	6 place des Vosges	
Hôtel d'Arvers	4	12 quai d'Orléans	
Hôtel d'Asfeldt	4	16 place des Vosges	
Hôtel d'Aubray	4	12 rue Charles-V	
Hôtel d'Aumont	4	5, 7 rue de Jouy	
Hôtel de Beauvais	4	68 rue François-Miron	
Hôtel de Bretonvilliers	4	9 rue Saint-Louis-en-l'Île; 3 rue de Bretonvilliers	
Hôtel Brulart	4	25 rue des Écouffes	
Hôtel de Chabannes	4	17 place des Vosges	
Hôtel de Chalon-Luxembourg	4	26 rue Geoffroy-l'Asnier	
Hôtel Le Charron	4	13-15 quai de Bourbon	
Hôtel de Châtillon	4	10 place des Vosges	
Hôtel de Chaulnes	4	9 place des Vosges	
Hôtel de Chavigny	4	7-9 rue de Sévigné	
Hôtel de Chenizot	4	51, 53 rue Saint-Louis-en-l'Île	
Hôtel de Clermont-Tonnerre	4	18 place des Vosges	
Hôtel de Comans d'Astry	4	18 quai de Béthune	
Hôtel Coulanges	4	1 bis place des Vosges; 11 bis rue de Birague	
Hôtel Dyel des Hameaux	4	13 place des Vosges; 14 rue de Turenne	
Hôtel de Fourcy	4	8 place des Vosges	
Hôtel Genou de Guiberville	4	2 place des Vosges	
Hôtel de Jassaud	4	19 quai de Bourbon; 26 rue Le Regrattier	
Hôtel Jeanne d'Albret	4	31 rue des Francs-Bourgeois	
Hôtel du Jeu de Paume	4	54 rue Saint-Louis-en-l'Île	
Hôtel Laffemas	4	22 place des Vosges; Rue du Pas-de-la-Mule	
Hôtel Lafont	4	12 place des Vosges	
Hôtel Lambert	4	2 rue Saint-Louis-en-l'Île	
Hôtel de Launay	4	12 rue des Lions-Saint-Paul	
Hôtel de Lauzun	4	17 quai d'Anjou	
Hôtel Lefebure de la Malmaison	4	20 quai de Béthune	
Hôtel de Sagonne	4	28 rue des Tournelles; 23 boulevard Beaumarchais	
Hôtel Marchand	4	15 place des Vosges; 16 rue de Turenne	
Hôtel de Mayenne	4	21 rue Saint-Antoine; 38, 40 rue du Petit-Musc	
Hôtel Meiland	4	19 quai d'Anjou; 20 rue Poulletier	
Hôtel de Montbrun	4	19 place des Vosges; Rue des Francs-Bourgeois	
Hôtel de Montmorin	4	3 place des Vosges	
Hôtel de la Motte-Montgaubert	4	12 rue Chanoinesse; 2, 4, 6 rue des Chantres; 1, 3 rue des Ursins	
Hôtel d'Ourscamp	4	44-48 rue François-Miron; 31 rue Geoffroy-l'Asnier	
Hôtel des Parlementaires de la Fronde	4	3 rue des Lions-Saint-Paul	
Hôtel Roualle de Boisgelin	4	29 quai de Bourbon	
Hôtel particulier	4	17 quai de Bourbon	
Hôtel particulier	4	7 rue Saint-Louis-en-l'Île; 6 rue de Bretonvilliers	
Hôtel particulier	4	11 rue Saint-Louis-en-l'Île	
Hôtel particulier	4	13 rue Saint-Louis-en-l'Île	
Hôtel particulier	4	29 rue Saint-Louis-en-l'Île	
Hôtel Pierrard	4	11 place des Vosges; 12 rue de Turenne	
Hôtel Pottier de Blancmesnil	4	9 rue Saint-Merri	
Hôtel du Président Hénault	4	82 rue François-Miron	
Hôtel Raoul de la Faye	4	5 rue Sainte-Croix-de-la-Bretonnerie	
Hôtel Le Rebours	4	12 rue Saint-Merri	
Hôtel de Ribault	4	14 place des Vosges	
Hôtel de la Salle	4	5 place des Vosges	
Hôtel de Sully	4	7, 7 bis place des Vosges	
Hôtel de Coulanges	4	35, 37 rue des Francs-Bourgeois	
Société des Cendres	4	39 rue des Francs-Bourgeois	
Hôtel Thuriot de la Rosière	4	10 rue des Lions-Saint-Paul	
Hôtel de Vibraye	4	15 rue Vieille-du-Temple; 56 rue du Roi-de-Sicile	
Hôtel de Ville de Paris	4	Place de l'Hôtel-de-Ville; Rue de Rivoli; Rue de Lobau	
Building	4	36 quai de Béthune	
Bibliothèque polonaise de Paris	4	6 quai d'Orléans	
Building	4	30-32 quai d'Orléans	
Building	4	3 quai d'Anjou	
Building	4	13 quai d'Anjou	
Building	4	7 rue Beautreillis	
Balcony of the Hôtel Hesselin	4	24 quai de Béthune	
Building	4	28 rue des Blancs-Manteaux	
Building	4	19 bis quai de Bourbon; 28 rue Le Regrattier	
Building	4	53 quai de Bourbon	
Building	4	42 quai des Célestins	
Building	4	23 rue des Écouffes	
Building	4	42 rue François-Miron	
École élémentaire des Hospitalières-Saint-Gervais	4	10 rue des Hospitalières-Saint-Gervais	
Building	4	80 rue de l'Hôtel-de-Ville	
Building	4	6 rue des Lombards	
Building	4	8 rue des Lombards	
Building	4	10 rue des Lombards	
Building	4	12 rue des Lombards	
Building	4	14 rue des Lombards	
Building	4	15 rue des Lombards	
Building	4	16 rue des Lombards; 2-4 rue Quincampoix	
Building	4	17 rue des Lombards	
Building	4	22 rue des Lombards	
Building	4	24 rue des Lombards	
Building	4	2 bis place des Vosges; 16 rue de Birague	
Building	4	6 rue Quincampoix	
Building	4	7 rue Quincampoix	
Building	4	8 rue Quincampoix	
Building	4	9 rue Quincampoix	
Building	4	10 rue Quincampoix	
Building	4	11 rue Quincampoix	
Building	4	12 rue Quincampoix	
Building	4	13 rue Quincampoix	
Building	4	14 rue Quincampoix	
Building	4	15 rue Quincampoix	
Building	4	16 rue Quincampoix	
Building	4	18 rue Quincampoix	
Building	4	20 rue Quincampoix	
Building	4	25 rue Quincampoix; Rue de La Reynie	
Building	4	27 rue Quincampoix	
Building	4	36 rue Quincampoix	
Building	4	38 rue Quincampoix	
Building	4	41 rue Quincampoix	
Building	4	42 rue Quincampoix	
Building	4	43 rue Quincampoix	
Building	4	44 rue Quincampoix	
Building	4	45 rue Quincampoix	
Building	4	55 rue Quincampoix	
Building	4	57 rue Quincampoix	
Building	4	58 rue Quincampoix	
Building	4	59 rue Quincampoix	
Building	4	60 rue Quincampoix	
Building	4	61 rue Quincampoix	
Building	4	62 rue Quincampoix	
Building	4	64 rue Quincampoix; 65 rue Rambuteau	
Building	4	4 rue Le Regrattier	
Building	4	14 rue Le Regrattier	
Building	4	9 rue du Renard	
Building	4	23 rue des Rosiers	
Building	4	8 rue Saint-Bon	
Building	4	10 rue Saint-Louis-en-l'Île	
Building	4	35 rue Saint-Louis-en-l'Île; 21 rue des Deux-Ponts	
Building	4	57 rue Saint-Martin; 2-4 rue des Lombards	
Building	4	59 rue Saint-Martin	
Building	4	61 rue Saint-Martin	
Building	4	63 rue Saint-Martin	
Building	4	65 rue Saint-Martin	
Building	4	67 rue Saint-Martin	
Building	4	69 rue Saint-Martin	
Building	4	71 rue Saint-Martin	
Building	4	73 rue Saint-Martin	
Building	4	75 rue Saint-Martin	
Building	4	76 rue Saint-Martin; 78 rue de la Verrerie	
Building	4	77 rue Saint-Martin	
Building	4	79 rue Saint-Martin	
Building	4	81 rue Saint-Martin	
Building	4	83 rue Saint-Martin	
Building	4	84 rue Saint-Martin	
Building	4	86 rue Saint-Martin	
Building	4	87 rue Saint-Martin	
Building	4	88 rue Saint-Martin	
Building	4	89 rue Saint-Martin	
Building	4	90 rue Saint-Martin	
Building	4	92 rue Saint-Martin	
Building	4	94 rue Saint-Martin	
Building	4	96 rue Saint-Martin	
Building	4	98 rue Saint-Martin	
Building	4	100 rue Saint-Martin; 49 rue Saint-Merri	
Building	4	111 rue Saint-Martin	
Building	4	113 rue Saint-Martin	
Building	4	115 rue Saint-Martin	
Building	4	117 rue Saint-Martin	
Building	4	119 rue Saint-Martin	
Building	4	121 rue Saint-Martin	
Building	4	123 rue Saint-Martin	
Building	4	125 rue Saint-Martin	
Building	4	127 rue Saint-Martin	
Building	4	131 rue Saint-Martin	
Building	4	133 rue Saint-Martin	
Building	4	141 rue Saint-Martin	
Building	4	143 rue Saint-Martin; 63 rue Rambuteau	
Building	4	41 rue Saint-Merri	
Building	4	43 rue Saint-Merri	
Building	4	45 rue Saint-Merri	
Building	4	47 rue Saint-Merri	
Building	4	62 rue de la Verrerie; 15 rue du Renard	
Building	4	63 rue de la Verrerie	
Building	4	70 rue de la Verrerie; 1 rue des Juges-Consuls	
Building	4	72 rue de la Verrerie	
Building	4	74 rue de la Verrerie	
Building	4	76 rue de la Verrerie	
Building	4	77 rue de la Verrerie; 13 rue du Renard	
Building	4	79 rue de la Verrerie	
Building	4	85 rue de la Verrerie	
Building	4	87 rue de la Verrerie	
Building	4	89 rue de la Verrerie	
Building	4	91 rue de la Verrerie; 12 rue Saint-Bon	
Building	4	93 rue de la Verrerie; 13 rue Saint-Bon	
Hôtel du 4 place des Vosges	4	4 place des Vosges	
Building	4	24 rue Saint-Louis-en-l'Île	
Building	4	28 rue du Bourg-Tibourg	
Buildings	4	2-14 rue François-Miron; 17 rue des Barres	
Buildings	4	30 rue François-Miron	
Lycée Charlemagne	4	101 rue Saint-Antoine; 14 rue Charlemagne	
House	4	2 rue Charles-V	
House	4	8 rue Saint-Paul; 18 rue des Lions-Saint-Paul	
House	4	9 rue Aubriot	
House	4	1 quai de Bourbon; 39 rue des Deux-Ponts	
House	4	22 rue Geoffroy-l'Asnier	
House	4	56 rue de l'Hôtel-de-Ville	
House	4	3 rue des Juges-Consuls; 5 rue du Cloître-Saint-Merri	
House	4	133 rue Saint-Antoine	
House	4	3 rue Saint-Louis-en-l'Île	
House	4	2 rue Saint-Merri; 25 rue du Temple	
House	4	11 rue Saint-Merri	
House	4	13 rue de Sévigné	
House	4	24 rue Vieille-du-Temple	
House	4	36 rue Vieille-du-Temple	
House	4	44 rue Vieille-du-Temple; 52 rue des Rosiers	
Maison de Jacques Cœur	4	38-42 rue des Archives	
Mémorial du martyr juif inconnu	4	17 rue Geoffroy-l'Asnier; 5 rue du Grenier-sur-l'Eau	
Mémorial des Martyrs de la Déportation	4	1-7 quai de l'Archevêché	
Pavillon du Roi	4	1 place des Vosges	
Petit Hôtel de Fourcy	4	6 rue de Fourcy	
Pont Marie	4	Pont Marie	
Prison de La Force	4	22 rue Pavée	
Sous-station Bastille	4	31 boulevard Bourdon; 5 rue de la Cerisaie; 18 rue de l'Arsenal	
Place des Vosges	4	Place des Vosges	
Synagogue de la rue Pavée	4	10 rue Pavée	
Synagogue de la rue des Tournelles	4	21 rue des Tournelles	
Temple des Billettes	4	22-26 rue des Archives	
Temple du Marais	4	17 rue Saint-Antoine	
Théâtre de la Ville	4	15 avenue Victoria	
Tour Saint-Jacques	4	Square de la tour Saint-Jacques	
Abbaye du Val-de-Grâce	5	Place Alphonse-Laveran	
Pavillon sud bordant la cour d'honneur de l'abbaye du Val-de-Grâce	5	279 rue Saint-Jacques	
Arènes de Lutèce	5	49 rue Monge	
Bibliothèque Sainte-Geneviève	5	10 place du Panthéon	
Butcher shop	5	6 rue Mouffetard	
Butcher shop	5	18 rue des Fossés-Saint-Jacques	
Bakery	5	16 rue des Fossés-Saint-Jacques	
Bakery	5	14 rue Monge	
Boutique	5	6 rue Frédéric-Sauton	
Cabaret du Père Lunette	5	4 rue des Anglais	
Carrières des Capucins	5		
Caserne des Gardes Françaises	5	7-11 rue Tournefort	
Charcuterie du Panthéon	5	200 rue Saint-Jacques	
Le Champo - Espace Jacques-Tati	5	1 rue Champollion; 51 rue des Écoles	
Collège de Beauvais	5	9 bis rue Jean-de-Beauvais	
Collège des Bernardins	5	24 rue de Poissy	
Collège de France	5	11 place Marcelin-Berthelot; Rue Saint-Jacques	
Collège des Écossais	5	65 rue du Cardinal-Lemoine	
Collège Fortet	5	19-21 rue Valette	
Collège des Irlandais	5	15 rue des Carmes	
Collège Sainte-Barbe	5	4 rue Valette; 13 impasse Chartière	
Collège des Trente-Trois	5	7 impasse des Bœufs; 11 passage du Clos-Bruneau; 34 rue de la Montagne-Sainte-Geneviève	
Couvent des Dames Bénédictines du Saint-Sacrement	5	29 rue Lhomond; 24 rue du Pot-de-Fer; 16-20 rue Tournefort	
Couvent des Feuillantines	5	10 rue des Feuillantines	
Crèmerie	5	202 rue Saint-Jacques	
École normale supérieure	5	45 rue d'Ulm	
École polytechnique	5	1-21 rue Descartes; 2-8 rue Clovis; 48-58 rue du Cardinal-Lemoine; 12-14 rue d'Arras; 22 rue Monge; 33-52 rue des Bernardins; 17-25 rue de la Montagne-Sainte-Geneviève	
Édicule Guimard of the Saint-Michel station	5	boulevard Saint-Michel; Rue de la Huchette	
Église Saint-Blaise	5	46-48 rue Galande	
Église Saint-Étienne-du-Mont	5	30 rue Descartes	
Église Saint-Jacques-du-Haut-Pas	5	rue Saint-Jacques; Rue de l'Abbé-de-l'Épée	
Église Saint-Julien-le-Pauvre	5	Square René-Viviani - Montebello	
Église Saint-Médard	5	144 rue Mouffetard	
Église Saint-Nicolas-du-Chardonnet	5	23 rue des Bernardins	
Église Saint-Séverin	5	Rue des Prêtres-Saint-Séverin	
Enceinte of Philippe-Auguste	5	9-11 rue d'Arras; 38-42 rue du Cardinal-Lemoine	
Enceinte of Philippe-Auguste	5	23-27 rue d'Arras; 48-50 rue du Cardinal-Lemoine	
Enceinte of Philippe-Auguste	5	17-19 rue du Cardinal-Lemoine; 28 rue des Fossés-Saint-Bernard	
Enceinte of Philippe-Auguste	5	45-47 rue Descartes; 4 rue Thouin; 60-68 rue du Cardinal-Lemoine; Rue Clovis	
Faculté de droit de Paris	5	12 place du Panthéon	
Faculté de médecine de Paris	5	13-15 rue de la Bûcherie	
Fontaine Cuvier	5	rue Cuvier; 2 Rue Linné	
Fontaine du Pot-de-Fer	5	60 rue Mouffetard	
Mosquée de Paris	5	39-47 rue Geoffroy-Saint-Hilaire; 2 rue Daubenton; 2 bis rue de Quatrefages; 2-10 rue Georges-Desplas	
Hôtel du 79 boulevard Saint-Michel	5	79 boulevard Saint-Michel; 8 impasse Royer-Collard	
Hôtel du 6 rue du Val-de-Grâce	5	6 rue du Val-de-Grâce	
Hôtel de Clermont-Tonnerre	5	27 quai de la Tournelle	
Hôtel de Cluny and Palais des Thermes	5	24 rue Du Sommerard	
Hôtel Le Brun	5	49 rue du Cardinal-Lemoine	
Hôtel Lesseville	5	65 rue Galande	
Hôtel de Longueville	5	289 rue Saint-Jacques	
Hôtel de Miramion	5	47-53 quai de la Tournelle	
Hôtel de Nesmond	5	55-57 quai de la Tournelle	
Hôtel Poufour du Petit	5	7 rue Lacépède	
Hôtel Saint-Haure	5	27 rue Lhomond	
Hôtel Scipion	5	13 rue Scipion	
Hôtel Colbert	5	11 rue de la Bûcherie; 5-7 rue de l'Hôtel-Colbert	
Building	5	8 rue Boutebrie	
Building	5	13 rue Champollion	
Building	5	15 rue Champollion	
Building	5	17 rue Champollion	
Building	5	9 rue de l'Estrapade	
Building	5	6 rue du Fouarre	
Building	5	42 rue Galande	
Building	5	1-3 rue des Grands-Degrés; 2 rue Maître-Albert	
Building	5	35 rue de la Harpe; 24 rue de la Parcheminerie	
Building	5	37 rue de la Harpe	
Building	5	45 rue de la Harpe	
Building	5	18 rue Laplace	
Building	5	30 rue Lhomond	
Building	5	47 rue de la Montagne-Sainte-Geneviève	
Building	5	51 rue de la Montagne-Sainte-Geneviève	
Building	5	60 rue de la Montagne-Sainte-Geneviève; 1 rue Laplace	
Building	5	9 quai de Montebello	
Building	5	122 rue Mouffetard	
Building	5	134 rue Mouffetard	
Building	5	29 rue de la Parcheminerie	
Building	5	4 rue Royer-Collard	
Building	5	9 rue Royer-Collard	
Building	5	16 rue Saint-Étienne-du-Mont	
Building	5	53 boulevard Saint-Germain	
Building	5	67 rue Saint-Jacques	
Building	5	151 bis rue Saint-Jacques	
Building	5	271 rue Saint-Jacques	
Building	5	273 rue Saint-Jacques	
Building	5	275 rue Saint-Jacques	
Building	5	277 rue Saint-Jacques	
Building	5	284 rue Saint-Jacques	
Building	5	14 rue Saint-Julien-le-Pauvre	
Building	5	14 rue Saint-Victor	
Immeuble Le Couteur	5	29 rue Jean-de-Beauvais; 16 rue de Lanneau	
Imprimerie royale de Musique	5	7 rue Valette	
Institut national des jeunes sourds	5	252 bis rue Saint-Jacques	
Institut océanographique	5	195 rue Saint-Jacques; 29 rue Gay-Lussac	
Jardin des plantes and Muséum national d'histoire naturelle	5	Rue Cuvier; Rue Geoffroy-Saint-Hilaire; Rue Buffon; Quai Saint-Bernard; Place Valhubert; Boulevard de l'Hôpital	
Lycée Henri-IV	5	23 rue Clovis	
Lycée Louis-le-Grand	5	123 rue Saint-Jacques	
Town hall of Paris Ve arrondissement	5	13 place du Panthéon	
Maison du sculpteur Rude	5	17 rue Henri-Barbusse	
Maison des trois porcelets	5	31 rue Galande	
Schola Cantorum	5	269-269 bis rue Saint-Jacques	
Panthéon	5	Place du Panthéon	
Maison de la Mutualité	5	24 rue Saint-Victor; 28 rue de Pontoise	
Pavillon	5	5 rue Geoffroy-Saint-Hilaire	
Piscine Pontoise	5	17 rue de Pontoise	
Presbytère de l'église Saint-Étienne-du-Mont	5	30 rue Descartes	
La Sorbonne	5	45-47 rue des Écoles; 46-56 rue Saint-Jacques; 5-17 rue de la Sorbonne; 1 rue Victor-Cousin; 12-14 rue Cujas	
Bibliothèque interuniversitaire santé	6	12 rue de l'École-de-Médecine; Place Henri-Mondor; 83-85 boulevard Saint-Germain	
Académie nationale de médecine	6	16 rue Bonaparte	
Académie royale de médecine	6	5 rue de l'École-de-Médecine	
Butcher shop	6	62 rue de Vaugirard	
Boutique	6	13 rue du Cherche-Midi	
Brasserie Lipp	6	151 boulevard Saint-Germain	
La Palette	6	43 rue de Seine; 18 rue Jacques-Callot	
Café Procope	6	13 rue de l'Ancienne-Comédie	
Caserne de la Garde Républicaine	6	10 rue de Tournon	
Cathédrale Saint-Vladimir-le-Grand	6	49-51, rue des Saints-Pères	
Chapelle Notre-Dame-des-Anges	6	102 bis rue de Vaugirard	
Le Vagenende	6	142 boulevard Saint-Germain	
Collège Stanislas	6	28 rue du Montparnasse; 16, 22 rue Notre-Dame-des-Champs	
Cour du Commerce-Saint-André	6	59-61 rue Saint-André-des-Arts; 130 boulevard Saint-Germain; Rue de l'Ancienne-Comédie	
Institut catholique de Paris	6	19-21 rue d'Assas; 70 rue de Vaugirard	
Couvent des Cordeliers	6	15 rue de l'École-de-Médecine	
École Nationale Supérieure des Beaux-Arts	6	14 rue Bonaparte; 11-17 quai Malaquais	
Crèmerie	6	70 rue Bonaparte	
La Grille Saint Germain	6	1 rue Guisarde	
Au petit Maure	6	26 rue de Seine	
École	6	85 rue de Vaugirard	
Institut international d'administration publique	6	2 avenue de l'Observatoire; 9, 11 rue Auguste-Comte	
Édicule Guimard of the Saint-Michel station	6	Place Saint-André-des-Arts	
Église Saint-Germain-des-Prés	6	3 place Saint-Germain-des-Prés	
Église Saint-Sulpice	6	Place Saint-Sulpice	
Enceinte of Philippe-Auguste	6	Cour du Commerce-Saint-André; Cour de Rohan	
Enceinte of Philippe-Auguste	6	11 quai de Conti	
Enceinte of Philippe-Auguste	6	34 rue Dauphine; Passage Dauphine; 35 rue Mazarine	
Enceinte of Philippe-Auguste	6	13 rue de Nesle; Impasse de Nevers; 27, 29 rue Guénégaud	
Fontaine du Marché-aux-Carmes	6	Square Gabriel-Pierné; Rue de Seine; Rue Mazarine	
Fontaine de la Paix	6	Rue Bonaparte	
Fontaine Médicis	6	Jardin du Luxembourg	
Fontaine des Quatre-Parties-du-Monde	6	Avenue de l'Observatoire	
Fontaine Saint-Michel	6	Place Saint-Michel	
Fontaine Saint-Sulpice	6	Place Saint-Sulpice	
Bouillon Racine	6	3 rue Racine	
Grand Hôtel d'Entragues	6	12 rue de Tournon	
Hôtel de Fécamp	6	5 rue Hautefeuille	
Hôtel d'Aguesseau	6	18 rue Séguier	
Hôtel de Rochambeau	6	40 rue du Cherche-Midi	
Hôtel de Beaune	6	7 rue du Regard; 70 boulevard Raspail	
Hôtel de Beligny	6	12 rue Guénégaud	
Hôtel de Brancas	6	6 rue de Tournon	
Hôtel de Chambon	6	95 rue du Cherche-Midi	
Hôtel Charles-Testu	6	26 rue de Condé	
Hôtel de Choiseul-Praslin	6	111 rue de Sèvres; 2-8 rue Saint-Romain	
Hôtel de Claude-Turcat	6	14 rue de Condé	
Hôtel des Comédiens ordinaires du roi	6	14 rue de l'Ancienne-Comédie	
Hôtel du Docteur Coste	6	42 rue du Cherche-Midi	
Hôtel Feydeau de Montholon	6	35 quai des Grands-Augustins; 2 rue Séguier	
Hôtel de Foretz	6	21 rue Hautefeuille	
Hôtel de Furstemberg	6	3, 5, 7 rue de l'Abbaye	
Hôtel de Garsaulan	6	5 quai Malaquais	
Hôtel d'Hercule	6	5-7 rue des Grands-Augustins	
Hôtel Lutetia	6	23 rue de Sèvres; 43-51 boulevard Raspail; Place Alphonse-Deville	
Hôtel de Luynes	6	5 rue Gît-le-Cœur	
Hôtel de Luzy	6	6 rue Férou	
Hôtel Machelet de Velye	6	10 rue de Condé	
Hôtel de Marsilly	6	18 rue du Cherche-Midi	
Hôtel de la Monnaie	6	11 quai de Conti; Rue Guénégaud	
Hôtel de Montmorency-Bours	6	89 rue du Cherche-Midi	
Hôtel de Montmorency-Fosseux	6	4 rue de Tournon	
Hôtel de Mouy	6	31 rue Dauphine	
Hôtel particulier	6	19 rue Bonaparte; Rue Visconti	
Hôtel de Rothembourg	6	5 rue du Regard; 68 boulevard Raspail	
Hôtel de Saint-Cyr	6	19 rue des Grands-Augustins	
Hôtel de Saxe	6	3 quai Malaquais	
Hôtel Séguier	6	16 rue Séguier	
Hôtel Sillery-Genlis	6	13 quai de Conti; 2 impasse de Conti	
Hôtel de Sourdéac	6	8 rue Garancière	
Petit Hôtel de Sourdéac	6	12 rue de Condé	
Hôtel du Tillet de la Bussière	6	52 rue Saint-André-des-Arts	
Hôtel de Transylvanie	6	9 quai Malaquais	
Hôtel de Turenne	6	25 boulevard du Montparnasse	
Mines ParisTech	6	60-62 boulevard Saint-Michel	
Building	6	28 rue Bonaparte; 34 rue Jacob	
Building	6	38 rue Bonaparte	
Building	6	2 rue de Bourbon-le-Château; 26 rue de Buci	
Building	6	12 rue de Buci	
Building	6	28-30 rue de Buci; 1 rue de Bourbon-le-Château	
Building	6	18 rue des Canettes	
Building	6	7 rue Cassette	
Building	6	17 rue Cassette	
Buildings	6	19-21 rue Cassette	
Building	6	20 rue Cassette	
Hôtel de Saint-Simon	6	17 rue du Cherche-Midi	
Building	6	44 rue du Cherche-Midi	
Building	6	5 rue Christine	
Building	6	7 rue Christine	
Building	6	5 rue de Condé	
Building	6	7 rue de Condé	
Building	6	9 rue de Condé	
Building	6	11 rue de Condé	
Building	6	13 rue de Condé	
Building	6	15 rue de Condé	
Building	6	28 rue de Condé	
Building	6	30 rue de Condé	
Immeuble Hennebique	6	1 rue Danton	
Building	6	2 rue de l'École-de-Médecine	
Building	6	10 rue de l'Éperon; 16 rue du Jardinet	
Building	6	3 rue Garancière	
Building	6	12 rue Garancière	
Building	6	10 rue Gît-le-Cœur	
Building	6	14 rue Guynemer	
Building	6	11 rue Jacob	
Building	6	13 rue Jacob	
Building	6	52 rue Jacob	
Building	6	4 rue Mazarine	
Building	6	7-9 rue Mazarine	
Building	6	11 rue Mazarine	
Building	6	10 rue Monsieur-le-Prince	
Building	6	1 place de l'Odéon; 21 rue de l'Odéon; 10 rue Casimir-Delavigne	
Building	6	2 place de l'Odéon; 7 rue Crébillon; 22 rue de l'Odéon	
Building	6	3 place de l'Odéon; 11 rue Casimir-Delavigne; 30 rue Racine	
Building	6	4 place de l'Odéon; 8 rue Crébillon; Rue Regnard	
Building	6	5 place de l'Odéon; 25 rue Racine	
Building	6	6 place de l'Odéon; Rue Regnard	
Building	6	7 place de l'Odéon; 1, 3 rue Corneille	
Building	6	8 place de l'Odéon; 2 rue Rotrou	
Building	6	1 rue de l'Odéon; 2 rue Monsieur-le-Prince	
Building	6	2 rue de l'Odéon; 1 rue de Condé	
Building	6	3 rue de l'Odéon	
Building	6	5 rue de l'Odéon	
Building	6	6 rue de l'Odéon	
Building	6	7 rue de l'Odéon	
Building	6	8 rue de l'Odéon	
Building	6	9 rue de l'Odéon	
Building	6	10 rue de l'Odéon	
Building	6	12 rue de l'Odéon	
Building	6	14 rue de l'Odéon	
Building	6	140 bis rue de Rennes	
Building	6	15 rue des Saints-Pères	
Building	6	41 rue de Seine	
Building	6	54 rue de Seine	
Building	6	57 rue de Seine	
Building	6	21 rue de Sèvres	
Building	6	8 rue de Tournon	
Building	6	29 rue de Tournon; 32 rue de Condé	
Building	6	31 rue de Tournon	
Building	6	26 rue Vavin	
Immeuble du Cercle de la Librairie	6	117 boulevard Saint-Germain	
Immeuble de la Congrégation de la Mission des Lazaristes	6	93, 95, 97 rue de Sèvres; 88, 90, 92 rue du Cherche-Midi	
Immeuble du Crédit municipal de Paris	6	15 rue du Regard	
Institut d'Art et d'Archéologie	6	3 rue Michelet; 8 avenue de l'Observatoire; 2 rue des Chartreux	
Lycée Fénelon	6	45 rue Saint-André-des-Arts	
Lycée Saint-Louis	6	42 boulevard Saint-Michel	
House	6	10 rue de l'Abbaye	
House	6	5 rue Bonaparte	
House	6	7 rue Bonaparte	
House	6	9 rue Bonaparte	
House	6	88 rue Bonaparte	
House	6	18 rue Cassette	
House	6	22 rue Cassette	
House	6	26, 26 bis rue Cassette	
House	6	11 rue du Cherche-Midi	
House	6	19 rue du Cherche-Midi	
House	6	87 rue du Cherche-Midi	
House	6	10 rue des Ciseaux; Rue du Four	
House	6	3 rue de Condé	
House	6	14 rue des Grands-Augustins; 1 rue Christine	
House	6	20 rue de l'Hirondelle	
House	6	19 rue Mazarine	
House	6	51 rue Mazarine; 52 rue Dauphine	
House	6	4 rue Monsieur-le-Prince	
House	6	58 rue Monsieur-le-Prince	
Hôtel de Dreux-Brézé	6	1 rue du Regard; 64 boulevard Raspail	
House	6	13 rue du Regard	
House	6	27 rue Saint-André-des-Arts	
House	6	47 rue Saint-André-des-Arts	
House	6	49 rue Saint-André-des-Arts	
House	6	27 rue Saint-Sulpice	
House	6	10 rue Séguier	
House	6	6, 8 rue de Seine	
House	6	14 rue Servandoni	
House	6	2 rue de Tournon	
House	6	14 rue de Tournon	
Maison de Servandoni	6	6 place Saint-Sulpice	
Musée Delacroix	6	Rue de Furstemberg	
Musée Hébert	6	85 rue du Cherche-Midi	
Palais de l'Institut	6	Quai de Conti	
Palais du Luxembourg	6	Rue de Vaugirard	
Pavillons	6	137 rue de Sèvres	
Piscine Lutetia	6	17 rue de Sèvres	
Place de l'Odéon	6	Place de l'Odéon	
Le Montparnasse 1900	6	59 boulevard du Montparnasse	
Restaurant des Saints-Pères	6	175 boulevard Saint-Germain	
Séminaire	6	9 place Saint-Sulpice	
Statue of Michel Ney by François Rude	6	Avenue de l'Observatoire	
Temple de l'Amitié	6	20 rue Jacob	
Théâtre de l'Odéon	6	Place de l'Odéon	
Théâtre du Vieux-Colombier	6	21 rue du Vieux-Colombier	
Abbaye de Penthemont	7	37-39 rue de Bellechasse; 104-106 rue de Grenelle	
Butcher shop	7	69 rue du Bac	
Butcher shop	7	28 rue Cler	
Bakery	7	64 rue Saint-Dominique	
Bakery	7	112 rue Saint-Dominique	
Bakery	7	56 rue Vaneau	
La Boulangerie des Invalides-Jocteur	7	14 avenue de Villars	
À la Petite Chaise	7	36 rue de Grenelle	
Chapelle des Catéchismes	7	29 rue Las Cases	
La Pagode	7	57 rue de Babylone; 1 rue Monsieur	
Commerce d'alimentation	7	94 rue du Bac	
Debauve & Gallais	7	30 rue des Saints-Pères	
Crèmerie	7	41 avenue de La Bourdonnais	
Crèmerie	7	41 rue de Bourgogne	
École Militaire	7	Place Joffre	
École nationale des Ponts et Chaussées	7	26-28 rue des Saints-Pères	
Église Saint-Pierre-du-Gros-Caillou	7	92 rue Saint-Dominique	
Fontaine du Gros-Caillou	7	129, 131 rue Saint-Dominique	
Fontaine des Quatre-Saisons	7	59 rue de Grenelle	
Musée d'Orsay	7	7-9 quai Anatole-France; Rue de Lille	
Hôpital Laënnec	7	40-42 rue de Sèvres; 65-79 rue Vaneau; 4 impasse Oudinot	
Enseigne d'horlogerie	7	93 rue Saint-Dominique	
Hôtel de Montmorin	7	27 rue Oudinot	
Hôtel particulier	7	90 rue de Sèvres	
Hôtel d'Aligre	7	15 rue de l'Université	
Hôtel d'Auterive	7	3 rue de Beaune	
Hôtel de Béarn	7	123 rue Saint-Dominique; 22-24 avenue Bosquet; 1-15 rue de l'Exposition	
Hôtel de Beauffremont	7	87 rue de Grenelle	
Hôtel Beauharnais	7	78 rue de Lille	
Hôtel de Masseran	7	11 rue Masseran; 2 rue Duroc	
Hôtel de Bérulle	7	15 rue de Grenelle	
Hôtel de Besenval	7	142 rue de Grenelle	
Musée Rodin	7	77 rue de Varenne	
Hôtel de Bourbon-Condé	7	12 rue Monsieur	
Hôtel de Brienne	7	14-16 rue Saint-Dominique	
Hôtel de Broglie	7	35-37 rue Saint-Dominique; 9-13 rue de Bourgogne; 30 bis-32 rue Las Cases	
Hôtel Brongniart	7	49 boulevard des Invalides	
Hôtel de Cambacérès	7	21 rue de l'Université; 2 rue de Montalembert; 2 rue Sébastien-Bottin	
Hôtel de Cassini	7	32 rue de Babylone	
Hôtel de Castries	7	72 rue de Varenne	
Hôtel de Cavoye	7	52 rue des Saints-Pères	
Hôtel de Chanaleilles	7	2 rue de Chanaleilles; 24 rue Vaneau	
Hôtel du Châtelet	7	127 rue de Grenelle	
Hôtel de Clermont	7	69 rue de Varenne; 6-8 rue Barbet-de-Jouy	
Hôtel de Clermont-Tonnerre	7	118 rue du Bac	
Hôtel de Courteilles	7	110 rue de Grenelle	
Hôtel Delaforest	7	13 rue Vaneau	
Hôtel Duprat	7	60 rue de Varenne; 51 rue de Bellechasse	
Hôtel de La Feuillade	7	101 rue du Bac	
Hôtel Gouffier de Thoix	7	56 rue de Varenne	
Hôtel de Gournay	7	1 rue Saint-Dominique	
Hôtel des Invalides	7	129 rue de Grenelle	
Hôtel de Jarnac	7	8 rue Monsieur	
Hôtel Kinski	7	53 rue Saint-Dominique	
Hôtel de Laigue	7	16 rue Saint-Guillaume	
Hôtel de Lannion	7	75 rue de Lille	
Hôtel de Laubespin	7	78 rue de l'Université	
Hôtel de Mailly-Nesle	7	29 quai Voltaire; 2-4 rue de Beaune	
Hôtel de Martignac	7	107 rue de Grenelle	
Hôtel Matignon	7	57 rue de Varenne	
Hôtel du ministre des Affaires étrangères	7	37 quai d'Orsay	
Hôtel de Montalivet	7	58 rue de Varenne	
Hôtel Montesquiou-Fezensac	7	20 rue Monsieur	
Hôtel de Narbonne	7	45 rue de Varenne	
Hôtel de Noirmoutier	7	138 rue de Grenelle	
Hôtel particulier	7	21 rue du Bac	
Hôtel particulier	7	99 rue du Bac	
Hôtel particulier	7	120 rue du Bac	
Hôtel particulier	7	46 rue de Bourgogne	
Hôtel particulier	7	11 bis rue Casimir-Périer	
Hôtel particulier	7	14 rue Saint-Guillaume	
Hôtel de Périgord	7	3 rue Saint-Dominique	
Hôtel de Pomereu	7	67 rue de Lille	
Hôtel de Praslin	7	48 rue de Bourgogne	
Hôtel de Ravannes	7	41-43 rue Saint-Dominique	
Hôtel de Richepanse	7	3, 5 rue Masseran	
Hôtel de la Rochefoucauld-Doudeauville	7	47 rue de Varenne	
Hôtel de Rohan-Chabot	7	61 rue de Varenne	
Hôtel de Roquelaure	7	246 boulevard Saint-Germain	
Hôtel Rothelin-Charolais	7	101 rue de Grenelle	
Hôtel de Sainte-Aldegonde	7	102 rue du Bac	
Hôtel de Salm	7	64 rue de Lille; 1 rue de Solférino; 2 rue de Bellechasse; Quai Anatole-France	
Hôtel de Salm-Dyck	7	97 rue du Bac	
Hôtel de Samuel Bernard	7	46 rue du Bac	
Hôtel de Seignelay	7	80 rue de Lille	
Hôtel de Sénecterre	7	24 rue de l'Université; 17-19 rue de Verneuil	
Hôtel de Sommery	7	115 rue de Grenelle	
Hôtel de Maisons	7	51 rue de l'Université	
Hôtel de Stahrenberg	7	77 rue de Lille	
Hôtel de Tavannes	7	5 rue Saint-Dominique	
Hôtel de Tessé	7	1 quai Voltaire; 2 rue des Saints-Pères	
Hôtel de Vaudreuil	7	7 rue de la Chaise	
Hôtel des Vertus	7	3 rue de la Chaise	
Hôtel de Vilette	7	27 quai Voltaire; 1 rue de Beaune	
Hôtel de Villeroy	7	78 rue de Varenne	
Building	7	6 rue de Bourgogne	
Siège de la Fondation Charles de Gaulle	7	5 rue de Solférino	
Building	7	8 place du Palais-Bourbon; 4 rue de Bourgogne	
Building	7	37 avenue de Breteuil	
Building	7	8 rue de Bourgogne; 22 rue Saint-Dominique	
Building	7	1 avenue Charles-Floquet	
Hôtel de Parieu	7	14 rue Las Cases; 19 rue Saint-Dominique	
Building	7	13 rue de Lille	
Building	7	30 rue de Lille	
Building	7	79 rue du Bac	
Building	7	9 rue de la Chaise	
Building	7	3 square Rapp	
Immeuble Lavirotte	7	29 avenue Rapp	
Building	7	32 rue Saint-Guillaume	
Building	7	18 rue Sédillot	
Building	7	9, 11 place du Palais-Bourbon; 7 rue de Bourgogne	
Immeuble Les Arums	7	33 rue du Champ-de-Mars	
Immeuble de la Caisse des Dépôts et Consignations	7	2 rue du Bac	
Immeuble de la Société théosophique	7	4 square Rapp	
Buildings	7	9-11 rue de Bourgogne; 18-20 rue Saint-Dominique	
Institut national des jeunes aveugles	7	57 boulevard des Invalides; Rue Duroc; Rue de Sèvres; Rue Maurice-de-La-Sizeranne	
Town hall of Paris VIIe arrondissement	7	116 rue de Grenelle	
House	7	98 rue du Bac	
House	7	26 rue de Lille	
House	7	1-3 place du Palais-Bourbon	
House	7	2 place du Palais-Bourbon	
House	7	4 place du Palais-Bourbon	
House	7	5 place du Palais-Bourbon	
House	7	6, 6 bis place du Palais-Bourbon	
House	7	7, 7 bis place du Palais-Bourbon	
House	7	6 rue des Saints-Pères; 1 rue de Lille	
Maison de Verre	7	31 rue Saint-Guillaume	
Maison des Filles de la Charité	7	136-140 rue du Bac	
Ancien ministère de la marine marchande	7	3 place de Fontenoy	
Monastère de l'Immaculée-Conception	7	83, 85 rue du Bac	
Noviciat des Dominicains	7	Place Saint-Thomas-d'Aquin	
Palais de l'Alma	7	11 quai Branly	
Passerelle Debilly	7		
Petit Hôtel de Villars	7	118 rue de Grenelle	
Pharmacy	7	54 avenue de La Bourdonnais	
Pharmacy	7	151 rue de Grenelle	
Pharmacy	7	23 avenue Rapp	
Pont Alexandre-III	7		
Pont de la Concorde	7		
Pont d'Iéna	7		
Eiffel Tower	7	Champ-de-Mars	
Arc de Triomphe de l'Étoile	8	Place Charles de Gaulle	
Bakery	8	12 rue des Saussaies	
Boutique	8	6 rue Chauveau-Lagarde	
Au roi de la bière	8	119 rue Saint-Lazare	
Brasserie Mollard	8	113, 115 rue Saint-Lazare	
Chez Raspoutine	8	101 avenue des Champs-Élysées; 55 avenue George-V; 58 rue de Bassano; 8, 10 rue Vernet	
Cathédrale américaine de Paris	8	23 avenue George-V	
Cathédrale Saint-Alexandre-Nevsky	8	12 rue Daru	
Céramic Hôtel	8	34 avenue de Wagram	
Chapelle expiatoire	8	22 rue Pasquier	
Chapelle Notre-Dame-de-Consolation	8	23 rue Jean-Goujon	
Cité Berryer	8	25 rue Royale; 3-5, 14-16 cité Berryer; 24 rue Boissy-d'Anglas	
Édicule Guimard of the Europe station	8	Rue de Madrid	
Édicule Guimard of the Saint-Lazare station	8	Rue de Rome; Rue de l'Arcade	
Église de la Madeleine	8	Place de la Madeleine	
Église Saint-Augustin	8	Place Saint-Augustin	
Église Saint-Philippe-du-Roule	8	Place de la Madeleine	
Galerie de la Madeleine	8	9 place de la Madeleine; 30 rue Boissy-d'Anglas; 1 boulevard Malesherbes	
Gare Saint-Lazare	8	9, 11, 13, 15 rue d'Amsterdam; 108, 110 rue Saint-Lazare; Rue de Rome	
Grand Palais	8	Avenue Winston-Churchill; Avenue Franklin-D.-Roosevelt; Cours la Reine; Avenue du Général-Eisenhower	
Hôpital Beaujon	8	208 rue du Faubourg-Saint-Honoré	
Hôtel du 12 rue de Courcelles	8	12 rue de Courcelles	
Hôtel de Beauharnais	8	57 boulevard Haussmann; 32 rue des Mathurins	
Hôtel Cail	8	56 boulevard Malesherbes; 1, 1 bis, 3 rue de Lisbonne; 13 rue du Général-Foy	
Hôtel de Camondo	8	61 rue de Monceau	
Hôtel Cartier	8	8 place de la Concorde	
Hôtel Claridge	8	74 avenue des Champs-Élysées	
Hôtel de Coislin	8	4 place de la Concorde; 1 rue Royale	
Hôtel de Crillon	8	10 place de la Concorde; 2 rue Boissy-d'Anglas	
Hôtel de l'Impératrice Eugénie	8	2 rue de l'Élysée	
Hôtel Lalique	8	40 cours Albert-Ier	
Hôtel Landolfo-Carcano	8	1 rue de Tilsitt	
Hôtel de Marigny	8	23 avenue de Marigny	
Hôtel de Beauvau	8	Place Beauvau; Rue Cambacérès; 11 rue des Saussaies	
Hôtel Moïse de Camondo	8	61 bis, 63 rue de Monceau	
Hôtel de la Païva	8	25 avenue des Champs-Élysées	
Hôtel Pillet-Will	8	31 rue du Faubourg-Saint-Honoré	
Plaza Athénée	8	23-27 avenue Montaigne	
Hôtel du Plessis-Bellière	8	6 place de la Concorde	
Hôtel Potocki	8	27 avenue de Friedland	
Hôtel de Pourtalès	8	7 rue Tronchet	
Hôtel de la Princesse Mathilde	8	10 rue de Courcelles	
Hôtel de Rohan-Montbazon	8	29 rue du Faubourg-Saint-Honoré	
Hôtel Salomon de Rothschild	8	12 avenue de Friedland; 9, 11 rue Berryer; 193 rue du Faubourg-Saint-Honoré	
Hôtel Schneider	8	137 rue du Faubourg-Saint-Honoré	
Hôtel Sédille	8	28 boulevard Malesherbes	
Hôtel de La Vaupalière	8	25 avenue Matignon; 85 rue du Faubourg-Saint-Honoré	
Hôtel Vilgruy	8	9 rue François-Ier; 16 rue Jean-Goujon	
Hôtel particulier	8	33 rue Jean-Goujon	
Building	8	68 avenue des Champs-Élysées	
Building	8	70 avenue des Champs-Élysées	
Building	8	76-78 avenue des Champs-Élysées	
Building	8	79 avenue des Champs-Élysées	
Fouquet's	8	99 avenue des Champs-Élysées; Avenue George-V	
Buildings	8	116 bis avenue des Champs-Élysées; 1-5 rue Lord-Byron	
Building	8	5 rue du Docteur Lancereaux	
Building	8	4 rue de l'Élysée	
Building	8	12 bis, 14 rue de l'Élysée	
Building	8	1 rue du Faubourg-Saint-Honoré	
Building	8	118 rue du Faubourg-Saint-Honoré	
Building	8	120 rue du Faubourg-Saint-Honoré	
Immeuble de la Banque Transatlantique	8	26 avenue Franklin-D.-Roosevelt	
Building	8	30 avenue Franklin-D.-Roosevelt	
Building	8	38 avenue Gabriel	
Building	8	84 boulevard Malesherbes	
Building	8	86 boulevard Malesherbes	
Building	8	88 boulevard Malesherbes	
Building	8	90 boulevard Malesherbes	
Hôtel Talhouet	8	1 avenue de Marigny	
Building	8	51 rue de Miromesnil	
Building	8	126 rue de Provence	
Building	8	3 rue Royale	
Building	8	5 rue Royale	
Building	8	6 rue Royale	
Building	8	7 rue Royale	
Building	8	8 rue Royale	
Building	8	9 rue Royale	
Building	8	10 rue Royale	
Building	8	11 rue Royale	
Building	8	12 rue Royale	
Building	8	13 rue Royale	
Building	8	14 rue Royale	
Building	8	15 rue Royale	
Building	8	281 rue Saint-Honoré	
Building	8	16 rue de la Ville-l'Évêque	
Building	8	18 rue de la Ville-l'Évêque	
Hôtel Perrinet de Jars	8	33 rue du Faubourg-Saint-Honoré	
Élysée-Palace	8	103-111 avenue des Champs-Élysées; 39 rue de Bassano; 12, 14 rue Vernet; 62-66 rue Galilée	
Lavatory Madeleine	8	16 place de la Madeleine	
Lycée Chaptal	8	45 boulevard des Batignolles	
Aux Tortues	8	55 boulevard Haussmann; 35, 37 rue Tronchet	
Maison Courmont	8	28 rue de Liège	
Hôtel de la Marine	8	Place de la Concorde; 2 rue Royale	
Musée Jacquemart-André	8	158, 158 bis boulevard Haussmann	
Obélisque de Louxor	8	Place de la Concorde	
Pagode rouge	8	48 rue de Courcelles	
Palais de l'Élysée	8	55, 57 rue du Faubourg-Saint-Honoré	
Parc Monceau	8	Boulevard de Courcelles; Boulevard Malesherbes; Place de Rio-de-Janeiro	
Petit Palais	8	Avenue Winston-Churchill	
Place de la Concorde	8	Place de la Concorde	
La Fermette Marbeuf	8	3, 5 rue Marbeuf; 24 rue du Boccador	
Le Relais Plaza	8	21 avenue Montaigne	
Salle Gaveau	8	45, 47 rue La Boétie	
Salle Pleyel	8	252 rue du Faubourg-Saint-Honoré	
Temple du Saint-Esprit de Paris	8	5 rue Roquépine; 14 rue d'Astorg	
Théâtre des Champs-Élysées	8	13, 15 avenue Montaigne	
Théâtre de la Madeleine	8	19 rue de Surène	
Théâtre Marigny	8	Carré Marigny	
Théâtre des Mathurins	8	36, 38, 40 rue des Mathurins	
Théâtre du Rond-Point	8	2 bis avenue Franklin-D.-Roosevelt	
Théâtre Tristan-Bernard	8	64 rue du Rocher	
Bains Turcs	9	18 rue des Mathurins	
Casino de Paris	9	16 rue de Clichy	
Central téléphonique Provence	9	15-17 rue du Faubourg-Poissonnière; 2-12 rue Bergère; 2 rue du Conservatoire	
Bouillon Chartier	9	7 rue du Faubourg-Montmartre	
Cité d'Antin	9	57, 59, 61 rue de Provence; 1-7, 16, 18, 35, 37 cité d'Antin	
Cité Bergère	9	1-11, 2-18 cité Bergère; 21, 23 rue Bergère; 6 rue du Faubourg-Montmartre	
Cité Napoléon	9	58-60 bis rue de Rochechouart; 25 rue Pétrelle	
Cité de Trévise	9	5 rue Bleue; 14 rue Richer	
Comédie de Paris	9	42 rue Pierre-Fontaine; 51 boulevard de Clichy	
Comptoir national d'escompte de Paris	9	14-18 rue Bergère; 1-5 rue du Conservatoire; 5-9 rue Sainte-Cécile	
Confiserie Tanrade	9	18 rue Vignon	
Conservatoire national supérieur d'art dramatique	9	2 bis rue du Conservatoire	
Ancien couvent des Capucines	9	63, 65 rue de Caumartin	
Crèmerie	9	13 rue de Rougemont	
Édicule Guimard of the Cadet station	9	65 rue La Fayette; 17 rue Cadet	
Édicule Guimard of the Opéra station	9	Rue Auber; Rue Scribe	
Église de la Sainte-Trinité	9	Rue Morlot; Rue de la Trinité; Rue de Cheverus	
Église Notre-Dame-de-Lorette	9	Rue de Châteaudun; Rue Fléchier; Rue Bourdaloue; Rue Saint-Lazare	
Église Saint-Eugène-Sainte-Cécile	9	4 bis rue Sainte-Cécile; 4 rue du Conservatoire	
À la mère de famille	9	35 rue du Faubourg-Montmartre	
Foyer de l'Union chrétienne des Jeunes Gens de Paris	9	14 rue de Trévise	
Le Grand Hôtel InterContinental	9	12 boulevard des Capucines; 2, 4, 6 rue Scribe; 5 place de l'Opéra	
Hôtel d'Aumont	9	2, 2 bis rue de Caumartin; 30 boulevard des Capucines	
Hôtel Bélanger	9	13, 15 rue Saint-Georges	
Hôtel Le Duc de Biéville	9	10 rue de la Grange-Batelière	
Hôtel Blémont	9	5, 7 rue Ballu	
Hôtel Bony	9	32 rue de Trévise	
Hôtel de Choudens	9	21 rue Blanche	
Hôtel Cromot du Bourg	9	9, 11 rue Cadet; 60 rue La Fayette	
Hôtel de Mademoiselle Duchesnois	9	3 rue de la Tour-des-Dames	
Hôtel de Mademoiselle Mars	9	1 rue de la Tour-des-Dames; 7 rue de La Rochefoucauld	
Hôtel des Maréchaux	9	13, 15, 17 rue Richer	
Hôtel de Mercy-Argenteau	9	16 boulevard Montmartre	
Hôtel Moreau	9	20 rue de la Chaussée-d'Antin	
Hôtel Renan-Scheffer	9	16 rue Chaptal	
Hôtel Rousseau	9	66 rue de La Rochefoucauld	
Hôtel Talma	9	9 rue de la Tour-des-Dames	
Building	9	1 bis rue d'Athènes	
Building	9	3 bis rue d'Athènes	
Building	9	10 rue d'Aumale	
Building	9	26 rue Buffault	
Hôtel Judic	9	12 rue du Cardinal-Mercier	
Hôtel Marin-Delahaye	9	1, 3 rue de Caumartin; 2 boulevard de la Madeleine	
Building	9	2 bis rue de Caumartin	
Building	9	4 rue de Caumartin	
Building	9	6 rue de Caumartin	
Building	9	8 rue de Caumartin	
Building	9	10 rue de Caumartin	
Building	9	30 rue de Caumartin; 8 rue Boudreau	
Building	9	60 rue de Caumartin	
Building	9	71 rue de Caumartin	
Building	9	32 rue de Châteaudun; 29 rue Saint-Lazare	
Building	9	34 rue de Châteaudun; 27 rue Saint-Lazare	
Building	9	23 rue Chauchat; 42 rue La Fayette	
Building	9	2, 4 rue de la Chaussée-d'Antin; 38 boulevard des Italiens	
Building	9	6 rue de la Chaussée-d'Antin	
Building	9	8 rue de la Chaussée-d'Antin	
Building	9	68 rue de la Chaussée-d'Antin	
Building	9	11 cité Malesherbes	
Building	9	44 rue de Clichy	
Building	9	68 rue Condorcet	
Building	9	15 rue de Douai	
Building	9	22 rue de Douai; 26 rue Pierre-Fontaine; 34 rue Duperré; 1 rue Fromentin	
Building	9	2 place d'Estienne-d'Orves; 71 rue Saint-Lazare; 60 rue de Châteaudun	
Maison Trouard	9	9 rue du Faubourg-Poissonnière	
Building	9	53 rue du Faubourg-Poissonnière	
Building	9	1 avenue Frochot; 2 rue Frochot; 28 rue Victor-Massé	
Building	9	4 place Gustave-Toudouze	
Building	9	1 rue du Helder	
Building	9	3 rue du Helder	
Building	9	34 rue Henry-Monnier; 27 rue Victor-Massé	
Building	9	17 rue Joubert	
Building	9	20 rue Joubert; 98 bis rue de Provence	
Building	9	33 rue Joubert	
Building	9	33 rue Lamartine; 3 rue de Maubeuge	
Building	9	19 rue de La Rochefoucauld	
Building	9	17 rue de Londres	
Building	9	21 rue de Londres	
Building	9	10 rue des Martyrs	
Building	9	9 rue de Navarin	
Building	9	18 rue Notre-Dame-de-Lorette; 2 rue Laferrière	
Building	9	49 rue Notre-Dame-de-Lorette	
Building	9	50, 52 rue Notre-Dame-de-Lorette	
Building	9	7 rue Pierre-Fontaine	
Building	9	34 rue Jean-Baptiste-Pigalle	
Building	9	34 rue de Provence	
Building	9	92 rue de Provence	
Hôtel de Bernis	9	28 place Saint-Georges	
Building	9	1 rue Saint-Georges; 32 rue de Provence	
Building	9	4 rue Saint-Georges	
Building	9	8 rue Saint-Georges	
Building	9	27 rue Saint-Georges	
Building	9	30 rue Saint-Lazare	
Building	9	31 rue Saint-Lazare	
Building	9	58 rue Saint-Lazare	
Building	9	46 rue de la Victoire	
Building	9	9 rue Victor-Massé	
Building	9	25 rue Victor-Massé	
Building	9	21 bis, 23 rue Victor-Massé	
Immeuble de la Société générale	9	25, 27, 29, 31 boulevard Haussmann; 4, 6, 8 rue Gluck; 5 rue Halévy	
Buildings	9	16, 18, 22 rue de la Chaussée-d'Antin	
Buildings	9	40, 42, 44 rue de Provence	
Buildings	9	54, 56 rue de Provence	
Immeubles aux abords de l'église de la Sainte-Trinité	9	7, 8 place d'Estienne-d'Orves; 1, 3, 5, 7 rue Blanche; 2, 4, 6, 8 rue de Cheverus; 1, 3 rue de la Trinité; 1, 3, 5, 7 rue Morlot; 2, 4, 6, 8 rue de Clichy	
Immeubles aux abords de l'Opéra	9	2, 3, 5, 7 rue Auber; 1 rue Boudreau; 4, 6, 8 boulevard des Capucines; 3-13 rue de la Chaussée-d'Antin; 2-16 rue Halévy; 1 rue des Mathurins; 1, 2, 3, 4, 5, 7 rue Meyerbeer; 6, 11, 11 bis, 15, 17 rue Scribe; 7 place Charles-Garnier	
Immeubles situés square de l'Opéra-Louis-Jouvet	9	1, 3, 5, 6 square de l'Opéra-Louis-Jouvet; 5, 7, 9 rue Boudreau; 22, 24 rue de Caumartin	
Lycée Lamartine	9	121 rue du Faubourg-Poissonnière	
Town hall of Paris IXe arrondissement	9	6 rue Drouot	
Maison du miel	9	24 rue Vignon	
Musée Grévin	9	10 boulevard Montmartre	
Musée Gustave-Moreau	9	14 rue de La Rochefoucauld	
Opéra Garnier	9	Place de l'Opéra	
Le Palace	9	8 rue du Faubourg-Montmartre	
Passage Jouffroy	9	10, 12 boulevard Montmartre; 9 rue de la Grange-Batelière	
Passage Verdeau	9	6 rue de la Grange-Batelière; 31 bis, 33 rue du Faubourg-Montmartre	
Chez Jonathan	9	24 rue du Faubourg-Montmartre	
Printemps Haussmann	9	2 rue du Havre; 64-70 boulevard Haussmann; 115-127 rue de Provence	
Sous-station Opéra	9	41 rue de Caumartin	
Square d'Orléans	9	80 rue Taitbout	
Grande synagogue de Paris	9	44 rue de la Victoire	
Temple de la Rédemption	9	16 rue Chauchat	
Théâtre de l'Athénée-Louis-Jouvet	9	24 rue de Caumartin; 4 square de l'Opéra-Louis-Jouvet	
Théâtre Édouard VII	9	1-7, 2-10 place Édouard-VII; 16-22 boulevard des Capucines	
Folies Bergère	9	32 rue Richer	
Théâtre Mogador	9	Rue de Mogador	
Théâtre de l'Olympia	9	28 boulevard des Capucines; 8 rue de Caumartin	
Théâtre de Paris	9	15 rue Blanche	
Butcher shop	10	2 rue Perdonnet; 24 rue Cail	
Canal Saint-Martin	10	Quai de Jemmapes; Quai de Valmy	
Couvent des Récollets	10	8 rue des Récollets	
À l'enseigne du lion d'or	10	19 rue Jean-Poulmarch	
Ancien débit de boisson	10	80 rue du Faubourg-Poissonnière; 24 rue des Messageries	
Édicule Guimard of the Château d'Eau station	10	49-51 boulevard de Strasbourg	
Édicule Guimard of the Colonel Fabien station	10	Place du Colonel-Fabien	
Édicule Guimard of the Gare du Nord station	10	2 boulevard de Denain; 129 rue La Fayette	
Édicule Guimard of the Gare du Nord station	10	9 boulevard de Denain	
Édicule Guimard of the Gare du Nord station	10	12 boulevard de Denain	
Édicule Guimard of the Louis Blanc station	10	221 rue La Fayette; 223 rue du Faubourg-Saint-Martin	
Édicule Guimard of the République station	10	Place de la République	
Église Saint-Laurent	10	68 boulevard de Magenta	
Église Saint-Vincent-de-Paul	10	5 rue de Belzunce	
Eldorado	10	4 boulevard de Strasbourg; 11 rue du Faubourg-Saint-Martin	
Fontaine Saint-Laurent	10	Jardin Villemin	
Gare de l'Est	10	Place du 11-Novembre-1918	
Gare du Nord	10	112 rue de Maubeuge	
Hôpital Lariboisière	10	2 rue Ambroise-Paré	
Hôpital Saint-Louis	10	40-42 rue Bichat; 12 rue de la Grange-aux-Belles; 19 rue Alibert; 1 avenue Claude-Vellefaux; 2 place du Docteur-Alfred-Fournier	
Hôtel Botterel de Quintin	10	44 rue des Petites-Écuries	
Hôtel Bourrienne	10	58 rue d'Hauteville	
Hôtel Chéret	10	30 rue du Faubourg-Poissonnière	
Hôtel Gouthière	10	6 rue Pierre-Bullet	
Hôtel Leblanc-Barbedienne	10	63 rue de Lancry	
Hôtel Bertin	10	26 rue d'Hauteville	
Hôtel de Raguse	10	51 rue de Paradis	
Hôtel de Rosambo	10	62-64 rue René-Boulanger	
Hôtel de Sechtré	10	66 rue René-Boulanger	
Hôtel Titon	10	58 rue du Faubourg-Poissonnière	
Building	10	14 rue d'Abbeville	
Building	10	99 rue du Faubourg-Saint-Denis	
Building	10	101 rue du Faubourg-Saint-Denis	
Building	10	103 rue du Faubourg-Saint-Denis	
Building	10	105 rue du Faubourg-Saint-Denis	
Building	10	234 rue du Faubourg-Saint-Martin	
Building	10	1 place Franz-Liszt; 91 rue d'Hauteville	
Building	10	2 place Franz-Liszt; 100 rue d'Hauteville	
Building	10	3 place Franz-Liszt; 108 rue La Fayette	
Building	10	4 place Franz-Liszt; 29 rue des Petits-Hôtels	
Building	10	5 place Franz-Liszt; 107 rue La Fayette	
Building	10	7 place Franz-Liszt; 1 rue d'Abbeville	
Le Louxor	10	170 boulevard de Magenta; Boulevard de la Chapelle	
Anciens magasins Boulenger	10	18 rue de Paradis	
House	10	29 rue de Paradis	
Palais du Commerce	10	105 rue du Faubourg-du-Temple	
Passage Brady	10	33-33 bis boulevard de Strasbourg; 46 rue du Faubourg-Saint-Denis	
Porte Saint-Denis	10	Rue du Faubourg-Saint-Denis; Boulevard de Bonne-Nouvelle; Boulevard Saint-Denis	
Porte Saint-Martin	10	Rue du Faubourg-Saint-Martin; Boulevard Saint-Denis; Boulevard Saint-Martin	
Prison Saint-Lazare	10	107 rue du Faubourg-Saint-Denis; 1-5 square Alban-Satragne	
Réservoir de l'hôpital Saint-Louis	10	7 rue Juliette-Dodu	
Bouillon Julien	10	16 rue du Faubourg-Saint-Denis	
Sous-station Temple	10	36 rue Jacques-Louvel-Tessier	
Théâtre Antoine	10	14 boulevard de Strasbourg	
Théâtre de la Porte-Saint-Martin	10	16 boulevard Saint-Martin	
Théâtre de la Renaissance	10	20 boulevard Saint-Martin; 19 rue René-Boulanger	
Théâtre des Bouffes du Nord	10	37 bis boulevard de la Chapelle	
Théâtre du Gymnase	10	38 boulevard de Bonne-Nouvelle	
Usine électrique	10	132-134 quai de Jemmapes	
Barrière du Trône	11	Place de la Nation	
Bakery	11	45 rue Popincourt	
Bakery	11	153 rue de la Roquette; 41 rue de la Folie-Regnault	
Boulangerie-pâtisserie Beaumarchais	11	28 boulevard Beaumarchais	
Le Bistrot du Peintre	11	116 avenue Ledru-Rollin	
Bataclan	11	50, 52 boulevard Voltaire	
Canal Saint-Martin	11		
Charcuterie	11	75 rue Amelot	
Cirque d'Hiver	11	110 rue Amelot	
Clown-Bar	11	114 rue Amelot	
Cour de l'Étoile-d'Or	11	75 rue du Faubourg-Saint-Antoine	
Cour de l'Industrie	11	37 bis rue de Montreuil	
Couvent des Bénédictines du Bon-Secours	11	99, 101 rue de Charonne; Impasse Bon-Secours	
Couvent de la Madeleine de Traisnel	11	100 rue de Charonne	
Édicule Guimard of the Bréguet-Sabin station	11	23 boulevard Richard-Lenoir	
Édicule Guimard of the Couronnes station	11	Boulevard de Belleville	
Édicule Guimard of the Ménilmontant station	11	Boulevard de Ménilmontant	
Édicule Guimard of the Parmentier station	11	88 bis avenue Parmentier	
Édicule Guimard of the Père Lachaise station	11	Boulevard de Ménilmontant	
Édicule Guimard of the Richard-Lenoir station	11	65 boulevard Richard-Lenoir	
Édicule Guimard of the Rue Saint-Maur station	11	74 avenue de la République	
Église du Bon-Secours	11	20 rue Titon	
Église Saint-Ambroise	11	71 boulevard Voltaire	
Église Sainte-Marguerite	11	36 rue Saint-Bernard	
Housing complex	11	5 cité de la Roquette	
Faïencerie Loebnitz	11	4 rue de la Pierre-Levée	
Fontaine de Charonne	11	61 rue du Faubourg-Saint-Antoine; 1 rue de Charonne	
Fontaine de Montreuil	11	Rue du Faubourg-Saint-Antoine	
Fontaine de la Roquette	11	70 rue de la Roquette	
Hôtel de Mortagne	11	51, 53 rue de Charonne	
Hôtel de l'abbé Dumoncais	11	136, 138 rue Amelot; 7 rue Jean-Pierre-Timbaud	
Building	11	14 place de la Bastille; 2, 4 boulevard Richard-Lenoir	
Building	11	7 avenue de la République	
Building	11	57 boulevard Richard-Lenoir	
Buildings	11	31-39 rue du Faubourg-Saint-Antoine	
Buildings	11	2-16, 1-17 rue des Immeubles-Industriels; 76 rue de Montreuil; 262-266 boulevard Voltaire; 307, 309 rue du Faubourg-Saint-Antoine	
House	11	78 rue de Charonne; 43 rue Saint-Bernard	
House	11	71 rue de la Roquette	
House	11	12 rue Saint-Bernard	
Maison des Métallos	11	94 rue Jean-Pierre-Timbaud	
Palais de la Femme	11	94 rue de Charonne	
Pension Belhomme	11	161 rue de Charonne	
Restaurant Le Chardenoux	11	1 rue Jules-Vallès	
Barrière du Trône	12	Place de la Nation	
Bastion n^{o} 1	12	117 bis boulevard Poniatowski	
Bakery	12	2 rue Émilio-Castelar; 85 bis rue de Charenton	
Bakery	12	19 rue Montgallet	
Caserne des Mousquetaires Noirs	12	Hôpital des Quinze-Vingts, 26 rue de Charenton	
Charcuterie	12	4 bis rue Parrot	
Château de Vincennes	12	Bois de Vincennes and Vincennes	
Cimetière de Picpus	12	35 rue de Picpus	
Colonne de Juillet	12	Place de la Bastille	
École Saint-Michel de Picpus	12	41 boulevard de Picpus	
Édicule Guimard of the Bastille station	12	Rue de Lyon	
Édicule Guimard of the Daumesnil station	12	Place Félix-Éboué	
Édicule Guimard of the Gare de Lyon station	12	Boulevard Diderot	
Édicule Guimard of the Nation station	12	Place de la Nation	
Édicule Guimard of the Nation station	12	Place de la Nation	
Édicule Guimard of the Picpus station	12	Avenue de Saint-Mandé	
Église du Saint-Esprit	12	186 avenue Daumesnil	
Église Notre-Dame-de-la-Nativité de Bercy	12	Place Lachambeaudie	
Entrepôts de Bercy	12		
Fondation Eugène-Napoléon	12	254 rue du Faubourg-Saint-Antoine	
Gare de Lyon	12	20 boulevard Diderot; 196, 202-210 rue de Bercy; 19 rue de Chalon	
Hôpital Saint-Antoine	12	184 rue du Faubourg-Saint-Antoine	
Hospice Saint-Michel	12	35 avenue Courteline	
Institut international bouddhique	12	Bois de Vincennes, 40 route de ceinture du Lac-Daumesnil	
Jardin tropical de Paris	12	Bois de Vincennes	
Lavoir du marché Lenoir	12	7, 9 rue de Cotte	
Magasin de meubles Gouffé	12	46, 48 rue du Faubourg-Saint-Antoine	
Marché Beauvau	12	Place d'Aligre	
Palais de la Porte Dorée	12	293 avenue Daumesnil	
Pavillon de l'ancienne douane	12	139 rue de Bercy	
Pavillon de la barrière d'eau	12	10 quai de la Rapée	
Pavillon de chasse du duc de Guise	12	99 bis, 101 rue de Reuilly	
Pyramide	12	Bois de Vincennes, route de la Pyramide	
Le Train bleu	12	Gare de Lyon	
Viaduc d'Austerlitz	12		
Bakery	13	34 avenue de Choisy	
Carrières des Capucins	13	Boulevard de Port-Royal	
Cité fleurie	13	61-67 boulevard Arago	
Cité-refuge de l'Armée du Salut	13	12 rue Cantagrel	
Édicule Guimard of the Campo-Formio station	13	Boulevard de l'Hôpital	
Édicule Guimard of the Place d'Italie station	13	Place d'Italie	
Édicule Guimard of the Place d'Italie station	13	Place d'Italie	
Édicule Guimard of the Saint-Marcel station	13	Boulevard de l'Hôpital	
Gare d'Austerlitz	13	1-11 bis and 19-27 boulevard de l'Hôpital; 1-3 place Valhubert	
Groupe scolaire	13	10 rue Küss	
Halle Freyssinet	13	55 boulevard Vincent-Auriol	
Hôpital de la Pitié-Salpêtrière	13	47 boulevard de l'Hôpital	
Îlot de la Reine Blanche	13	12 to 18 rue Berbier-du-Mets; 17-19 rue des Gobelins; 4 to 10 rue Gustave-Geffroy	
House	13	3 rue des Gobelins	
Maison Planeix	13	24 bis to 26 bis boulevard Masséna	
Manufacture des Gobelins	13	42 avenue des Gobelins; 6, 8, 10 rue Berbier-du-Mets; 2 rue Croulebarbe	
Mobilier national	13	1 rue Berbier-du-Mets	
Pavillon Jean de Julienne	13	20 rue Le Brun	
Piscine de la Butte-aux-Cailles	13	5, 7 place Paul-Verlaine; 49 bis rue Bobillot; 50, 52 rue du Moulinet; 38 rue du Moulin-des-Prés	
Siège du Droit humain international	13	5 rue Jules Breton	
Square René-Le Gall	13	Rue Corvisart; Rue Croulebarbe	
Théâtre des Gobelins	13	73 avenue des Gobelins	
Tour Albert	13	33 rue Croulebarbe	
Usine de la Société Urbaine d'Air Comprimé	13	3 to 13 quai Panhard-et-Levassor	
Abbaye de Port-Royal	14	121, 125 boulevard de Port-Royal	
Bains d'Odessa	14	5, 5 bis rue d'Odessa	
Barrière d'Enfer	14	1, 2 place Denfert-Rochereau	
Le Moulin de la Vierge	14	105 rue Vercingétorix	
Bakery	14	155 rue d'Alésia; Rue Furtado-Heine	
Bakery	14	45 rue Raymond-Losserand; Rue du Château	
Carrière de Port-Mahon	14	13-17 villa Saint-Jacques; 22-32 Rue de la Tombe-Issoire	
Chapelle Saint-Yves	14	Cité du Souvenir; 11 rue Saint-Yves	
Collège néerlandais	14	61 boulevard Jourdan, Cité universitaire	
La Coupole	14	102 boulevard du Montparnasse	
Couvent Saint-François	14	7 rue Marie-Rose	
Édicule Guimard of the Denfert-Rochereau station	14	Place Denfert-Rochereau	
Édicule Guimard of the Mouton-Duvernet station	14	Avenue du Général-Leclerc	
Édicule Guimard of the Raspail station	14	Boulevard Raspail; Boulevard Edgar-Quinet	
Église Notre-Dame-du-Travail	14	59 rue Vercingétorix	
Église Saint-Pierre-de-Montrouge	14	82 avenue du Général-Leclerc; 205 avenue du Maine; Place Victor-et-Hélène-Basch	
Fondation Avicenne	14	17 boulevard Jourdan, Cité universitaire	
Fondation Deutsch de la Meurthe	14	37 boulevard Jourdan, Cité universitaire	
Fondation des États-Unis	14	15 boulevard Jourdan, Cité universitaire	
Gare de Denfert-Rochereau	14	3 place Denfert-Rochereau; 2 rue Hallé; 1-9 avenue René-Coty; 71-83 boulevard Saint-Jacques; Rue de la Tombe-Issoire	
Hôpital Cochin	14	111 boulevard de Port-Royal; 7 rue du Faubourg-Saint-Jacques	
Hôpital La Rochefoucauld	14	15 avenue du Général-Leclerc; 8 bis, 8 ter avenue René-Coty	
Hôpital Sainte-Anne	14	1 rue Cabanis	
Hôtel de Massa	14	38 rue du Faubourg-Saint-Jacques	
Building	14	108 rue d'Alésia; 40 rue des Plantes	
Building	14	31, 31 bis rue Campagne-Première; Passage d'Enfer	
Building	14	12 rue Cassini	
Building	14	3 rue de la Cité-Universitaire	
Building	14	21 rue Gazan	
Building	14	7 rue Lebouis; 2 Impasse Lebouis	
Building	14	7 rue Méchain	
Building	14	5 rue Victor-Schoelcher	
Building	14	11, 11 bis rue Victor-Schoelcher; 12 rue Victor-Considérant	
Immeuble Studio Hôtel	14	9 rue Delambre	
Immeuble Studio Raspail	14	216 boulevard Raspail	
Kiosque de Chateaubriand	14	75, 77 avenue Denfert-Rochereau	
Bookstore	14	10 bis rue Roger	
Lion de Belfort	14	Place Denfert-Rochereau	
Mairie annexe du XIVe arrondissement	14	26 rue Mouton-Duvernet	
Maison du Brésil	14	7 boulevard Jourdan, Cité universitaire	
Hôtel Fontaine	14	83 avenue Denfert-Rochereau	
Maison Guggenbuhl	14	16 rue Nansouty; 2 rue Georges-Braque	
Maison Ozenfant	14	53 avenue Reille	
Mire du Sud	14	Parc Montsouris	
Moulin de la Charité	14	Cimetière du Montparnasse	
Observatoire de Paris	14	61 avenue de l'Observatoire	
Pavillon des Fontainiers	14	42, 44 avenue de l'Observatoire; 65 avenue Denfert-Rochereau; 15-19 rue Cassini	
Pavillon de la Suisse	14	7 boulevard Jourdan, Cité universitaire	
Regard de l'aqueduc Médicis	14	75, 77 avenue Denfert-Rochereau	
Relais de poste de la Barrière d'Enfer	14	75, 77 avenue Denfert-Rochereau	
Théâtre de la Gaîté-Montparnasse	14	24, 26 rue de la Gaîté; 67 avenue du Maine	
Théâtre Montparnasse	14	31 rue de la Gaîté	
Grave of Tania Rachevskaïa	14	Cimetière du Montparnasse	
Villa Seurat	14	1, 3, 4, 5, 7 bis, 8, 9, 11 villa Seurat; 101 rue de la Tombe-Issoire	
Aviatic Bar	15	354 bis rue de Vaugirard	
Butcher shop	15	4 rue d'Alleray	
Butcher shop	15	178 rue de la Convention	
Bakery	15	108 rue Blomet	
Bakery	15	70 bis rue Dutot	
Bakery	15	24 rue du Commerce	
Le Relais du métro	15	3 boulevard de Grenelle	
Caisse d'allocations familiales de Paris	15	10-26 rue Viala; 5 bis to 11 rue Saint-Charles; 36-44 rue du Docteur-Finlay	
Collège de l'Immaculée Conception	15	391 rue de Vaugirard; 1 rue Lacretelle	
Crèmerie	15	10 rue Lecourbe	
Crèmerie	15	124 rue Saint-Charles	
Édicule Guimard of the Pasteur station	15	Boulevard Pasteur	
Église Saint-Christophe-de-Javel	15	28 rue de la Convention	
Hôpital Necker-Enfants malades	15	149-151 rue de Sèvres	
Building	15	6-10 rue de la Cavalerie	
Building	15	19 avenue du Maine	
Maison et atelier du maître-verrier Barillet	15	15 square Vergennes	
Building	15	3 boulevard Victor; Rue Lecourbe	
Institut Pasteur	15	25, 28 rue du Docteur-Roux	
Laboratoire de la Marine	15	8 boulevard du Général-Martial-Valin	
Lycée Camille-Sée	15	11 rue Léon-Lhermitte	
Town hall of Paris XVe arrondissement	15	31 rue Péclet	
Mairie de Grenelle	15	1 place du Commerce; 69 rue Violet	
Pavillon Violet	15	6 place Violet	
Pont de Bir-Hakeim	15		
Pont Mirabeau	15		
La Ruche	15	2 passage de Dantzig	
Square Saint-Lambert	15	1-7 square Saint-Lambert	
Peruvian Embassy	16	50 avenue Kléber; 2 rue Paul-Valéry	
Atelier du ferronnier Brandt	16	101 boulevard Murat	
Boucherie Lamartine	16	172 Avenue Victor-Hugo	
Bakery	16	53 rue de la Tour	
Café-Bar	16	5 rue Mesnil	
Centre de secours Dauphine	16	8 rue Mesnil	
Castel Béranger	16	12, 14 rue Jean-de-La-Fontaine; Hameau Béranger	
Cinéma Ranelagh	16	5 rue des Vignes	
Lycée Saint-Louis-de-Gonzague	16	12 rue Benjamin-Franklin	
Crèmerie	16	169 rue de la Pompe	
Crèmerie	16	28 rue des Sablons	
Lycée Jean-Baptiste-Say	16	11 bis rue d'Auteuil	
École du Sacré-Cœur	16	11 avenue de la Frillière	
Édicule Guimard of the Boissière station	16	Avenue Kléber	
Édicule Guimard of the Chardon-Lagache station	16	Rue Molitor; Rue Chardon-Lagache	
Édicule Guimard of the Église-d'Auteuil station	16	Rue d'Auteuil ue Chardon-Lagache	
Édicule Guimard of the Kléber station	16	Avenue Kléber	
Édicule Guimard of the Mirabeau station	16	Rue Mirabeau	
Édicule Guimard of the Porte d'Auteuil station	16	Boulevard de Montmorency	
Édicule Guimard of the Porte Dauphine station	16	Avenue Foch; Avenue Bugeaud	
Édicule Guimard of the Victor-Hugo station	16	Place Victor-Hugo; Avenue Victor-Hugo; Rue Léonard-de-Vinci	
Église orthodoxe grecque	16	5, 7 rue Georges-Bizet	
Saint James Paris (former Fondation Thiers)	16	5 place du Chancelier-Adenauer	
Hôtel particulier	16	16 rue de la Faisanderie	
Hôtel particulier	16	5 place d'Iéna	
Hôtel Roland Bonaparte	16	10 avenue d'Iéna; 10 rue Fresnel	
Hôtel Guadet	16	95 boulevard Murat	
Hôtel Guimard	16	122 avenue Mozart	
Hôtel Jassedé	16	41 rue Chardon-Lagache	
Hôtel Le Vavasseur	16	21 rue Boissière	
Hôtel Mezzara	16	60 rue Jean-de-La-Fontaine	
Hôtel de Monpelas	16	19 avenue Foch	
Hôtel Pauilhac	16	59 avenue Raymond-Poincaré	
Hôtel Véron	16	16, 18 rue d'Auteuil	
Bibliothèque Octavio Paz	16	11 avenue Marceau	
Building	16	17 rue Benjamin-Franklin; 1 rue Scheffer	
Building	16	25 bis rue Benjamin-Franklin	
Building	16	27 avenue Georges-Mandel	
Studio Building	16	65 rue Jean-de-La-Fontaine	
Immeubles formant la rue Mallet-Stevens	16	1 bis, 3, 4, 5, 6, 7, 10, 12 rue Mallet-Stevens; 9 rue du Docteur-Blanche	
Building	16	25 rue de la Pompe	
Building	16	51-55 rue Raynouard; 38 rue Berton	
Building	16	25 avenue de Versailles	
Building	16	3 ter, 6 villa de Beauséjour; 11 bis boulevard de Beauséjour	
Immeubles Agar	16	43 rue Gros; 17-21 rue Jean-de-La-Fontaine; 8, 10 rue Agar	
Immeuble Les Chardons	16	9 rue Claude-Chahu; 2 rue Eugène-Manuel	
Immeuble Jassédé	16	142 avenue de Versailles; 1 rue Lancret	
Immeuble Molitor	16	24 rue Nungesser et Coli; 23 rue de la Tourelle	
Immeubles Walter	16	2-10 boulevard Suchet; 1-9 avenue du Maréchal-Maunoury; 2-4 rue Ernest-Hébert; 1-3 place de Colombie	
Jardin des serres d'Auteuil	16	3 avenue de la Porte-d'Auteuil; Boulevard d'Auteuil; Avenue du Général-Sarrail; Avenue Gordon-Bennett	
Laboratoire Aerodynamique Eiffel	16	67 rue Boileau; 22 rue de Musset	
Maison-atelier des sculpteurs Martel	16	10 rue Mallet-Stevens	
Monument d'Aguesseau	16	Place de l'Église-d'Auteuil	
Maison de Balzac	16	24 rue Berton; Rue Raynouard	
Musée Clemenceau	16	8 rue Benjamin-Franklin	
Musée d'Ennery	16	59 avenue Foch	
Musée Guimet	16	6 place d'Iéna	
Palais de Chaillot	16	Place du Trocadéro-et-du-11-Novembre; Avenue du Président-Wilson; Avenue Albert-de-Mun; Rue Benjamin-Franklin	
Palais d'Iéna	16	1 avenue d'Iéna; Place d'Iéna	
Pavillon	16	12 avenue des Tilleuls; Rue Pierre-Guérin	
Château de Bagatelle	16	Bois de Boulogne	
Piscine Molitor	16	1-5 boulevard d'Auteuil; Rue Nungesser-et-Coli; 2-14 avenue de la Porte-Molitor	
Restaurant Prunier	16	16 Avenue Victor-Hugo; 1 rue de Traktir	
Sous-station Auteuil	16	2 bis rue Michel-Ange	
Villa Jeanneret-Raaf	16	8 square du Docteur-Blanche; 55 rue du Docteur-Blanche	
Villa La Roche	16	10 square du Docteur-Blanche; 55 rue du Docteur-Blanche	
Ateliers Berthier	17	32 boulevard Berthier	
Château des Ternes	17	17, 19 rue Pierre-Demours; 28 rue Bayen	
Crèmerie	17	10 rue Gustave-Flaubert	
École normale de musique de Paris	17	76, 78 rue Cardinet; 114 bis boulevard Malesherbes	
Édicule Guimard of the Monceau station	17	Boulevard de Courcelles	
Édicule Guimard of the Rome station	17	Boulevard des Batignolles	
Édicule Guimard of the Ternes station	17	Place des Ternes	
Édicule Guimard of the Villiers station	17	Boulevard de Courcelles	
Édicule Guimard of the Wagram station	17	Rue Brémontier; Avenue de Villiers	
Église Notre-Dame-de-Compassion	17	Avenue de la Porte-des-Ternes; Boulevard d'Aurelle-de-Paladines	
Église Sainte-Marie-des-Batignolles	17	Place du Docteur-Félix-Lobligeois	
Église Sainte-Odile	17	2, 2A avenue Stéphane-Mallarmé	
Hôtel de Gunsburg	17	7 rue de Tilsitt; 2 avenue Mac-Mahon	
Hôtel Gaillard	17	1 place du Général-Catroux	
Hôtel particulier	17	68 rue Ampère	
Hôtel Gourron	17	23 ter boulevard Berthier	
Lycée professionnel d'esthétique et haute-couture	17	9 rue Fortuny	
Building	17	62-64 rue Boursault	
Building	17	8 avenue de Verzy	
Salle Wagram	17	39, 41 avenue de Wagram; 5 rue de Montenotte	
Théâtre Hébertot	17	78 bis Boulevard des Batignolles	
Usine électrique de la place Clichy	17	53 rue des Dames	
Bateau-Lavoir	18	13, 13 bis place Émile-Goudeau	
Bakery	18	48 rue Caulaincourt	
Bakery	18	128 rue Lamarck	
Bakery	18	159 rue Ordener; Rue Montcalm	
La Cigale	18	120 boulevard de Rochechouart	
Cimetière de Montmartre	18	20 avenue Rachel	
Édicule Guimard of the Abbesses station	18	Place des Abbesses	
Édicule Guimard of the Anvers station	18	70 boulevard de Rochechouart	
Édicule Guimard of the Barbès - Rochechouart station	18	Boulevard de Rochechouart	
Édicule Guimard of the Blanche station	18	Boulevard de Clichy	
Édicule Guimard of the Pigalle station	18	16 boulevard de Clichy	
Édicule Guimard of the Place de Clichy station	18	130 boulevard de Clichy; Place de Clichy	
Église Saint-Bernard de la Chapelle	18	6 bis rue Saint-Luc	
Église Saint-Jean-de-Montmartre	18	19 rue des Abbesses	
Église Saint-Pierre de Montmartre	18	2 rue du Mont-Cenis	
Élysée Montmartre	18	72, 74, 76 boulevard de Rochechouart; 1, 3 rue de Steinkerque	
Hôtel Lejeune	18	28 avenue Junot; 22 rue Simon-Dereure	
Building	18	43 bis rue Damrémont	
Building	18	7 rue de Trétaigne	
Piscine des Amiraux	18	13 rue des Amiraux; 4, 6 rue Hermann-Lachapelle	
Maison Eymonaud	18	7 impasse Marie-Blanche	
Maison Tristan Tzara	18	15 avenue Junot	
Manufacture de porcelaine de Clignancourt	18	61, 63 rue du Mont-Cenis; 103 rue Marcadet	
Marché de La Chapelle	18	8 rue de la Guadeloupe	
Mire du Nord	18	1 rue Girardon	
Moulin de la Galette	18	77 rue Lepic	
Le Pigalle	18	22 boulevard de Clichy	
Théâtre de l'Atelier	18	1 place Charles-Dullin; 45 rue d'Orsel	
Théâtre des Deux Ânes	18	100 boulevard de Clichy	
Le Trianon	18	88 boulevard de Rochechouart	
Villa des Arts	18	15, 15 bis rue Hégésippe-Moreau	
Bakery	19	83 rue de Crimée	
Bakery	19	114 avenue de Flandre	
Cimetière des Juifs Portugais	19	44 avenue de Flandre	
Eaux de Belleville	19	Belleville	
Édicule Guimard of the Botzaris station	19	Rue Botzaris	
Édicule Guimard of the Crimée station	19	185 rue de Crimée; 2 rue Mathis	
Édicule Guimard of the Jaurès station	19	Boulevard de la Villette	
Édicule Guimard of the Pré Saint-Gervais station	19	Boulevard Sérurier; Rue Alphonse-Aulard	
Fontaine aux Lions	19	Place de la Fontaine-aux-Lions	
Garde-meuble Odoul	19	8 Passage de l'Atlas	
Grande halle de La Villette	19	Parc de la Villette	
Gymnase Jean-Jaurès	19	87, 89 avenue Jean-Jaurès	
Building	19	152 avenue de Flandre	
Halle Secrétan	19	32 avenue Secrétan	
Pavillon de la Bourse	19	Parc de la Villette	
Pavillon Janvier	19	Parc de la Villette	
Piscine Pailleron	19	30 rue Édouard-Pailleron	
Pont levant de la rue de Crimée	19	Rue de Crimée	
Regard du Bernage	19	Avenue du Belvédère	
Regard du Chaudron	19	6 rue de Palestine	
Regard de la Lanterne	19	3 rue Augustin-Thierry; 213 rue de Belleville	
Regard Lecouteux	19	44 rue des Solitaires	
Regard des Maussins	19	Boulevard Sérurier	
Regard Saint-Louis	19	169 rue de Belleville	
Rotonde de la Villette	19	Place de la Bataille-de-Stalingrad; Boulevard de la Villette	
Service municipal des Pompes Funèbres	19	108 rue d'Aubervilliers; 5 rue Curial	
Headquarters of the French Communist Party	19	2 place du Colonel-Fabien	
Usine élévatrice des eaux	19	Parc de la Villette	
Bakery	20	43 rue des Envierges; 71 rue de la Mare	
Chapelle du Père-Lachaise	20	Cimetière du Père-Lachaise	
Charcuterie	20	108 rue de Bagnolet	
Cimetière de Charonne	20	Boulevard de Charonne	
Cimetière du Père-Lachaise	20	Cimetière du Père-Lachaise	
Columbarium of Père-Lachaise	20	Cimetière du Père-Lachaise	
Crematorium of Père-Lachaise	20	Cimetière du Père-Lachaise	
Eaux de Belleville	20	Belleville	
Édicule Guimard of the Alexandre Dumas station	20	Boulevard de Charonne	
Édicule Guimard of the Avron station	20	Boulevard de Charonne	
Édicule Guimard of the Gambetta station	20	Place Martin-Nadaud	
Édicule Guimard of the Philippe Auguste station	20	Boulevard de Charonne	
Église Saint-Germain de Charonne	20	4 place Saint-Blaise	
Église Saint-Jean-Bosco	20	77, 79 rue Alexandre-Dumas	
Hospice Debrousse	20	146, 148 rue de Bagnolet	
Tomb of Abelard and Heloise	20	Cimetière du Père-Lachaise	
Monument de Landry	20	Cimetière du Père-Lachaise	
Grave of Molière and La Fontaine	20	Cimetière du Père-Lachaise	
Monument de Montanier	20	Cimetière du Père-Lachaise	
Monument aux morts du Père-Lachaise	20	Cimetière du Père-Lachaise	
Grave of Oscar Wilde	20	Cimetière du Père-Lachaise	
Mur des Fédérés	20	Cimetière du Père-Lachaise	
Pavillon Pompadour	20	121 rue de Ménilmontant	
Main gate of the Cemetery Père-Lachaise	20	Cimetière du Père-Lachaise	
Regard des Messiers	20	17 rue des Cascades	
Regard des Petites-Rigoles	20	43 rue de l'Ermitage	
Regard de la Roquette	20	38 rue de la Mare	
Regard Saint-Martin	20	42 rue des Cascades	
Regard des Cascades	20	84-91 rue des Cascades; Place Henri-Krasucki	
Grave of François Bègue	20	Cimetière de Charonne	
Grave of Pierre Cartellier	20	Cimetière du Père-Lachaise	
Grave of Frederic Chopin	20	Cimetière du Père-Lachaise	
Grave of Georges Guët	20	Cimetière du Père-Lachaise	

== See also ==
- List of hôtels particuliers in Paris
- List of Parisian structures commissioned by Napoleon I
