= Rue de la Sourdière =

Street in Paris, France

Coordinates: 48.8667°N 2.3328°E

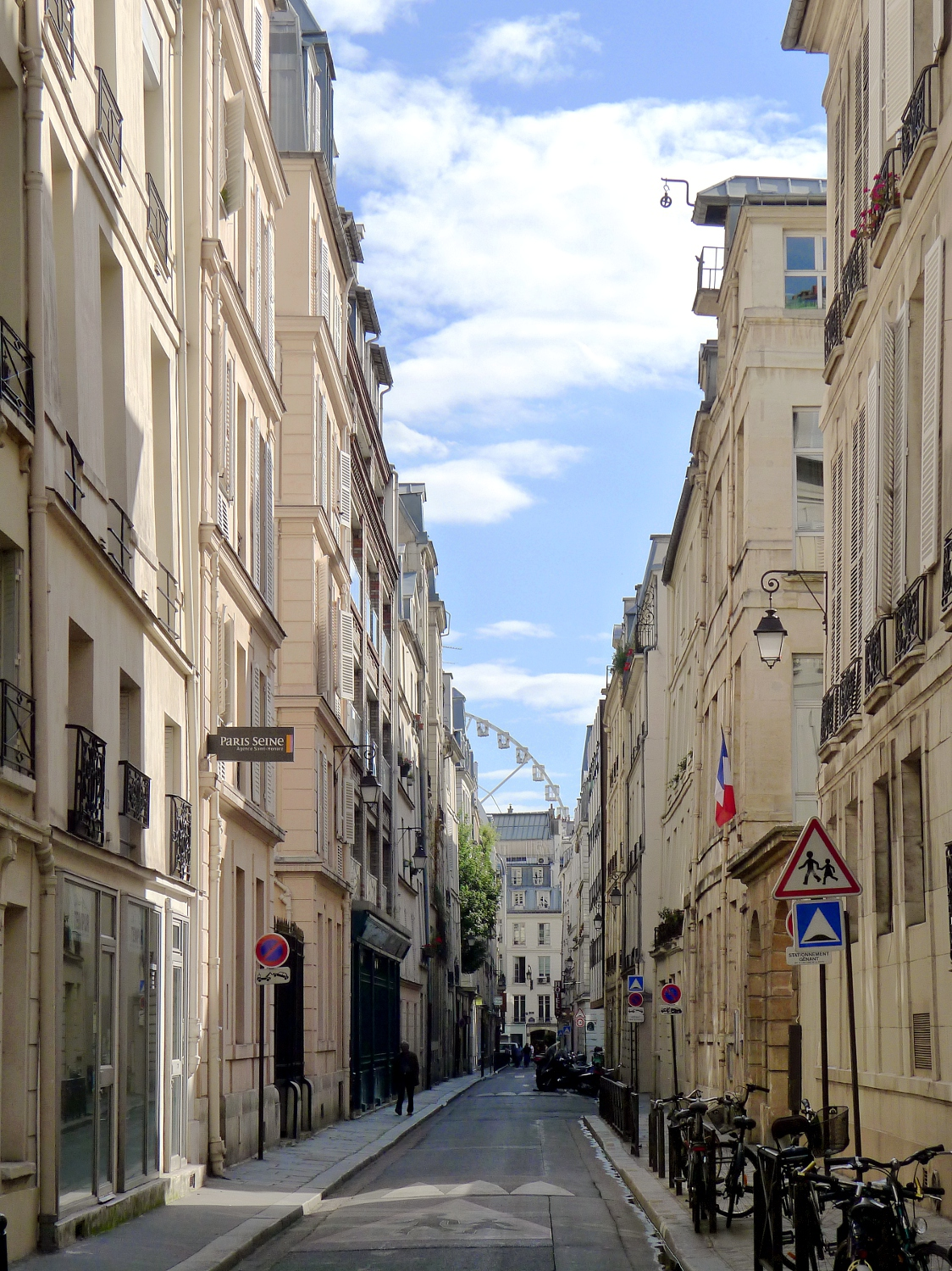
Rue de La Sourdière

The Rue de La Sourdière (French pronunciation: [ʁy də la suʁdjɛʁ]) is a street in the 1st arrondissement of Paris, France.

During the French Revolution, Maximilien de Robespierre survived a riot by entering the Church of Saint Roch (located in the Rue Saint-Honoré) and taking a tunnel to 10 rue de la Sourdière.
