= Rue de Charenton =

Street in Paris, France

Coordinates: 48.8522°N 2.3714°E

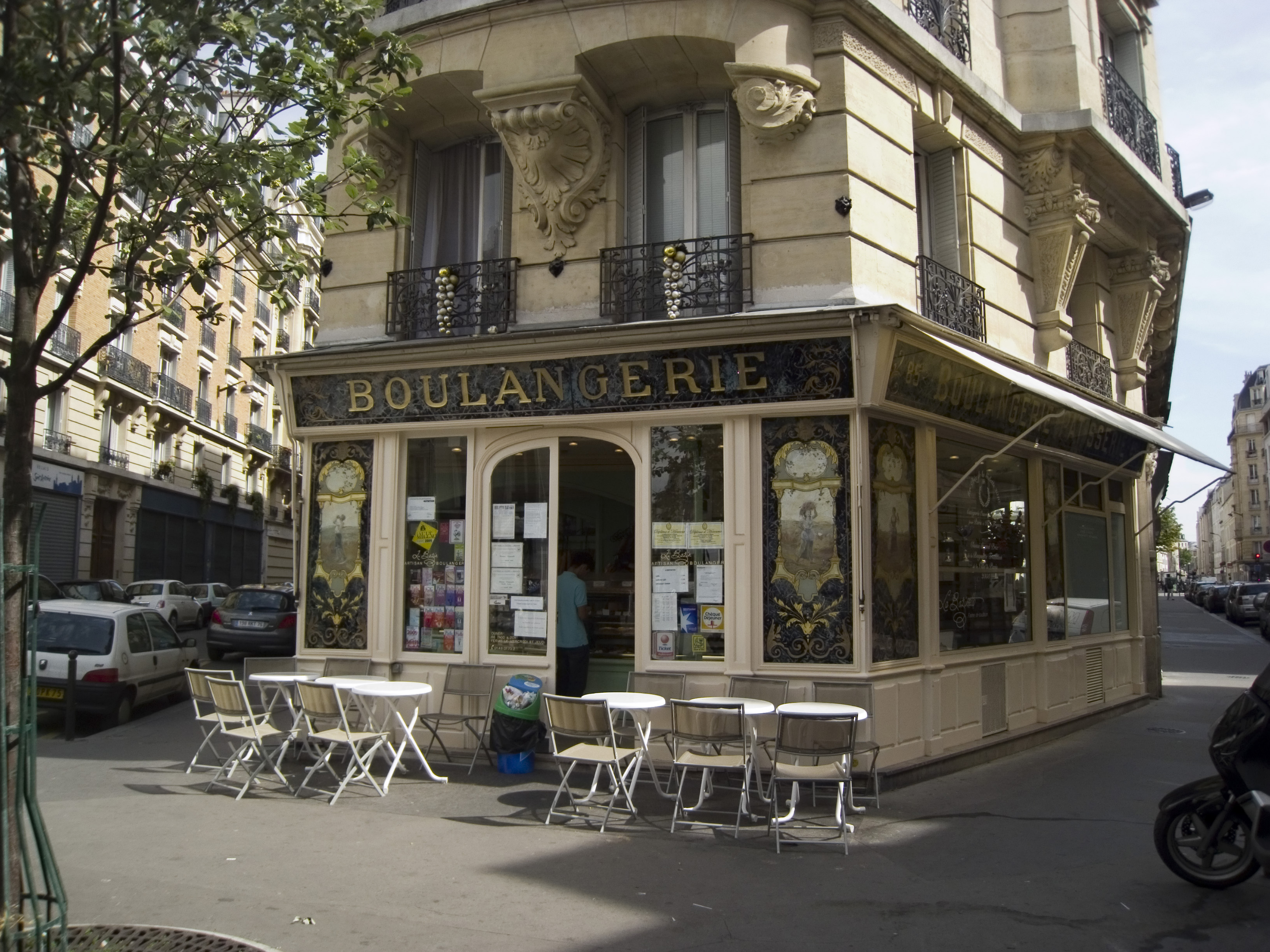
A listed building on the corner of Rue de Charenton and Rue Émilio Castelar.

The Rue de Charenton is a historic street in the 12th arrondissement of Paris, France. Several buildings along the street have been listed as official historical monuments by the French Ministry of Culture, namely numbers 23-25, number 35, numbers 49-51, numbers 59-61, and number 85 bis.
