= Rue Saint-Bernard =

Thoroughfare in Paris, France

Coordinates: 48°51′06″N 2°22′54″E

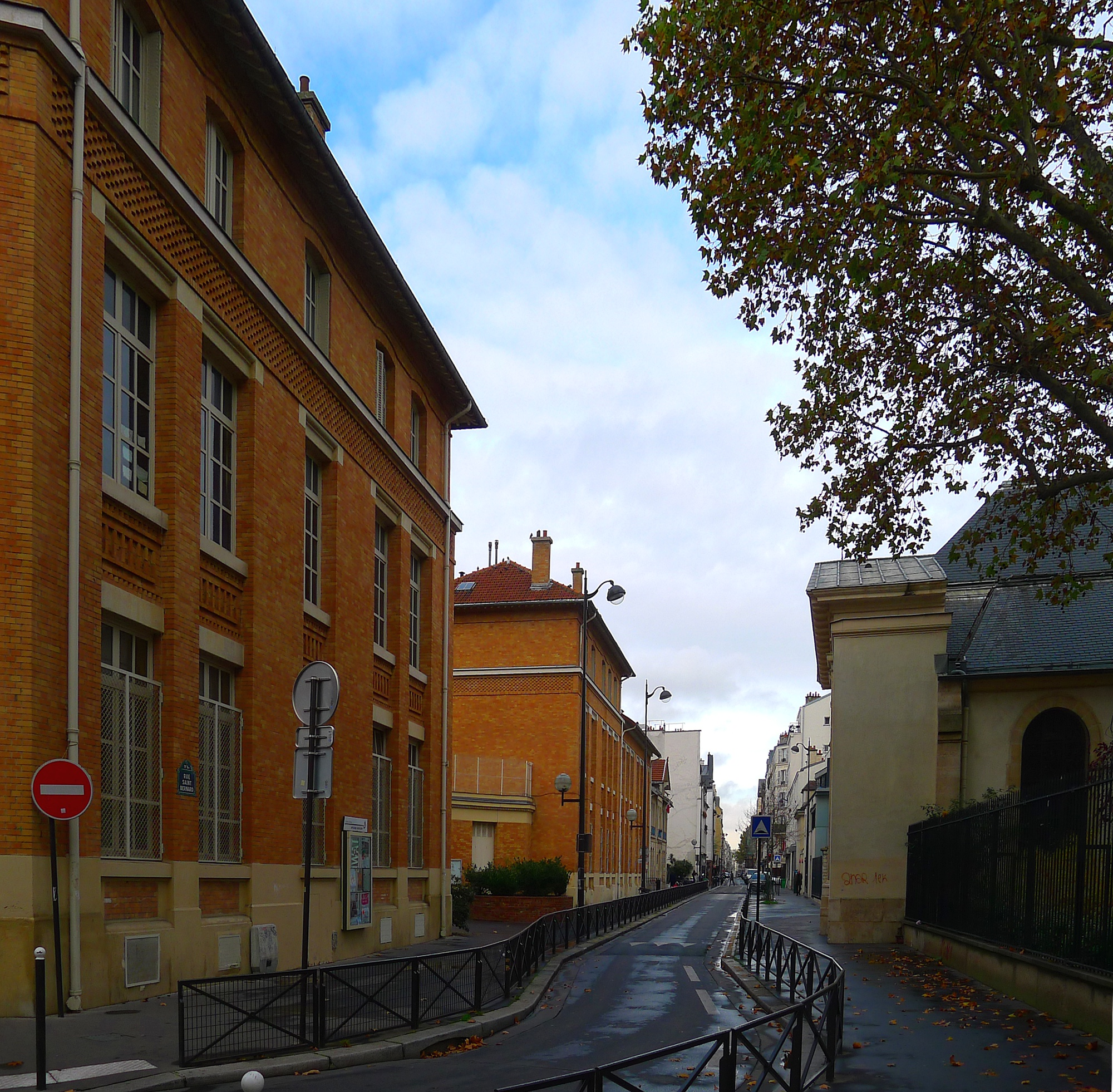
Rue Saint-Bernard

The Rue Saint-Bernard is a street in the 11th arrondissement of Paris. It runs north from the main Rue du Faubourg Saint-Antoine to the Rue Chanzy.

A small urban park, Square Raoul Nordling, is at the north end of the Rue Saint-Bernard.

The church of Sainte-Marguerite is at 36 rue Saint-Bernard.

There are also a creche, nursery school and elementary school named after Saint Bernard on the street.
