= Rue Charlemagne =

Street in Paris, France

Coordinates: 48°51′16″N 2°21′33″E

The Rue Charlemagne (French pronunciation: [ʁy ʃaʁləmaɲ]) is a street in the 4th arrondissement of Paris, in the Saint-Gervais quarter, near the Saint-Paul quarter.

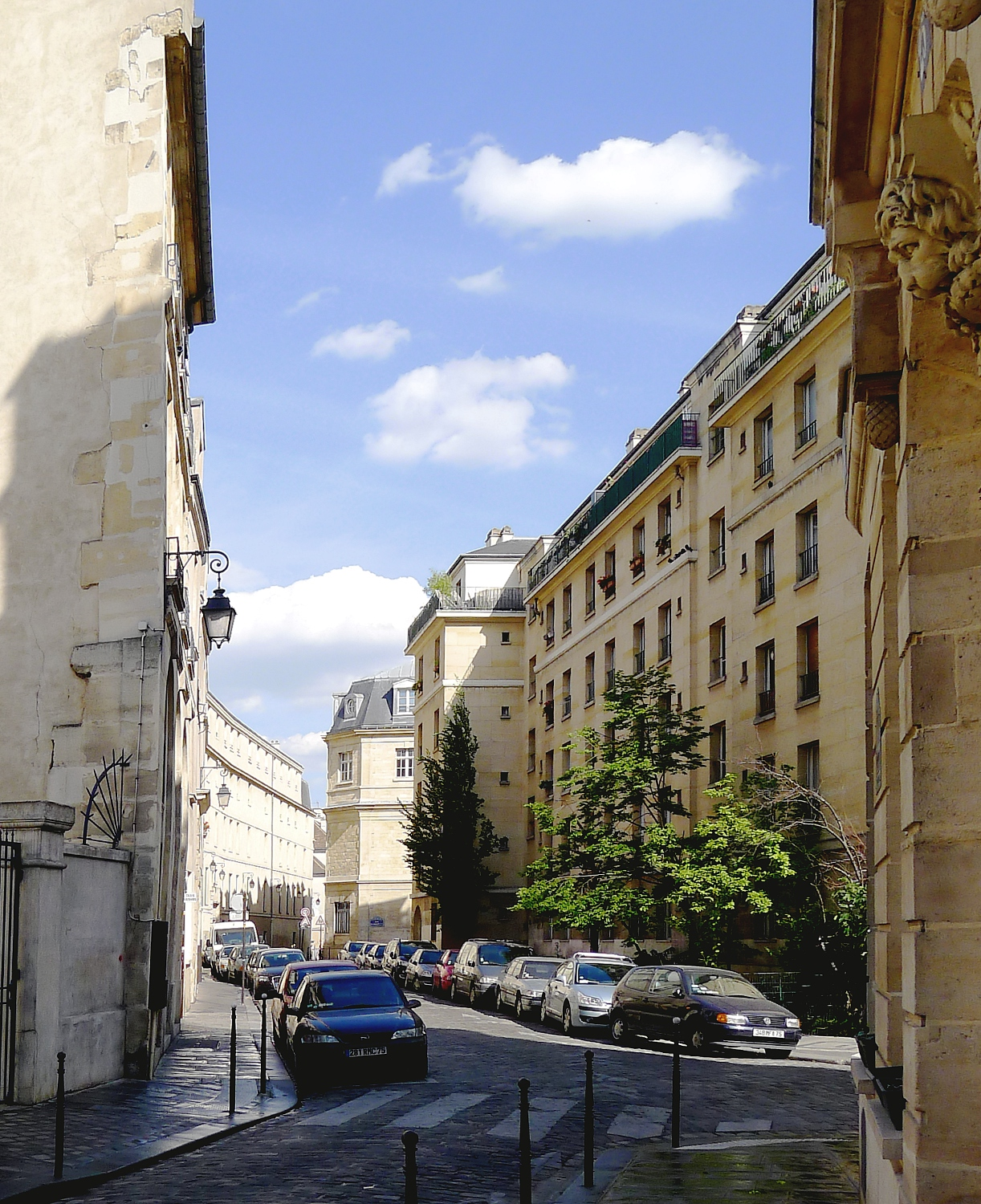
Rue Charlemagne in the 4th arrondissement of Paris
