= Rue Royale =

Rue Royale (French for "Royal Street") may refer to several streets:

- Rue Royale, Brussels, Belgium
- Rue Royale, Lyon, France
- Rue Royale, Paris, France

== See also ==
- Royal Street, New Orleans, United States
- Royal Road (disambiguation)
