= Rue du Mail =

French fashion brand

- Type: Private Company
- Industry: Fashion
- Founded: 2006
- Founder: Jimmy K.W. Chan (Semeiotics, Inc.)
- Headquarters: Paris, France
- Key people: Martine Sitbon, Creative Director; Jimmy K.W. Chan, Chairman/Founder
- Products: Apparel; Accessories; Apparel
- Website: www.ruedumail.com

Rue du Mail is a French fashion house founded in 2006 by Jimmy K. W. Chan, founder and chairman of Semeiotics, Inc. with Martine Sitbon as its founding designer. Rue du Mail collections are sold both internationally and in the headquarter's boutique. In September 2013, the brand suspended all operations.

Rue du Mail hosted its first fashion show during DJ at the Couvent des Cordeliers in 2007. Collaborations with Linda Farrow and Malcolm McLaren followed, and in 2009, the brand presented its fifth collection in the Rue du Mail atelier space. Rue du Mail launched its diffusion line, rdm, in October 2011.

In September 2013, Rue du Mail suspended operations leading to the last catwalk collection by the label never arriving in stores.
