= Lycée Rocroy-Saint-Léon =

Rocroy Saint-Vincent de Paul

Location
- 106 rue du Faubourg-Poissonnière, Paris; France
- Coordinates: 48.878656°N 2.349347°E

Information
- Motto: In labore Requies (Rest in Labour (Note: Mis en musique par Axel Casadesus, ancien professeur, https://soundcloud.com/axel-casadesus/in-labore-requies))
- Website: rocroysvp.fr

Located at 106, rue du Faubourg-Poissonnière in the 10th arrondissement of Paris, Rocroy Saint-Vincent de Paul is a mixed private Catholic school under contract of association with the State.

== History ==
Opened in 1877 by Abbott Léon Berthé, the school occupies 106 and 108 rue du Faubourg-Poissonnière, two 17th-century houses that were owned during the French Revolution by Baron de Dietrich. It was in the baron's home in Strasbourg that Rouget de Lisle first sang the La Marseillaise.

In October 1877, the school had 142 students. In 1888, the alumni association was formed.

In 1929, Jean Delsuc created the 65th Paris Scouts de France at Rocroy Saint-Léon, then a college of Guy de Larigaudie. The college is immediately next door to Saint-Vincent-de-Paul, Paris and its 55th. After the occupation, the school had 660 students, and its new group of teachers included Roger Vrigny, Grand prix de littérature de l'Académie française

The primary school became mixed in 1960. The following year the school entered into a contract of association with the state.

In 2008, Rocroy Saint-Léon joined with École Saint-Vincent de Paul and Lycée Petrelle to form the group Rocroy Saint-Vincent de Paul. The new group occupies 3 sites:

- The école Saint-Vincent de Paul at 6 rue de Rocroy (Kindergarten, primary, and year six)

- The institution Rocroy Saint-Léon at 106, rue du Faubourg-Poissonnière (from year five to year two)

- The lycée Pétrelle au 8, rue Pétrelle (first and last year).

In 2012, the establishment had 1750 students.

Today, Rocroy Saint-Vincent de Paul accepts students from kindergarten to the final year, and after their studies, many continue on to classe préparatoire aux grandes écoles, especially in medical education ou de law.

== Lycée ranking ==
In 2015, the lycée ranked 13th out of 109 at départemental level in teaching quality, and 132nd at national level. The ranking is based on three criteria: the level of bac results, the proportion of students who obtain the baccalauréat having spent their last two years in the establishment, and the added value (calculated based on the social origin of the students, their age, and their national diploma results).

Since 2010, the lycée has always achieved at least 80% of honours and 99% of baccalauréat results.

== See also ==
- Souvenirs De L'école Rocroy Saint-Léon. Causeries Et Discours. by Abbé Berthe, published 1889 by Typographie Georges Chamerot
- École diocésaine Rocroy Saint Léon annuaire 1935 published 1935 by imprimerie Lorraine.

== Alumni ==
- Pierre Delanoë, singer, writer, former head of SACEM
- Guy de Larigaudie, writer, journalist
- Robert Chapuis, politician
- Malika Ferdjoukh, writer
- Jacques Dutronc, singer, composer, and actor
- Stefan Wul, writer
- David Martinon, politician, diplomat
- Mgr Claude Frikart, general vicar of the Archdiocese of Paris
- Pierre Fanlac, printer, editor and writer
- Lord Esperanza rapper
- Jean-Marc Irollo historian
- Augustin "Review" Heliot Content creator on youtube, his own channel name is " TheGreatReview "

== Notes and references ==
Notes
