= Landscape near Beauvais =

Painting by François Boucher

Landscape Near Beauvais
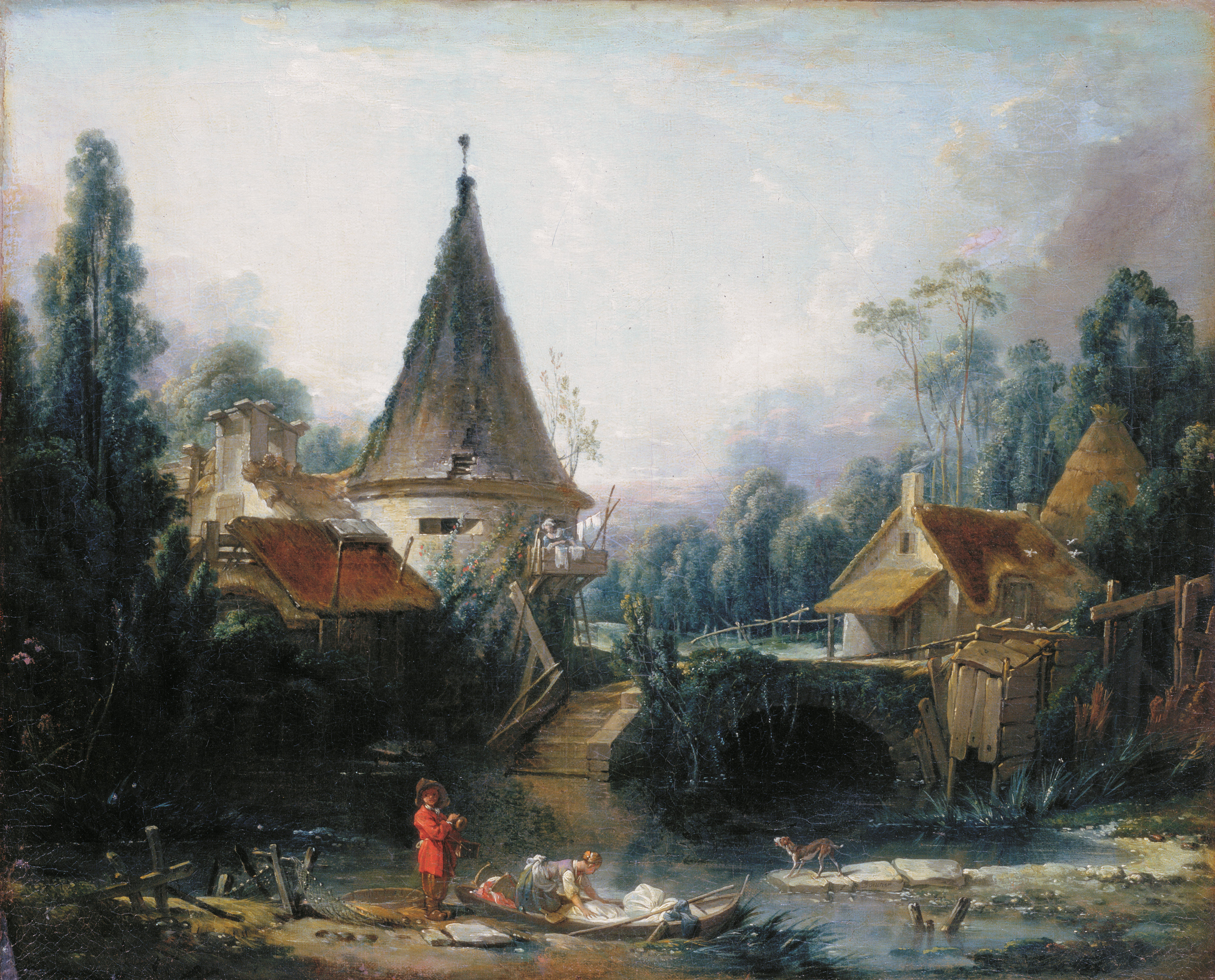
- Artist: François Boucher
- Year: 1740s
- Medium: oil on canvas
- Dimensions: 49 cm × 58 cm (19 in × 23 in)
- Location: Hermitage, St Petersburg

Landscape Near Beauvais is an oil-on-canvas painting by François Boucher, dated to the 1740s and now in the Hermitage Museum in St Petersburg.

It shows a landscape near Beauvais and is signed bottom right "F. Boucher". Its dating is based on similarities to later works produced by the artist whilst working at the Beauvais Manufactory (1743–1755). The catalogue of the 1740 Paris Salon mentions "A landscape ... in which a mill can be seen" and that for 1743 "A landscape with a water mill". A canvas was painted in 1743 as a pendant to the work now in the Hermitage. It is also mentioned in the catalogue of the 1743 Salon as "Its Pendant", showing an old tower.

A drawing precisely copying the left side of the painting is now in the Rijksmuseum in Amsterdam. In the mid-18th century the Hermitage painting was part of the Lenoir collection and at the start of the 20th century of the Olive collection in St Petersburg. It entered the Hermitage in 1923. It was transferred to Moscow in 1925 as part of the collections of the Museum of Western Art, located in the former town house of Sergei Shchukin, before returning to the Hermitage in 1930.

== Exhibition history ==
- 1742, Paris Salon (Vue des environs de Beauvais) ;
- 1956, Leningrad, French art from the 12th to the 20th century;
- 1970, Leningrad, François Boucher exhibition.

== Bibliography ==
- (in French) Louis Auvray, Dictionnaire général des artistes de l'école française, volume I, Paris, 1882
- (in Dutch) Johan Quirijn van Regteren Altena, 'Het landschap bij Beauvais van F. Boucher', in Bulletin van het Rijksmuseum, 1959, no. 2
