= Rue Bleue =

Street in Paris, France

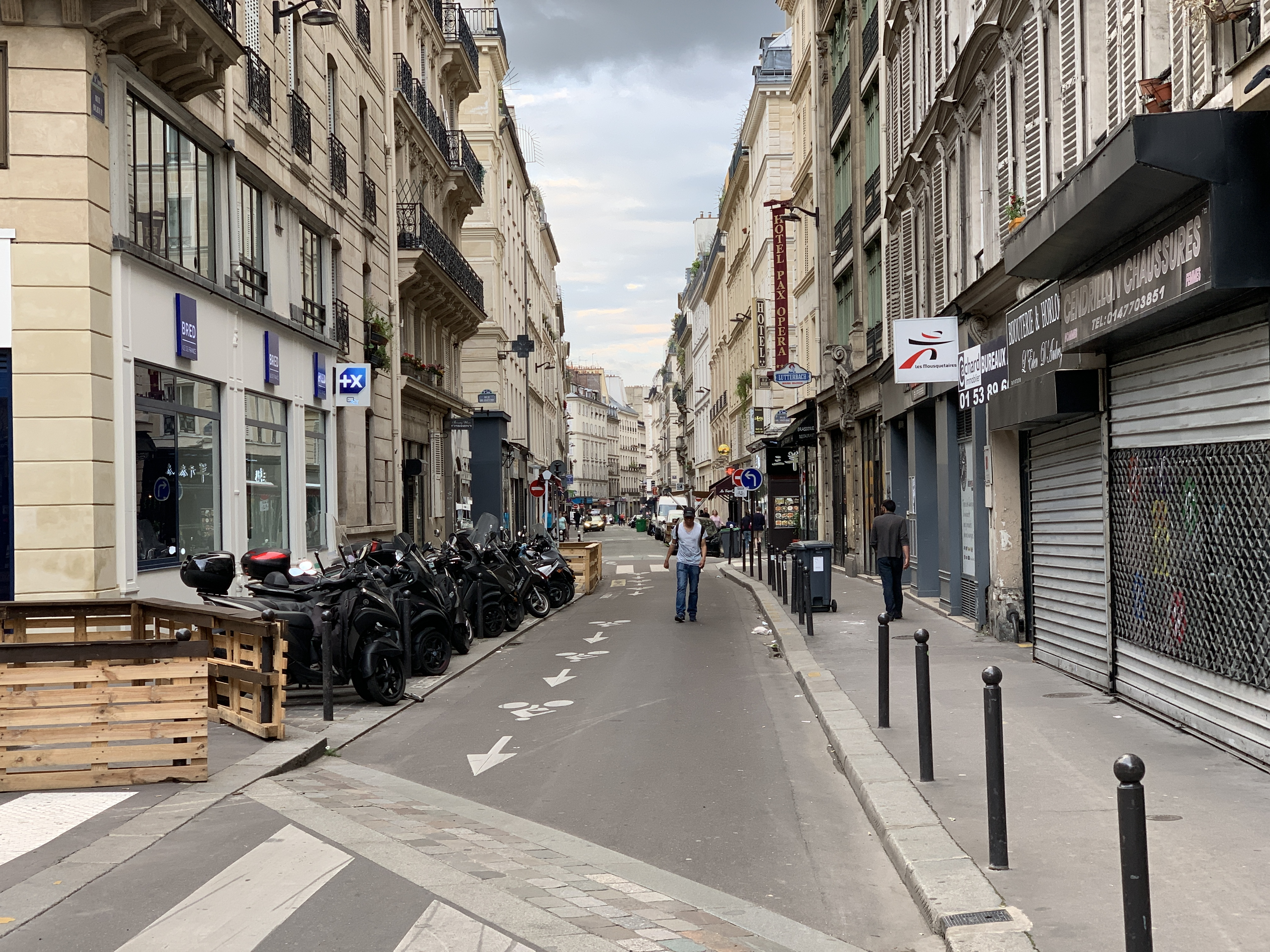

- Location within Paris
- Arrondissement: 9th
- Quarter: Quartier du Faubourg-Montmartre
- Coordinates: 48°52′33.633″N 2°20′41.113″E
- From: Rue du Faubourg-Poissonnière
- To: Rue La Fayette

The Rue Bleue is a street in the 9th arrondissement of Paris.

== Origin of the name ==
In February 1789 Louis Philippe II, Duke of Orléans had the name of the street changed by a decree of the King's Council (February 19, 1789): "The Rue d'Enfer will henceforth be called the Rue Bleue, a name which will be more easily remembered than any other, given that in the same district there is one which bears the name of Rue Verte").

Another source said that the route is named after a factory making blue ballsfounded in this street in 1802.

== Notable places ==
- No. 1: Italian terrorist Cesare Battisti lived in the building, where he was arrested in 2004.
- No. 3: Chemist and balloonist Gaston Tissandier lived there in 1899.
- Between nos. 5 and 7 is the entrance to the Cité Trévise.
- No. 9: The main campus of the fashion school MOD'SPE Paris.
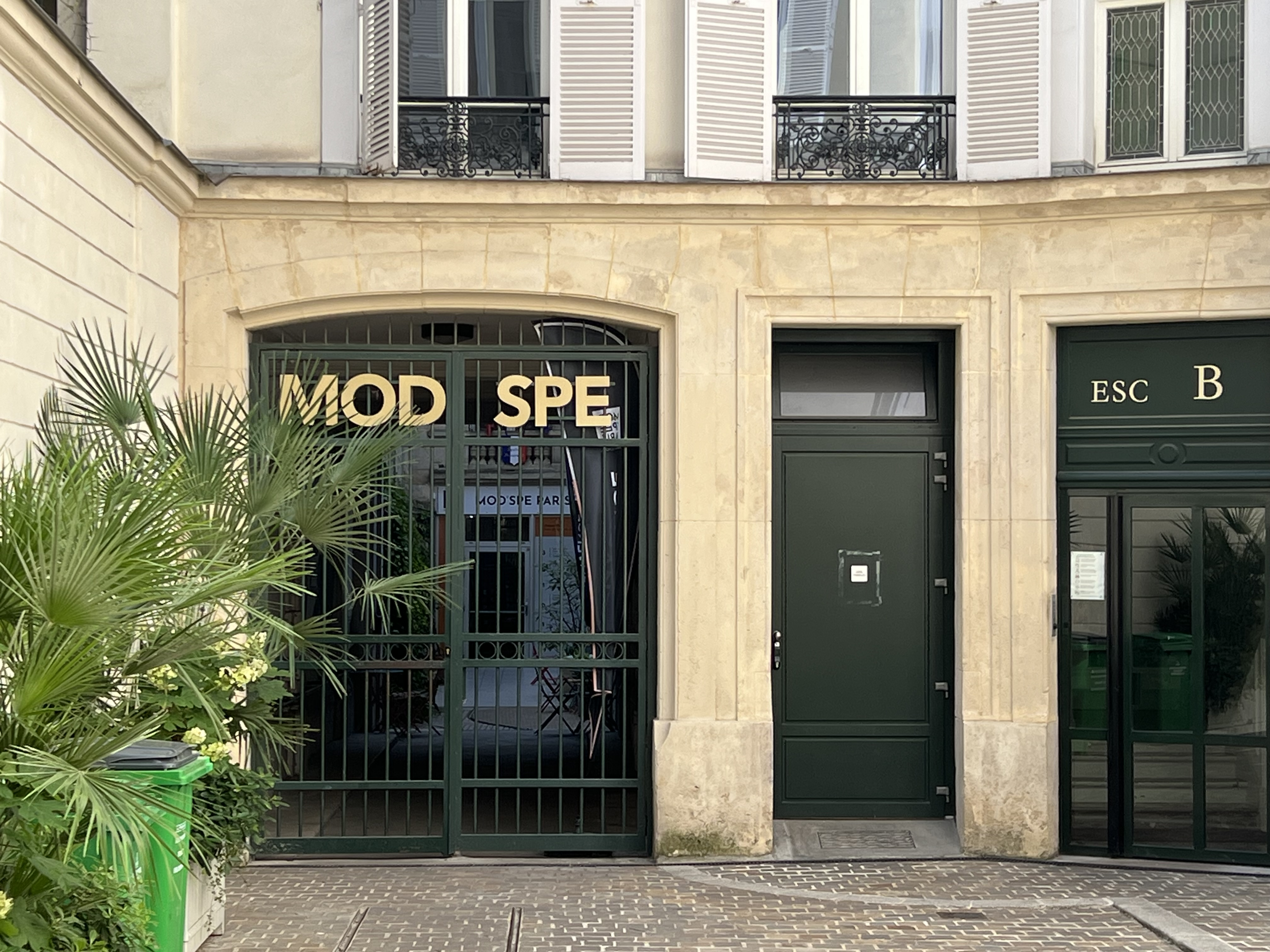
MOD'SPE Paris
