= Rue La Fayette =

Street in Paris, France

Coordinates: 48.8781°N 2.3528°E

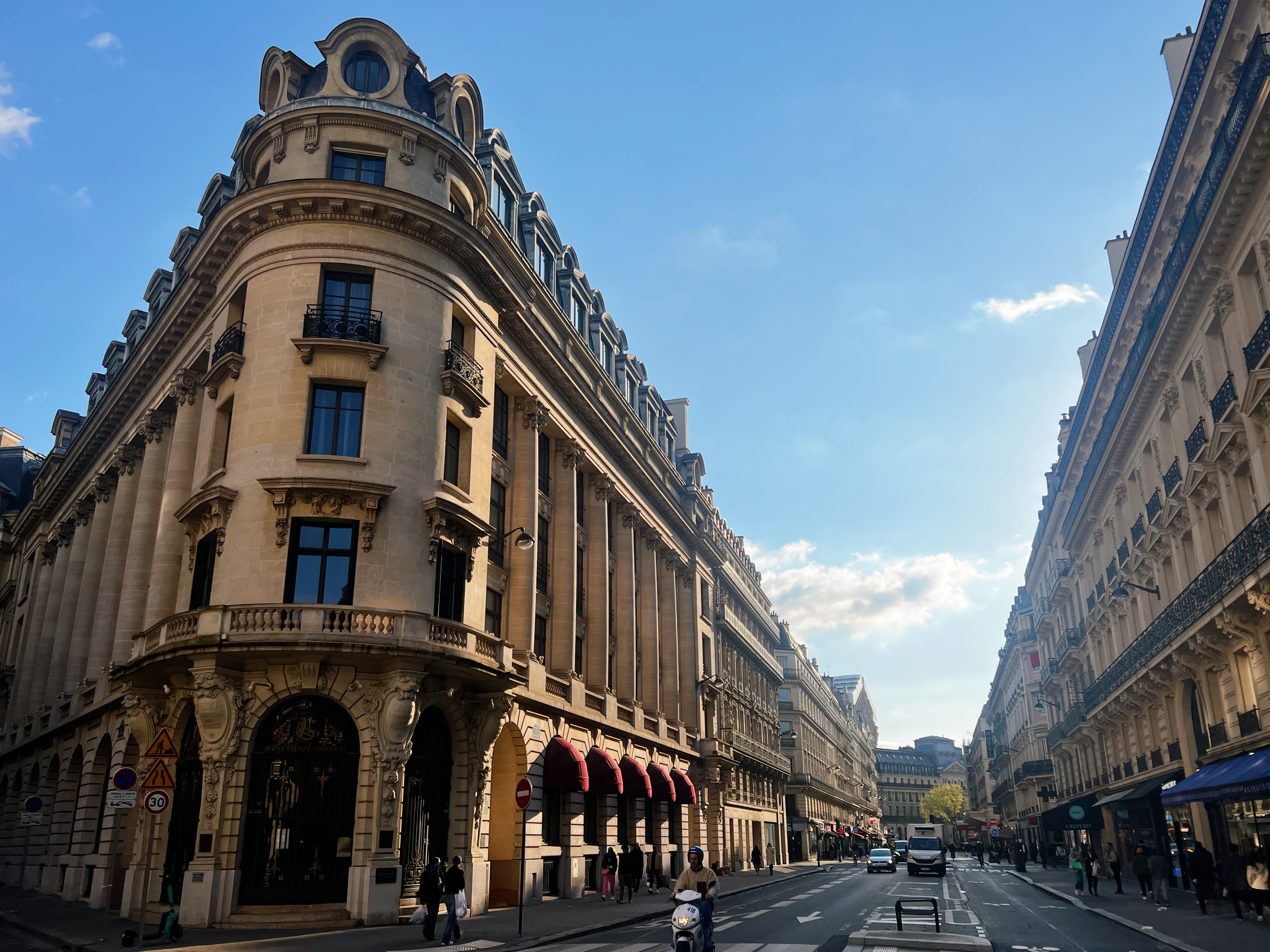
Rue La Fayette

The Rue La Fayette is a street in the 9th and 10th arrondissement of Paris, between the Rue du Faubourg Saint-Martin and the Rue du Faubourg-Poissonnière.

== History ==
The street was opened in 1823. It was created by Claude Rambuteau and Georges-Eugène Haussmann. It was the original location of the Galeries Lafayette.

This street bears the name of the Marquis de La Fayette, hero of the American Revolutionary War, and prominent figure in the French Revolution and the July Revolution.
