= Louis Auvray =

French sculptor and art critic (1810–1890)

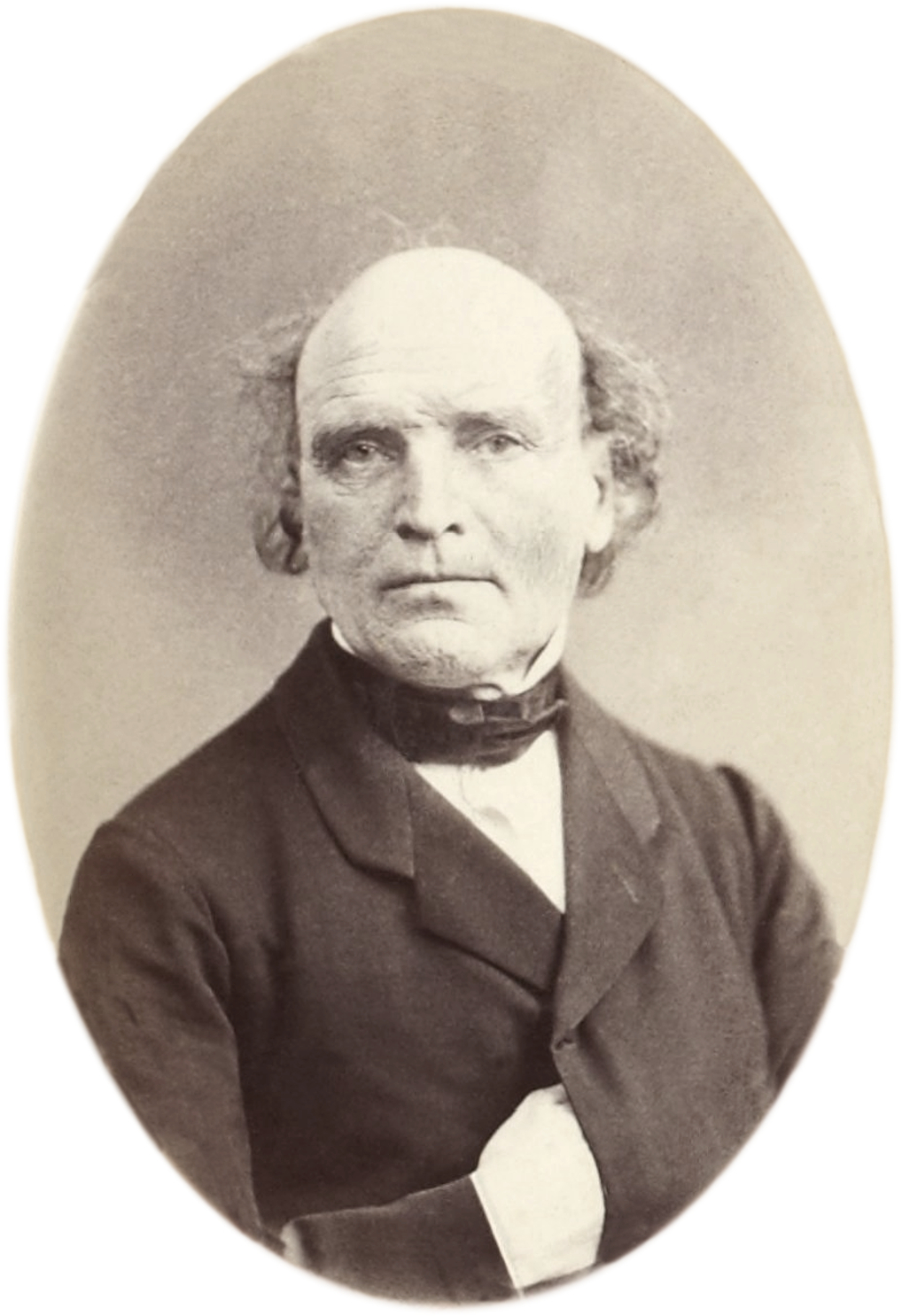
Louis Auvray (c.1860)

Louis Auvray (French: [ovʁɛ]; 7 April 1810 in Valenciennes – 27 April 1890 in Paris) was a French sculptor and art critic. He was the pupil of David d'Angers and was the brother of Félix Auvray, a painter. He continued the Dictionnaire Général des Artistes de l'école française depuis l'origine des arts du dessin jusqu'à nos jours, started by Émile Bellier de La Chavignerie.

== Main works ==
- Portrait d'Alexandre-Charles Sauvageot, 1863, bust, marble, Paris, Louvre
- Portrait du peintre Gentile Bellini, 1871, bust, marble, Paris, Louvre
- Portrait du chroniqueur Jean Froissart, 1843, bust, marble, Versailles
- Portrait du musicien Jean-François Lesueur, bust, marble, Versailles
- Portrait du sculpteur Jacques François Joseph Saly, bust, marble, Versailles
- Portrait du sculpteur Jacques François Joseph Saly, 1838, bust, marble, Valenciennes
