= Histoire de Paris plaques =

Paris plaques

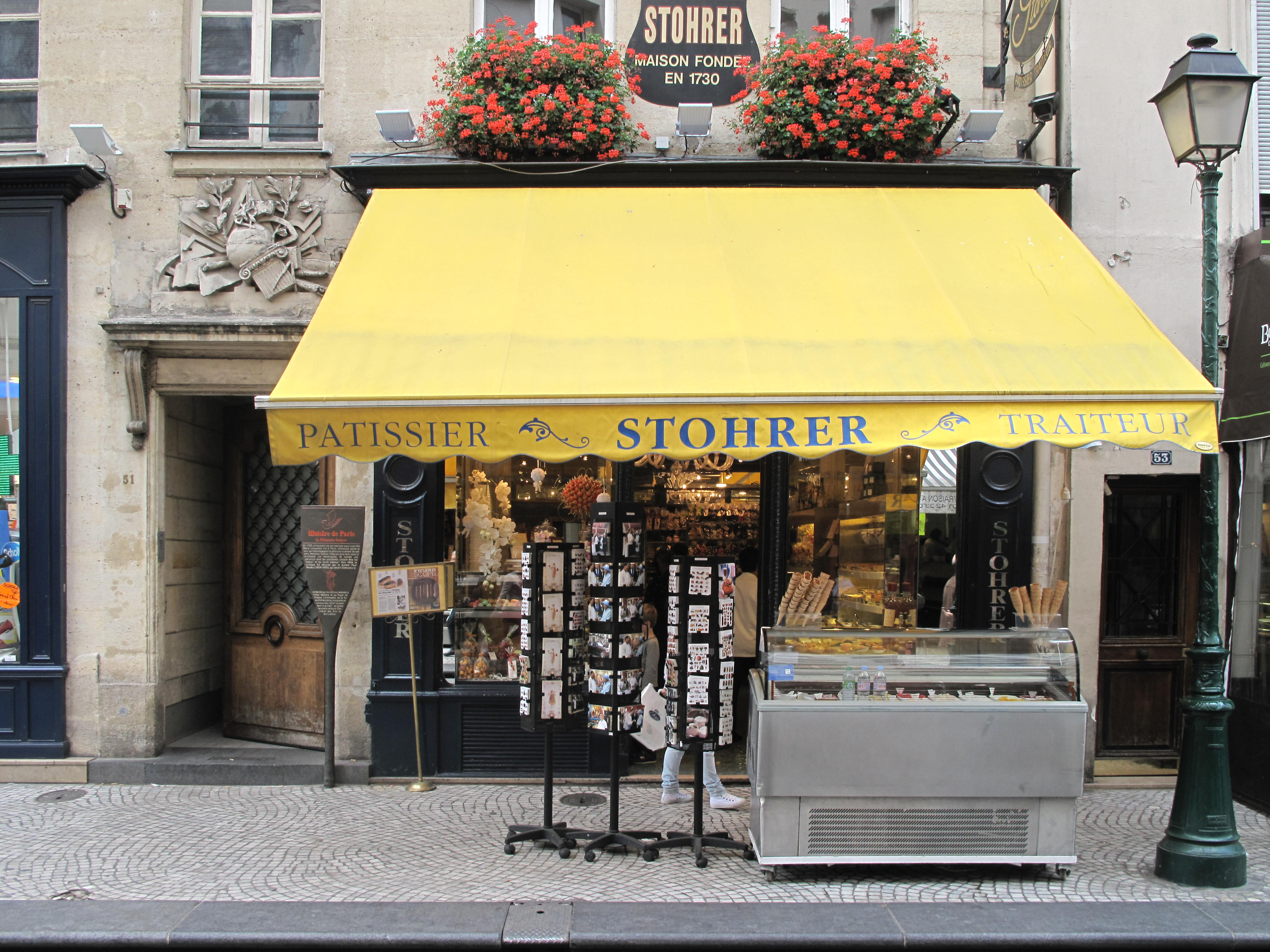
One of the "Histoire de Paris" plaques, situated to the left of a shop window on the Rue Montorgueil

Close-up of one of these panels

The "Histoire de Paris" plaques (sometimes called Starck Oars because of their shape and their designer, Philippe Starck) are information plaques scattered throughout the City of Paris in front of various Parisian monuments.

== History ==
The plaques were installed from 1992 under the tenure of Jacques Chirac, then-mayor of Paris. The market offer was won by the company JCDecaux, based on a model designed by Philippe Starck.

Since 2009, the City of Paris pays €1.2 million each year to JCDecaux for the maintenance of the signs. The same year, a call for projects was launched to replace them with interactive terminals. In 2022, this replacement has still not taken place, and many signs are in need of cleaning or rehabilitation.

The City of Paris does not have a complete and detailed inventory, so the total number of panels installed varies according to sources: 767, 672, etc. As of 2011, around forty appear to have disappeared following works.

== Features ==
Each plaque takes the shape of a cast iron oar painted dark grey, but is actually meant to recall a ship's paddle, in honour of the Latin motto of the City of Paris, Fluctuat nec mergitur ("battered by the waves, but never capsized"). The handle of the "oar" is sunk into the ground; the plaque itself, located at adult height, has in its upper third, in red lines, a stylized version of the ship from the coat of arms of Paris, the words "Histoire de Paris" and a short descriptive title. The lower two thirds bear an explanatory text, in white characters, as well as generally an illustration, in red.

The plaques are installed on public roads. They deal with various historical subjects (existing or disappeared monuments, events, etc.). They are fondly regarded by most Parisians, as they highlight the city's cultural and political history. The Neolithic period is the earliest era referred to, but there are 21st-century references, particularly to painters and writers. The only translations of the plaques into English is via the Paris by Plaque walking guide series, which translates the text and places it in historical context, explaining the references and providing photos.
