= Guy de Larigaudie =

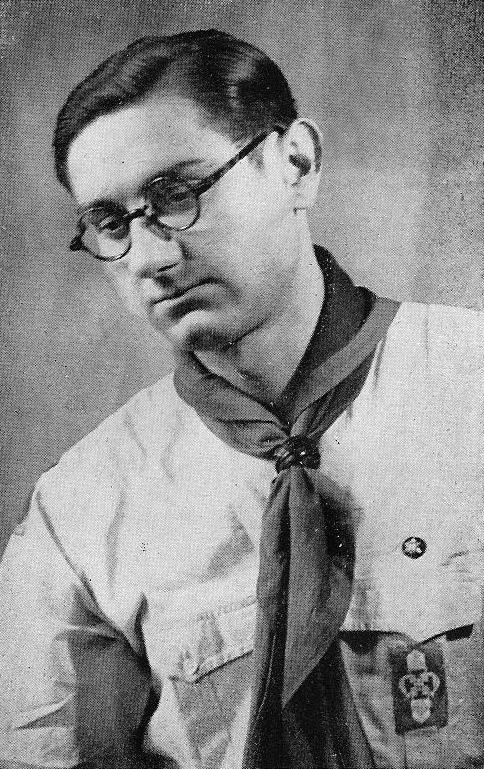
- Born: January 18, 1908; Paris
- Died: May 11, 1940 (aged 32); Musson, Belgium
- Occupation: Writer
- Writing career
- Subjects: Scouting and travel

Guillaume Boulle de Larigaudie (Paris, January 18, 1908 – May 11, 1940 Musson, Belgium), known as Guy de Larigaudie and the "legendary Rover", was a French writer of Scout novels and travel books, Rover Scout of France, writer, explorer, lecturer and journalist.

His notes and thoughts from his adventures can be found mainly in the 1943 book Étoile au grand large.

== Publications ==
=== Books for young people ===
- Yug, éditions Jean de Gigord, collection "Le feu de camp", 1934 (reissued by Éditions Delahaye, 2004 ISBN 9782350470009)
- Raa la buse, éditions Jean de Gigord, collection "Le feu de camp", 1935
- L'Îlot du grand étang, éditions Jean de Gigord, collection "Le feu de camp", 1936
- Le Tigre et sa panthère, Alsatia, collection "Signe de piste", 1937
- Yug en terres inconnues, éditions Jean de Gigord, collection "Le feu de camp", 1938
- La Frégate aventurière, Alsatia, collection "Signe de piste", 1938
- Harka le barzoï, éditions Jean de Gigord, collection "Le feu de camp", 1939
- La Légende du ski, illustrations by Samivel, Éditions Delagrave, 1940

=== Travel books ===
- Vingt scouts autour du monde, Desclée de Brouwer, 1935
- Par trois routes américaines, Desclée de Brouwer, 1937
- Résonances du Sud (account of his travels in Polynesia), Plon, Paris, 1938
- La Route aux aventures (account of his journey by car from Paris to Saïgon), Plon, Paris, 1939

=== Posthumous publications ===
- Étoile au grand large, suivi du Chant du vieux pays (spiritual testament), Seuil, Paris, 1943 (ISBN 2020029650)
- Le Beau Jeu de ma vie (collected correspondence), Seuil, Paris, 1948 (ISBN 9782020029810)

== Biographies ==
- Jean Peyrade, Routiers de France, Le Puy en Velay, Xavier Mappus, 1944
- Jean Vaulon, Guy de Larigaudie, routier de légende, Lyon, La Hutte, collection "Amitié des héros", 1944
- Pierre Croidys, Guy de Larigaudie, Paris, Plon, 1947
- Jean Peyrade, Guy de Larigaudie ou l'aventure intérieure, Bruxelles, Casterman, 1948 (plus several subsequent editions and translations)
- Louis-Bernard Koch, Guy Lehideux and Charlie Kiéfer, Avec Guy de Larigaudie, sur les chemins de l'aventure, Éditions du Triomphe, 2000
- Guy Demange, Au pays de Guy de Larigaudie, 2016, Bellegarde, 32 pp. (ISBN 9782900022184)
- Association des Écrivains combattants, Georges Cerbelaud-Salagnac, Anthologie de écrivains morts à la guerre (1939-1945), Paris, Éditions Albin Michel, pp. 424-433 (reissued 2017)
