= Alexandre-Charles Sauvageot =

Alexandre-Charles Sauvageot (French pronunciation: [alɛksɑ̃dʁ ʃaʁl sovaʒo]; Paris, 6 November 1781 – 30 March 1860) was a French classical violinist and collector of French antiques.

The son of Jean Sauvageot, bourgeois and Françoise-Antoinette Frené, he was single.

== Career ==
Until 1829 he was second violin at the Paris opera and since 1810 clerk at the Direction des Douanes and Honorary Curator of the Imperial Museums.

From 1826-1827, he gathered a very important collection of objects from the Middle Ages and the Renaissance - art objects, sculptures, paintings, ivories, musical instruments, etc. - which he donated to the Louvre Museum in 1856 and again in 1860. A room in the Louvre - where he occupied an apartment from 1858 - bears his name.

== Legacy ==
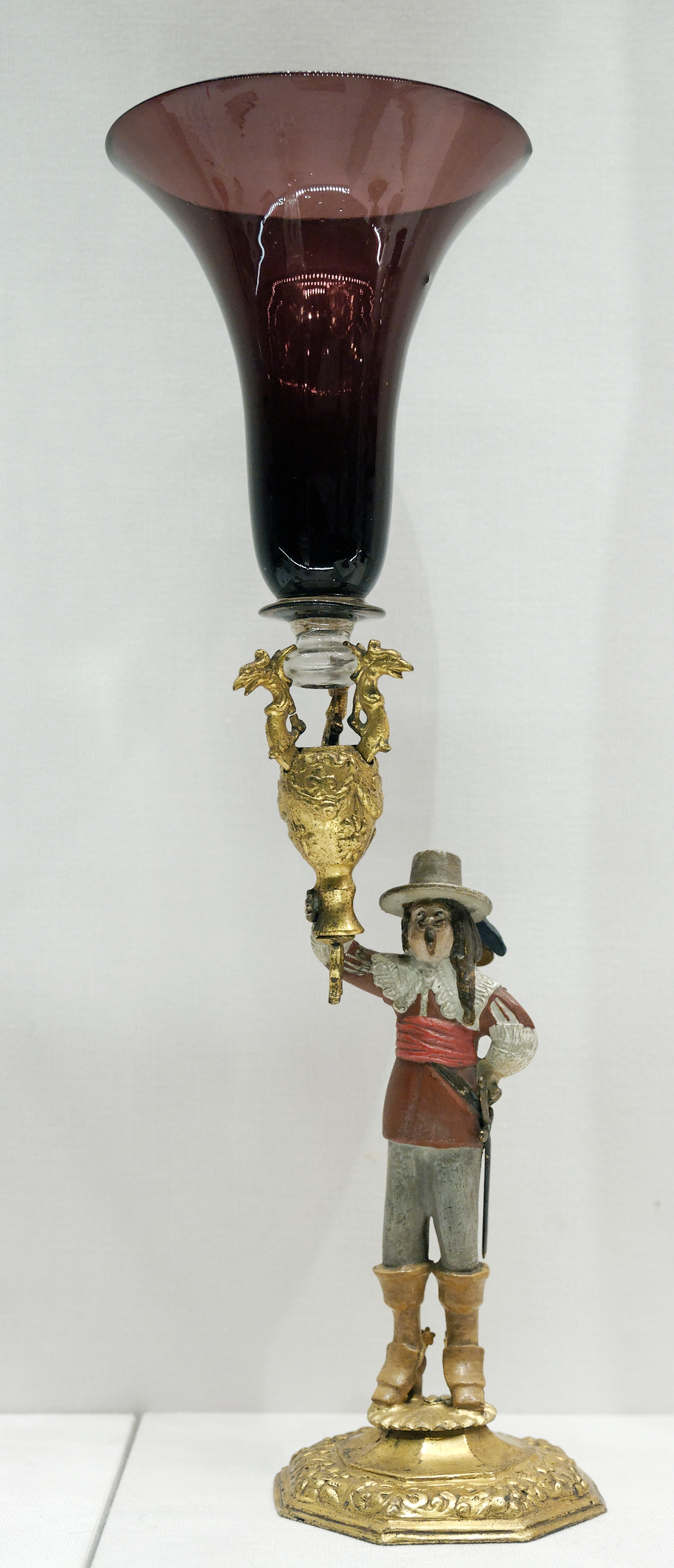
Glass piece given to the Louvre

Among the objects donated is an Italian harpsichord by Pietro Faby, built in Bologne in 1691, deposited at the Philharmonie de Paris with 13 other instruments.

We keep a portrait of him by his friend Louis-Pierre Henriquel-Dupont (drawing from 1833, engraving from 1852) and a painting from 1857 by Arthur Henry Roberts showing him in the middle of his collections in the dining room of his apartment, 56 rue du Faubourg-Poissonnière.
