= Quartier de la Chaussée-d'Antin =

Coordinates: 48.8721384°N 2.3306302°E

Chaussée-d'Antin
- Quartier de la Chaussée-d'Antin
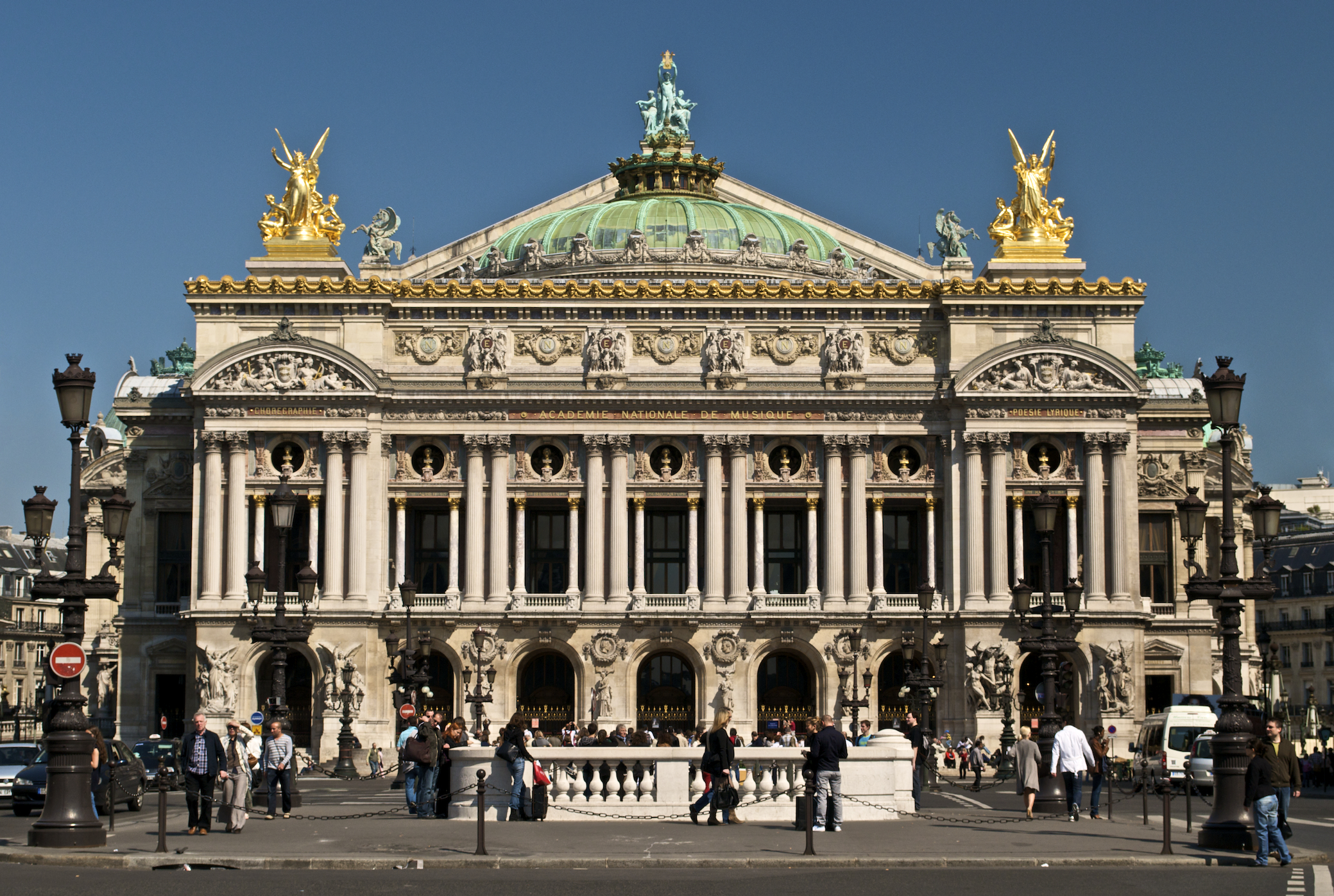
- Paris Opera
- Interactive map of Chaussée-d'Antin
- Country: France
- Region: Île-de-France
- Ville: Paris
- Arrondissement: 9th

Area
  - Total: 0.543 km^{2} (0.210 sq mi)

Population (2016)
  - Total: 4,810
  - Density: 8,858/km^{2} (22,940/sq mi)

The Quartier de la Chaussée-d'Antin is the 34th administrative district of Paris, located in the 9th arrondissement.

== Situation ==
Quarters of the 9th arrondissement.

The neighborhood is bounded by:

- Boulevard des Capucines,
- Boulevard des Italiens,
- Rue Vignon,
- Rue Tronchet,
- Rue du Havre,
- Rue Saint-Lazare,
- Rue Laffitte.

It is crossed by Boulevard Haussmann, Rue de la Victoire, Rue de Provence, Rue La Fayette, Rue Taitbout, Rue Auber, Rue Scribe, Rue Halévy, Rue Gluck, Rue Meyerbeer, Rue de Chateaudun, Rue du Helder, Rue de Caumartin, Rue Godot-de-Mauroy…

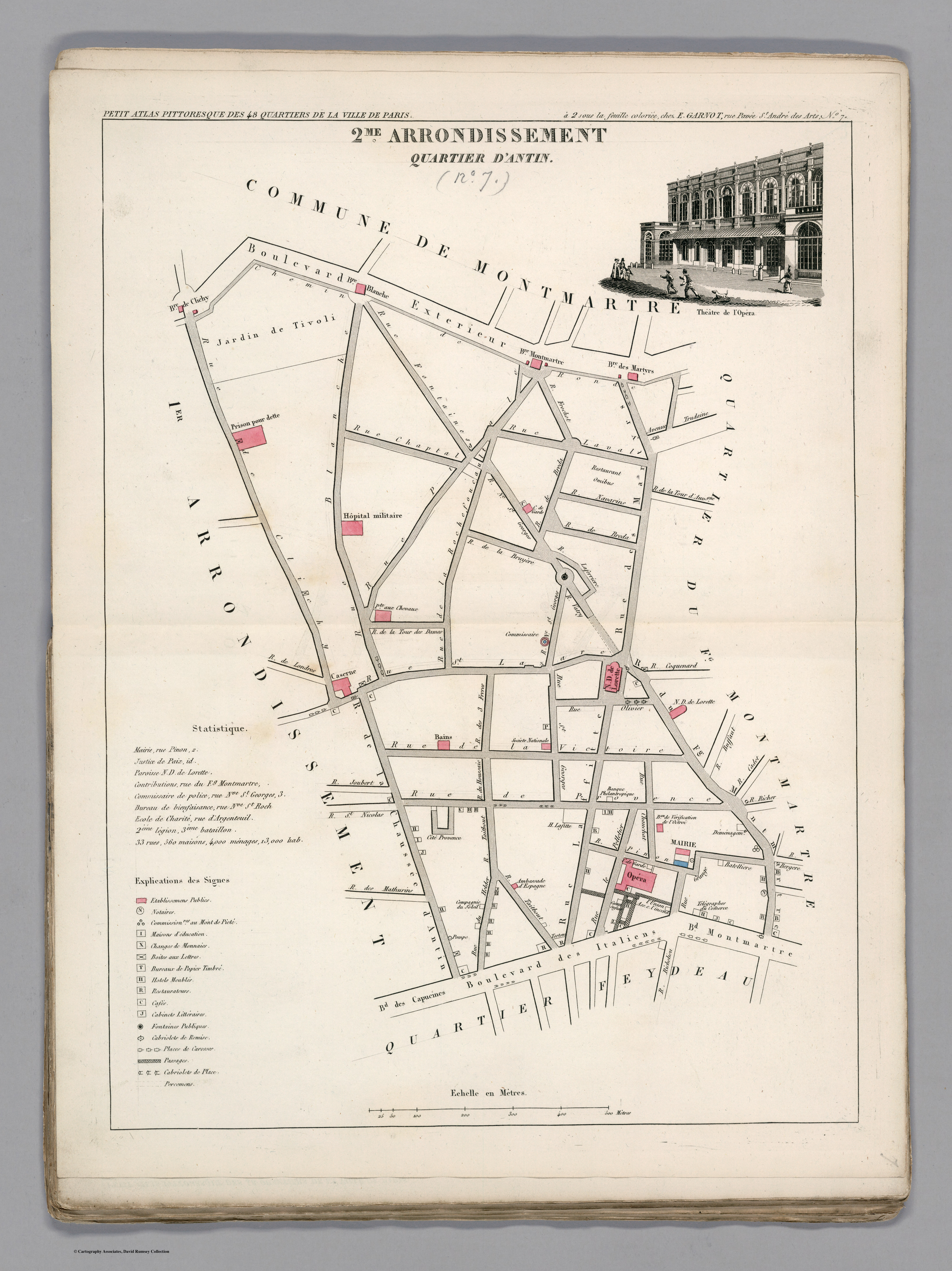
Map of the Chaussée-d'Antin neighborhood in the former 2nd arrondissement in 1834.

== Origin of the name ==
The neighborhood takes its name from the Rue de la Chaussée-d'Antin.

== Notable buildings and sites of memory ==
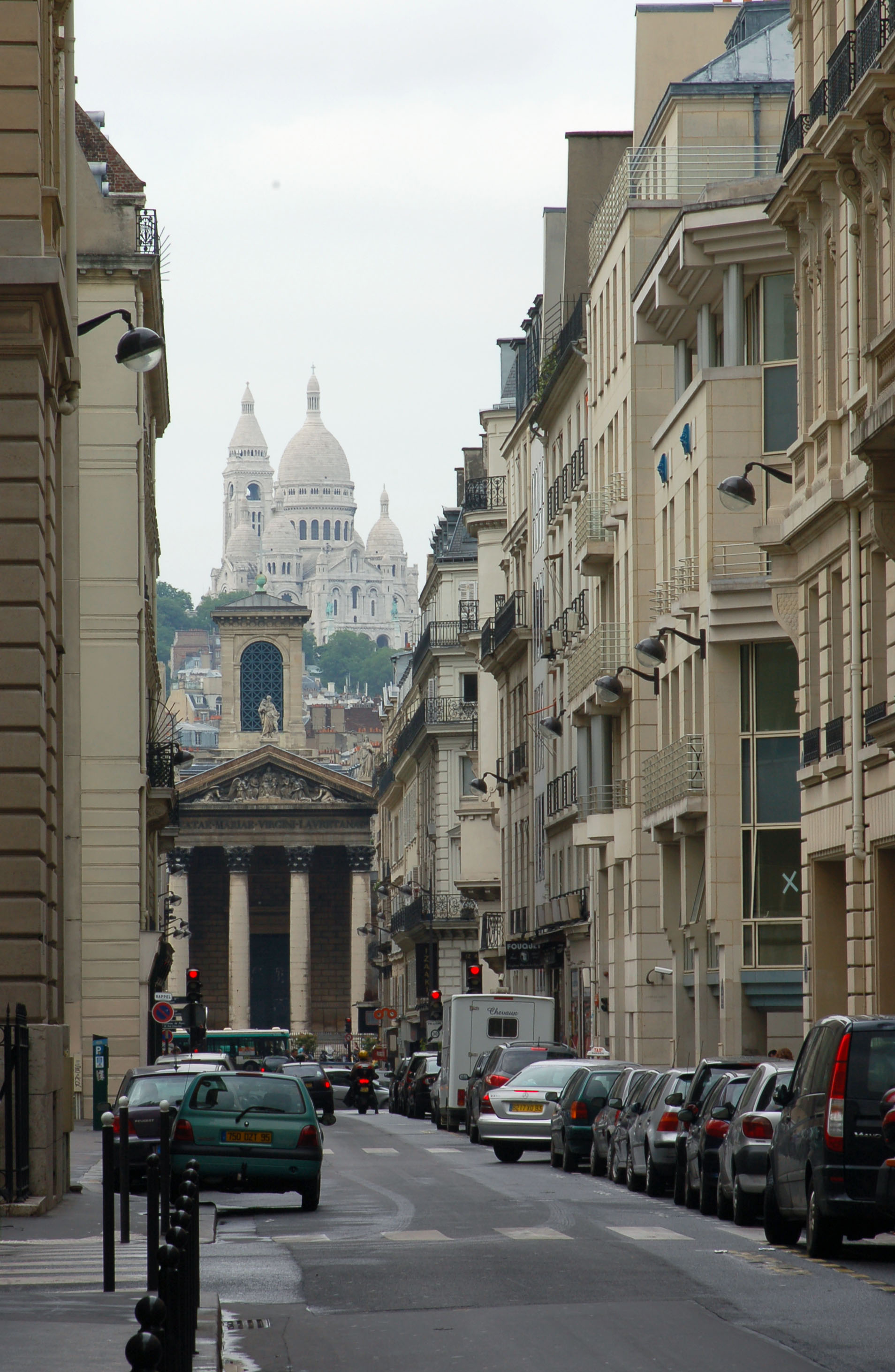
Rue Laffitte, with the façade of the church of Notre-Dame-de-Lorette.

- Palais Garnier
- Lycée Condorcet
- Notre-Dame-de-Lorette, Paris
- Saint-Louis-d'Antin
- Great Synagogue of Paris
- Cité d'Antin
- Printemps Haussmann
- Galeries Lafayette Haussmann
- Fnac Saint-Lazare
- Square de l'Opéra-Louis-Jouvet
- Place Édouard-VII
- Place de l'Opéra
- Théâtre de l'Athénée
- Théâtre Édouard VII
- L'Olympia

== Bibliography ==
- Pierre Pinon, « Le lotissement de la rue Taibout et du couvent des Capucins. La Chaussée-d’Antin à la fin du 18th century », Bulletin de la Société de l'histoire de Paris et de l'Île-de-France, 1988, p. 223-302.
- François Loyer (dir.), Autour de l'Opéra. Naissance de la ville nouvelle, Délégation à l'action artistique de la Ville de Paris, Paris, 1995 ISBN 2-905-118-81-4.
