= Incroyables and merveilleuses =

Fashionable aristocratic subculture in Paris during the French Directory (1795–1799)

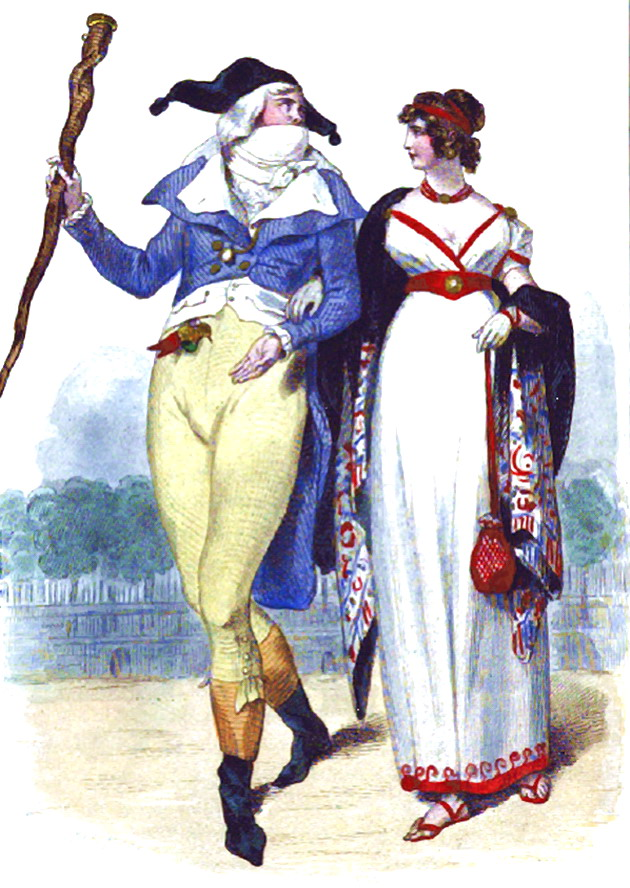
Picture from Les Français sous la Révolution by Augustin Challamel & Wilhelm Ténint

The Incroyables (French: [ɛ̃kʁwajabl], "incredibles") and their female counterparts, the Merveilleuses (French: [mɛʁvɛjøz], "marvelous women"), were members of a fashionable aristocratic subculture in Paris during the French Directory (1795–1799). Whether as catharsis or in a need to reconnect with other survivors of the Reign of Terror, they greeted the new regime with an outbreak of luxury, decadence, and even silliness. They held hundreds of balls and started fashion trends in clothing and mannerisms that today seem exaggerated, affected, or even effete. They were also mockingly called "incoyable" or "meveilleuse", without the letter R, reflecting their upper class accent in which that letter was lightly pronounced, almost inaudibly. When this period ended, society took a more sober and modest turn.

Members of the ruling classes were also among the movement's leading figures, and the group heavily influenced the politics, clothing, and arts of the period. They emerged from the muscadins, a term for dandyish anti-Jacobin street gangs in Paris from 1793 (Note: Jacobins stood for the centralised supposed far-left republic and its terrors, so included established rulers such as Robespierre) who were important politically for some two years; the terms are often used interchangeably, though the muscadins were of a lower social background, being largely middle-class.

== Social background ==
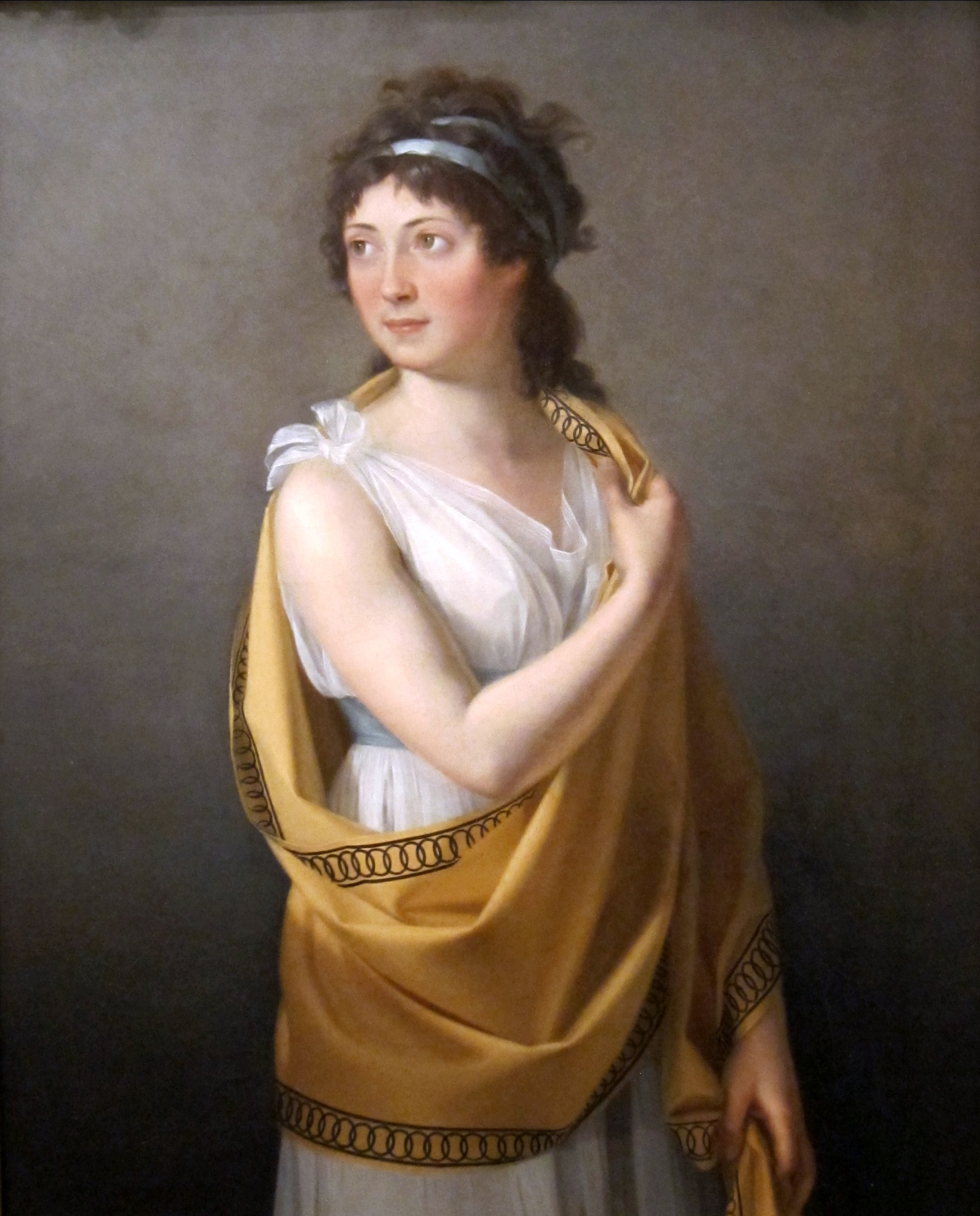
Portrait of a Lady, in Neoclassical style, c. 1799

Ornate carriages reappeared on the streets of Paris the day after the execution (28 July 1794) of Maximilien Robespierre, which brought an end to the Jacobin-era Committee of Public Safety and signaled the commencement of the Thermidorian Reaction. There were masters and servants once more in Paris, and the city erupted in a furor of pleasure-seeking and entertainment. Theaters thrived, and popular music satirized the excesses of the Revolution. One popular song of the period called on the French people to "share my horror" and to send "these drinkers of human blood" back amongst the monsters from which they had sprung. Its lyrics rejoiced that "your tormentors finally grow pale at the tardy dawn of vengeance".

Although it has been said that many public balls were bals des victimes at which young aristocrats who had lost loved ones to the guillotine danced in mourning dress or wore black armbands, greeting one another with violent movements of the head as if in decapitation, this comes from a misreading of sources. A ball held at the Hôtel Thellusson on the rue de Provence in the 9th arrondissement of Paris restricted its guest list to the grown children of the guillotined.

== Clothing and fashion ==
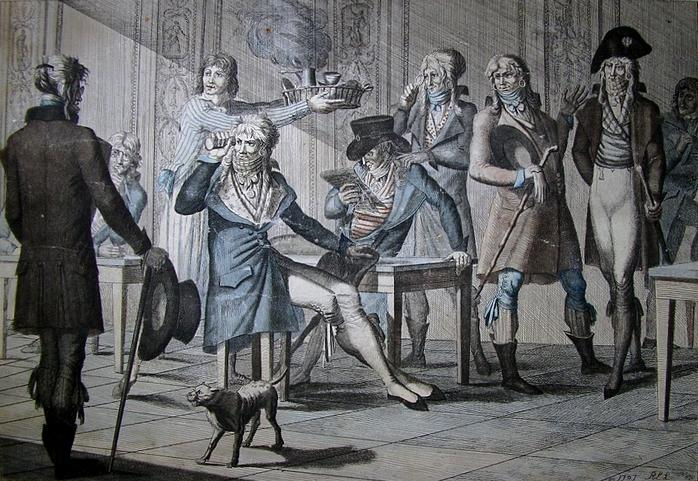
Cafe des Incroyables, 1797

The Merveilleuses scandalized Paris with dresses and tunics modeled after the ancient Greeks and Romans, cut of light or even transparent linen and gauze. In some caricaturized representations, the gowns were said to have been dampened in order to further cling to the figure, although this did not happen in real life. They were fond of wigs, often choosing blonde because the Paris Commune had banned blonde wigs, but they also wore them in black, blue, and green. Enormous hats, short curls like those on Roman busts, and Greek-style sandals were the rage. The sandals tied above the ankle with crossed ribbons or strings of pearls. Exotic and expensive scents fabricated by perfume houses like Parfums Lubin were worn both for style and as indicators of social station. Thérésa Tallien, known as "Our Lady of Thermidor", wore expensive rings on the toes of her bare feet and gold circlets on her legs.

The Incroyables wore eccentric outfits: large earrings, green jackets, wide trousers, huge neckties, thick glasses, and hats topped by "dog ears", their hair falling on their ears. Their musk-based fragrances earned the derogatory nickname muscadins for them and their immediate predecessors, a more middle-class group of anti-Jacobins. They wore bicorne hats and carried distinctive knobbled bludgeons or canes, which they referred to as their "executive power." Hair was often shoulder-length, sometimes pulled up in the back with a comb to imitate the hairstyles of the condemned. Some sported large monocles. They frequently affected a lisp, allegedly to avoid the letter "R" as in revolution, and sometimes a stooped, hunchbacked posture or slouch, as caricatured in numerous cartoons of the time.

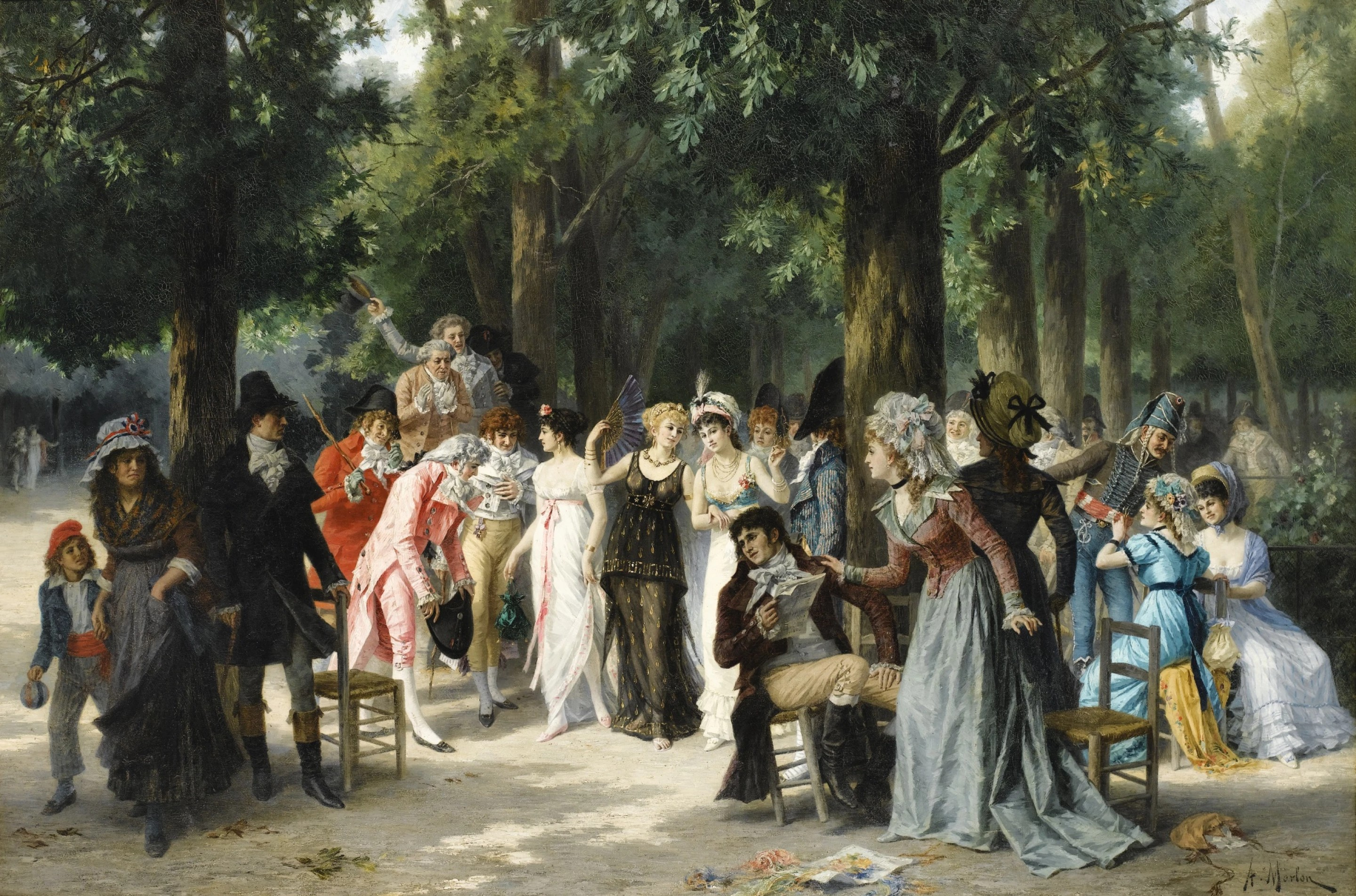
Painting of the three glamorous and eyebrow-raising Parisian socialites, the merveilleuses Thérésa Tallien, Juliette Récamier and Joséphine de Beauharnais.

In addition to Madame Tallien, famous Merveilleuses included Mademoiselle Lange, Juliette Récamier, and two very popular Créoles: Fortunée Hamelin and Hortense de Beauharnais. Hortense, a daughter of the Empress Josephine, married Louis Bonaparte and became the mother of Napoleon III. Fortunée was not born rich, but she became famous for her salons and her string of prominent lovers. Parisian society compared Germaine de Staël and Mme Raguet to Minerva and Juno and named their garments for Roman deities: gowns were styled Flora or Diana, and tunics were styled à la Ceres or Minerva.

The leading Incroyable, Paul François Jean Nicolas, vicomte de Barras, was one of five directors who ran the Republic of France and gave the period its name. He hosted luxurious feasts attended by royalists, repentant Jacobins, ladies, and courtesans. Since divorce was now legal, sexuality was looser than in the past. However, de Barras' reputation for immorality may have been a factor in his later overthrow, a coup that brought the French Consulate to power and paved the way for Napoleon Bonaparte.

== Representation in the arts ==
The fictional nouveau riche social climber Madame Angot, awkwardly wearing ridiculous Greek clothing, parodied the Merveilleuses in many plays of the period. Carl Vernet's caricatures of the wardrobes of the Incroyables and Merveilleuses met with contemporary popular success.

The designer Vivienne Westwood was influenced by the incroyables and merveilleuses.

=== Images of the period ===
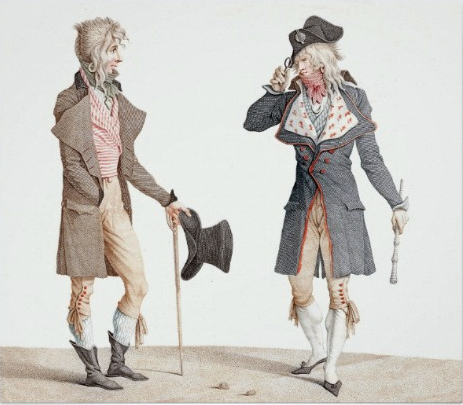
Painting Un Incroyable, by Carle Vernet, perhaps the first image of a top hat (1796)

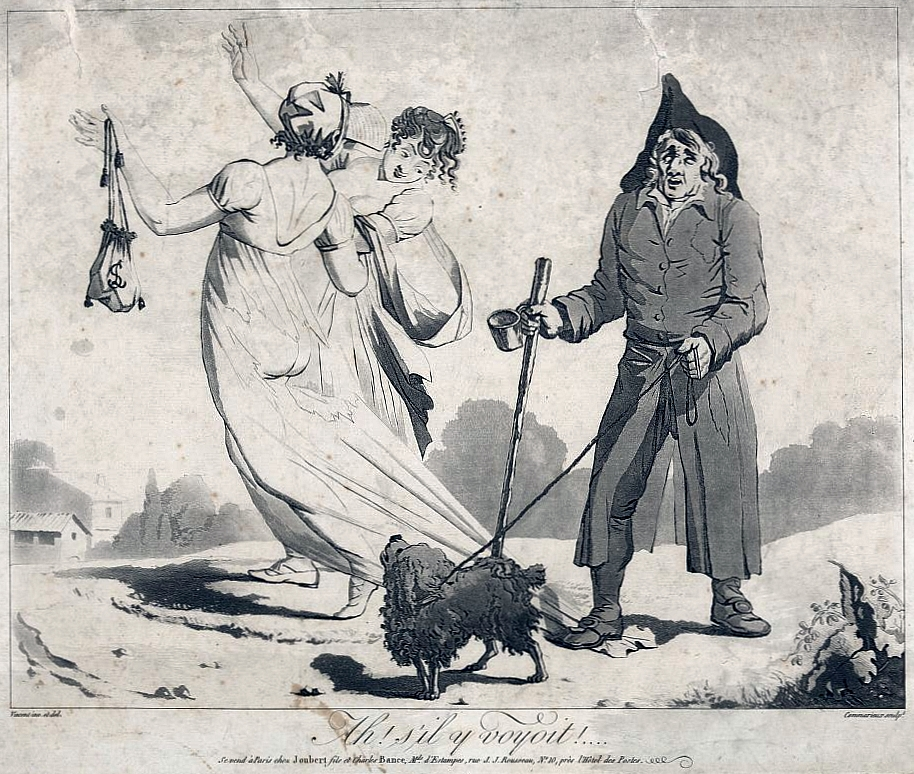
French caricature of Merveilleuse very thin dresses

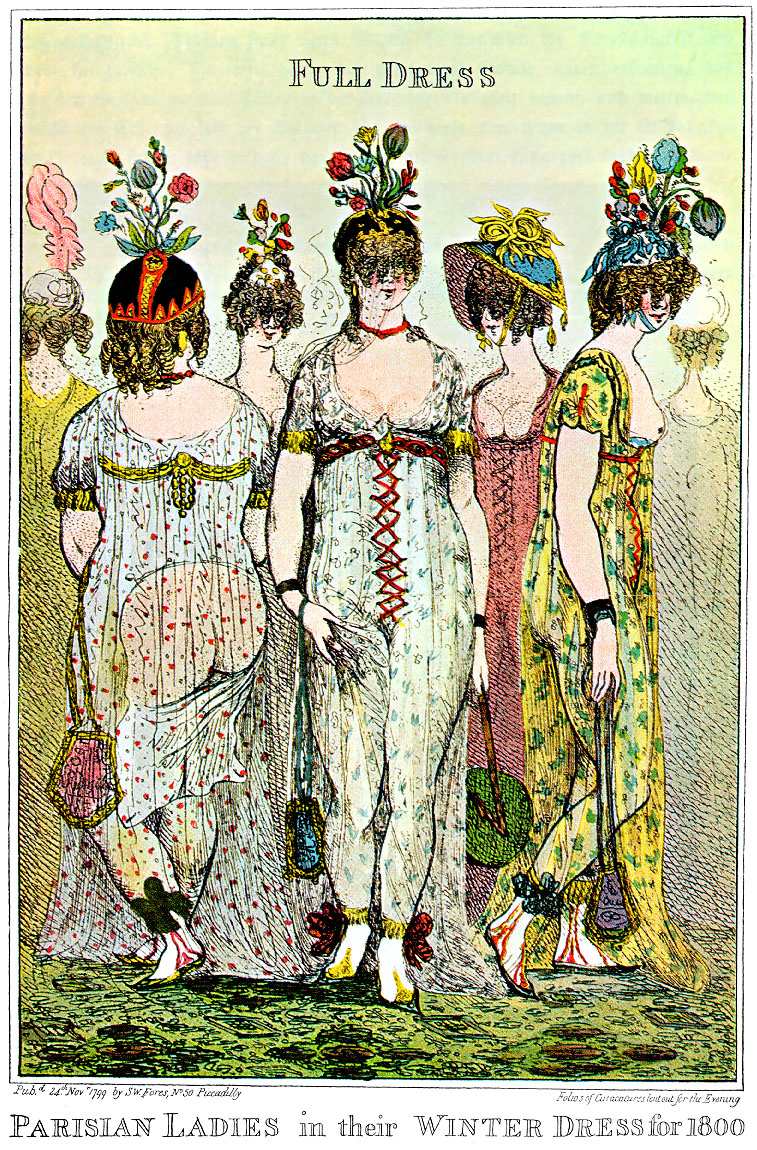
Paris Ladies in their Winter dress (1799). English caricature by Isaac Cruikshank

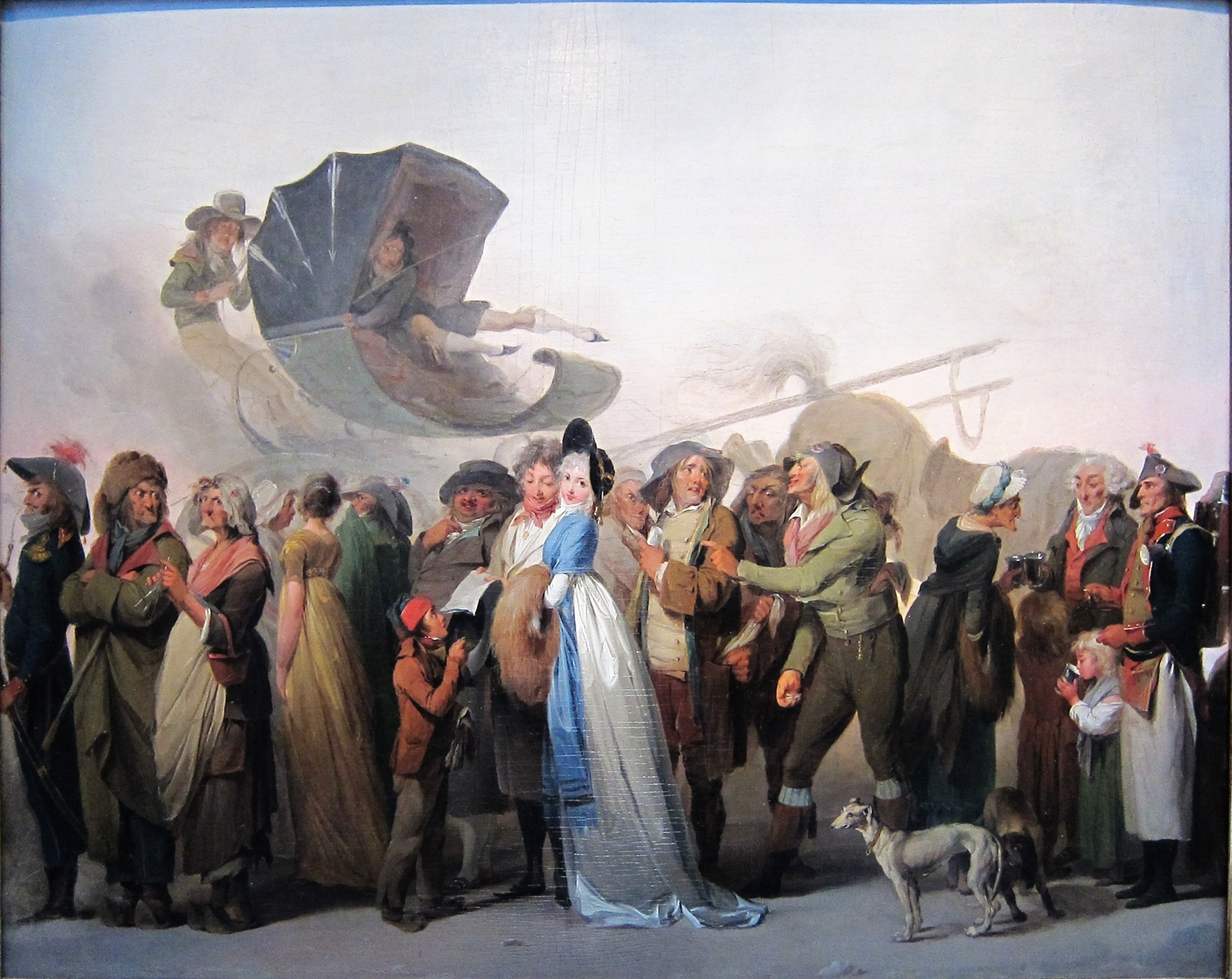
Boilly Incroyable parade

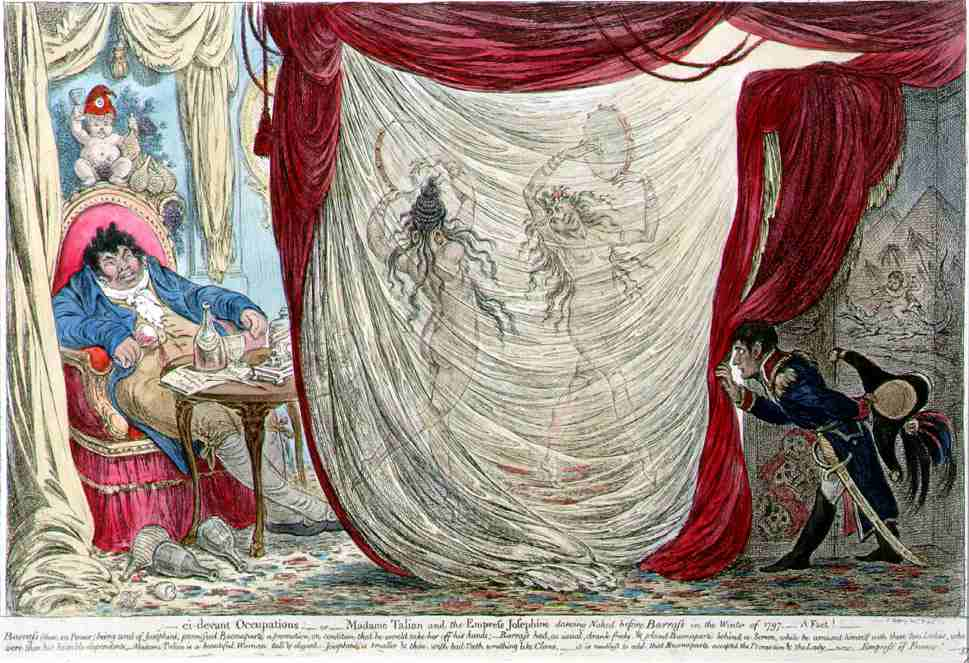
James Gillray's caricature of 1805. Paul Barras being entertained by the naked dancing of two wives of prominent men, Thérésa Tallien and Joséphine Bonaparte 1797

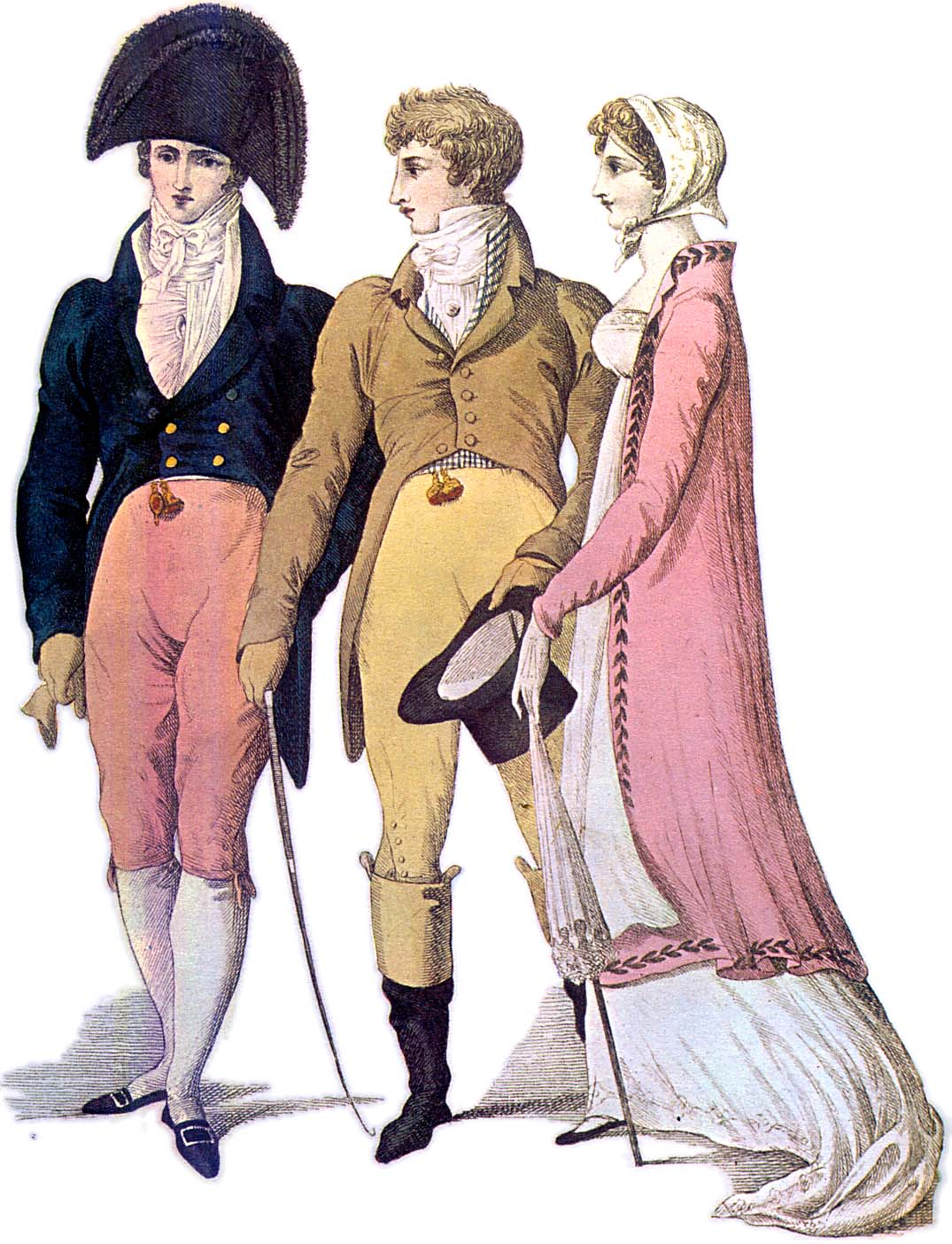
Full and half dress for April 1809

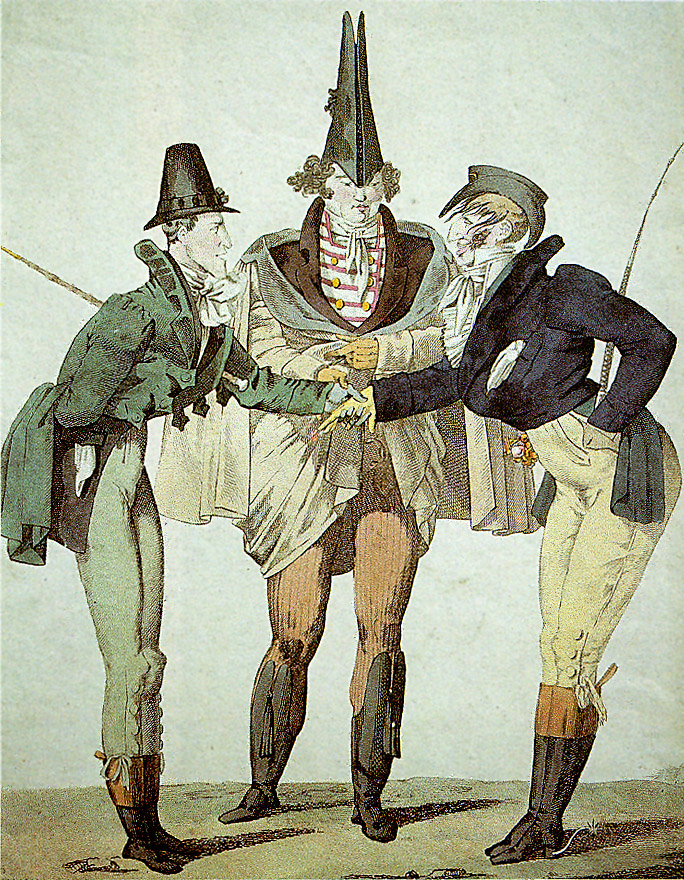
Les-Modernes-Incroyables, 1810

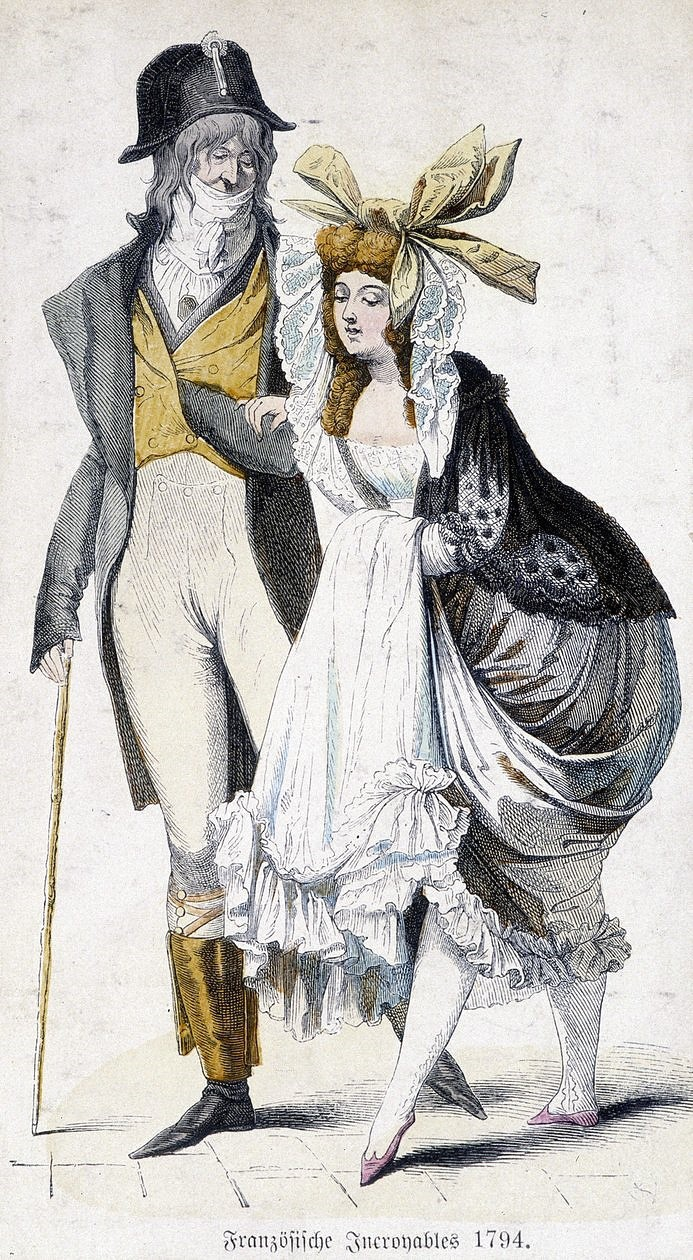
Les Incroyables

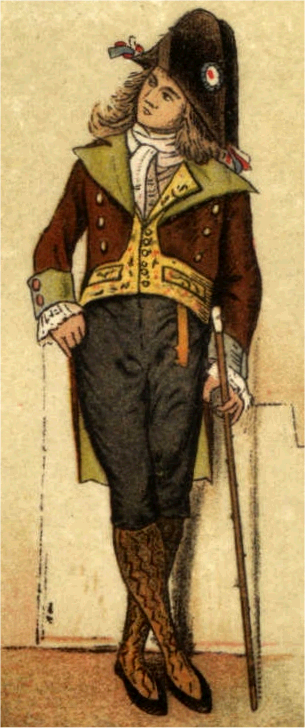
French dandy

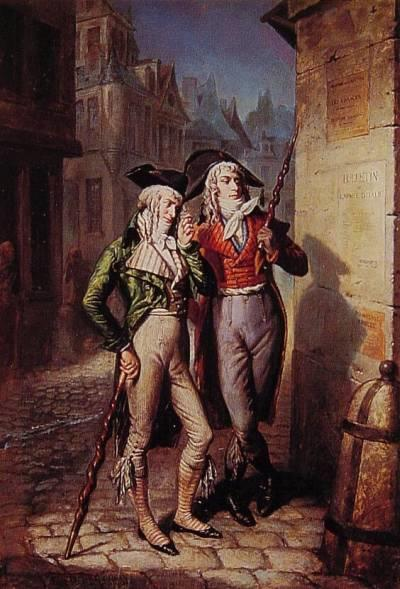
Les Incroyables (Muscadins)

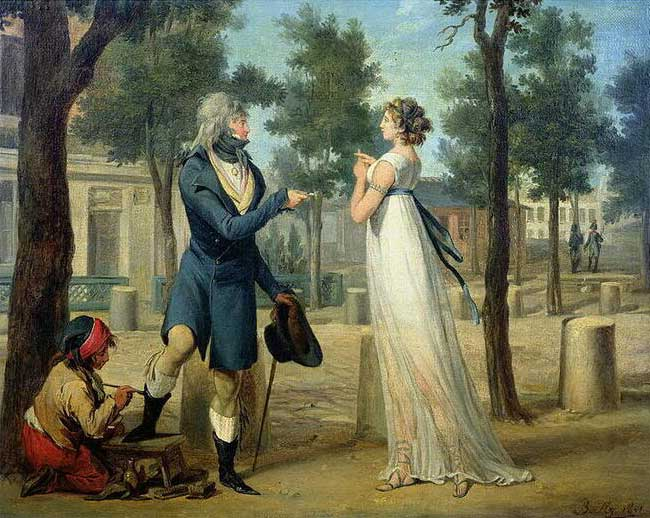
Point de Convention c. 1797
People associated with Incroyables and Merveilleuses

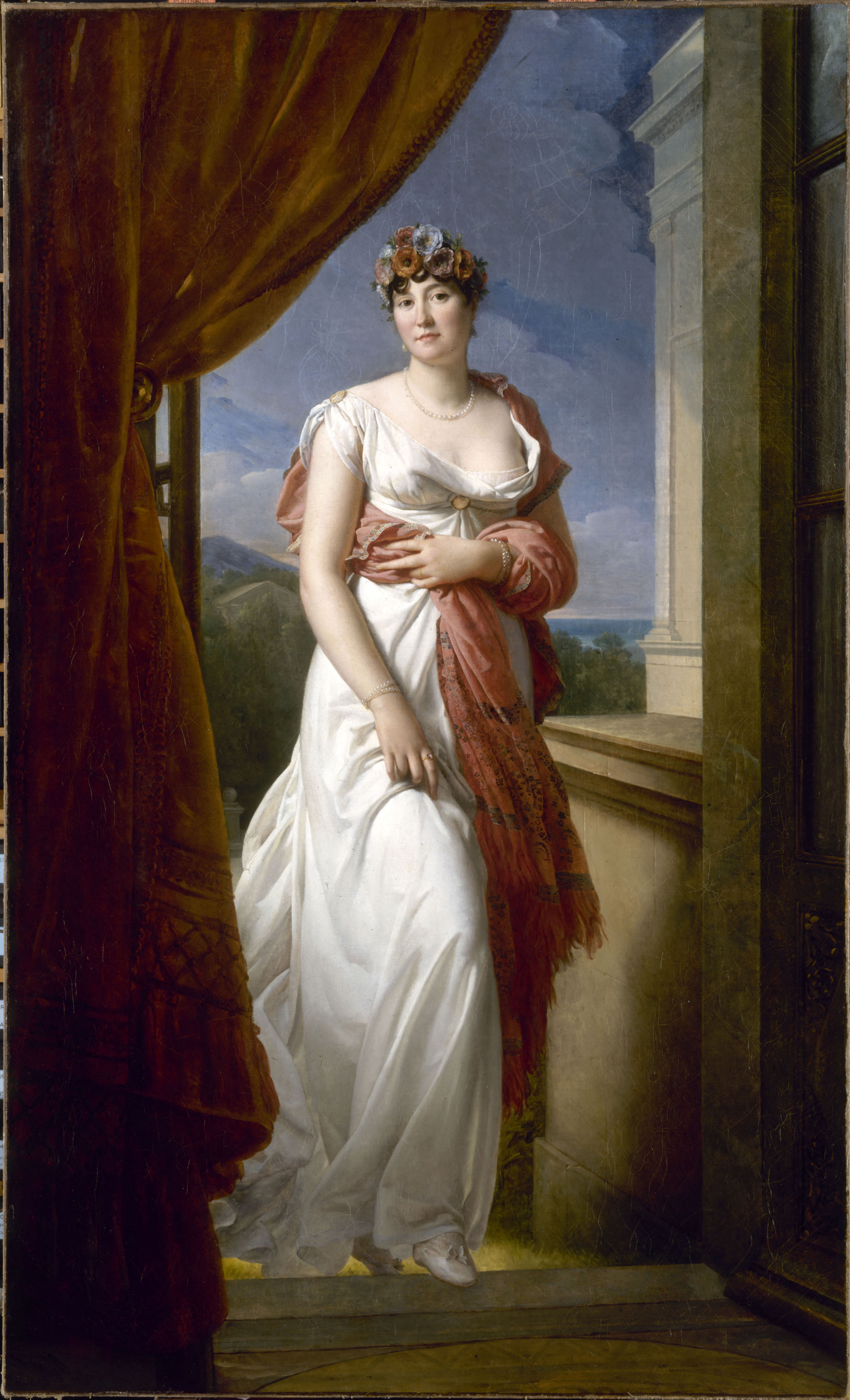
Madame Tallien

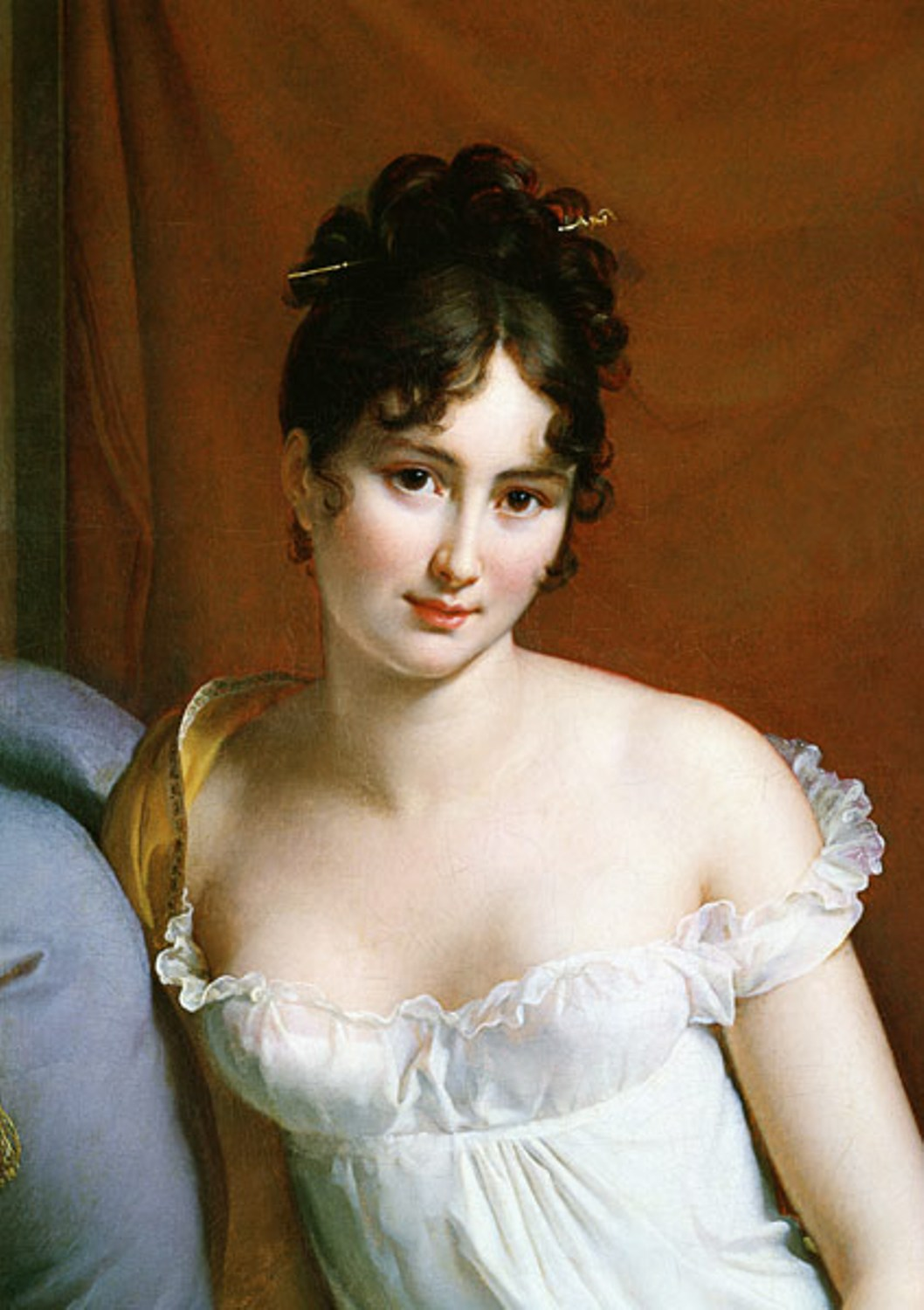
Juliette Récamier (1777–1849)

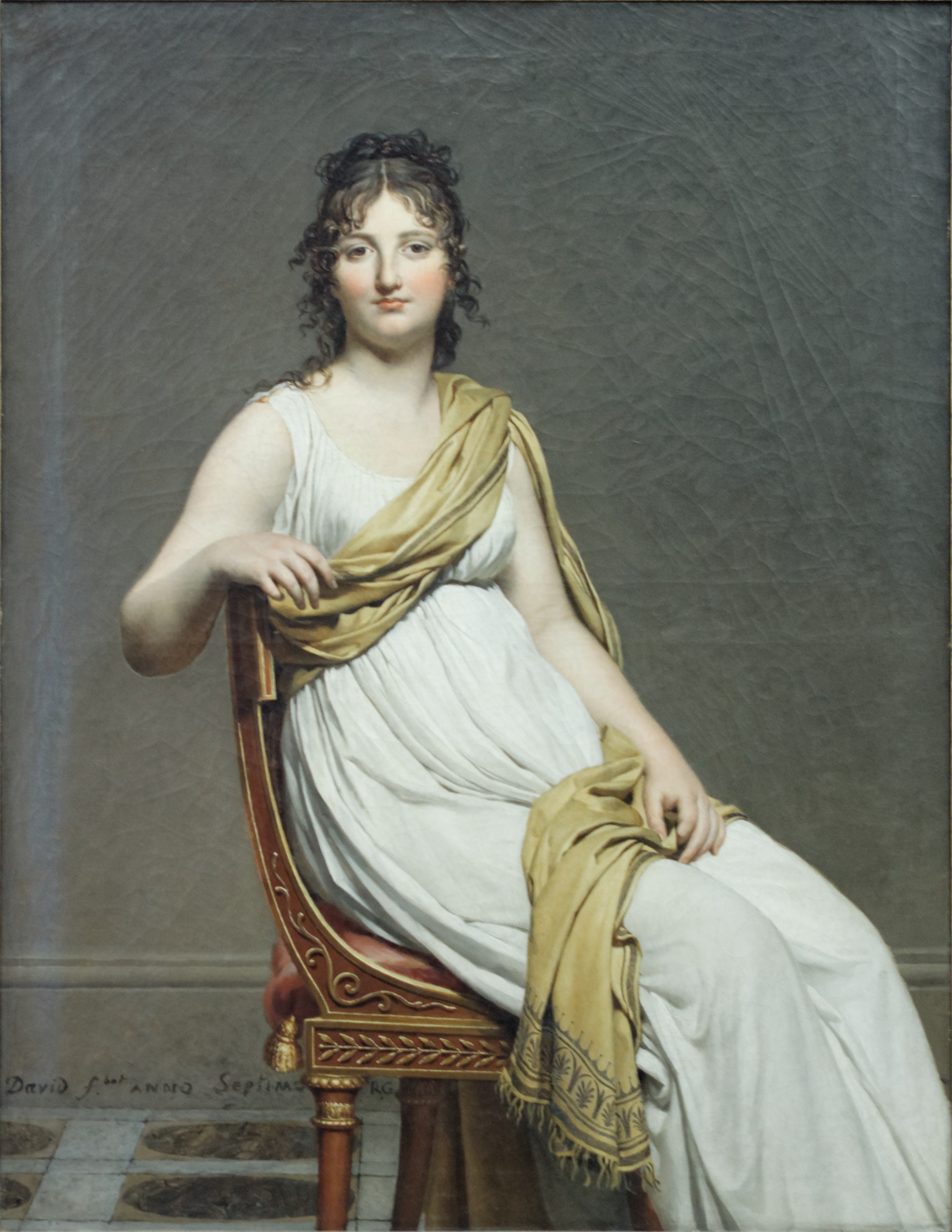
Portrait de Madame de Verninac

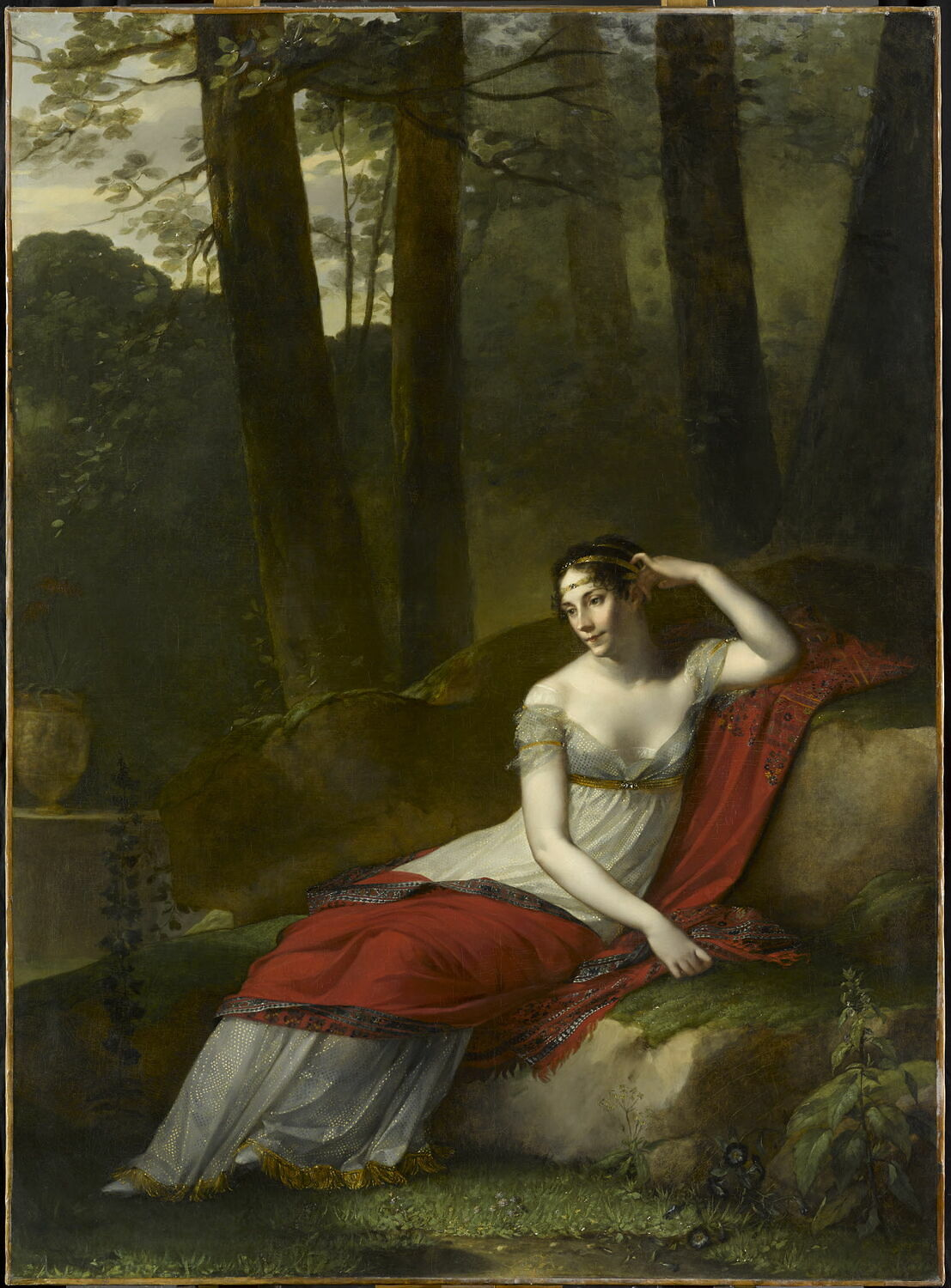
Josephine de Beauharnais

== Other meanings ==
- Incroyable was an 18th-century French nickname for a yo-yo, then a fashionable toy.

== See also ==
- 1795–1820 in fashion
- 1800s (decade)
- Ci-devant
- Dandy
- La fille de Madame Angot
- Jean-Lambert Tallien
- Théâtre de Paris

== Bibliography ==
- Barras, Paul; Mémoires de Barras, membre du Directoire (1895), Hachette, 1896
- Clarke, Joseph; Commemorating the Dead in Revolutionary France: Revolution and Remembrance, 1789–1799; Cambridge University Press, 2007.
- André Gaillot, ed. (1911) Une ancienne muscadine, Fortunée Hamelin: lettres inédites 1839–1851, Émile-Paul, 1911
