= Great Sewer =

Great Sewer may refer to:

- Cloaca Maxima (Great Sewer in Latin), the main sewer in Ancient Rome
- Menilmontant brook, a small river in Paris (France) used as the great sewer from the 16h to the 19th century
