= Muscadin =

Member of counter-revolutionary mobs in the French Revolution

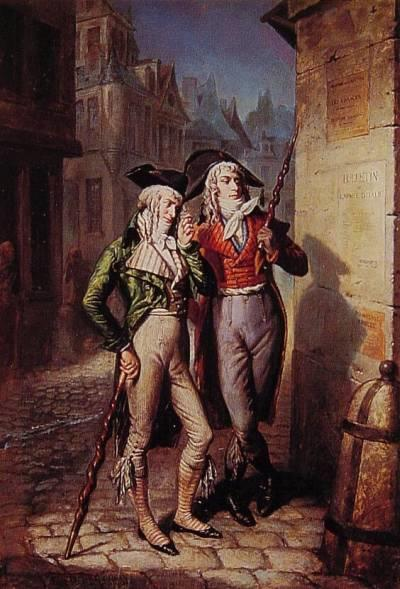
Two Muscadins, or Incroyables, in 1795, carrying their "constitutions"

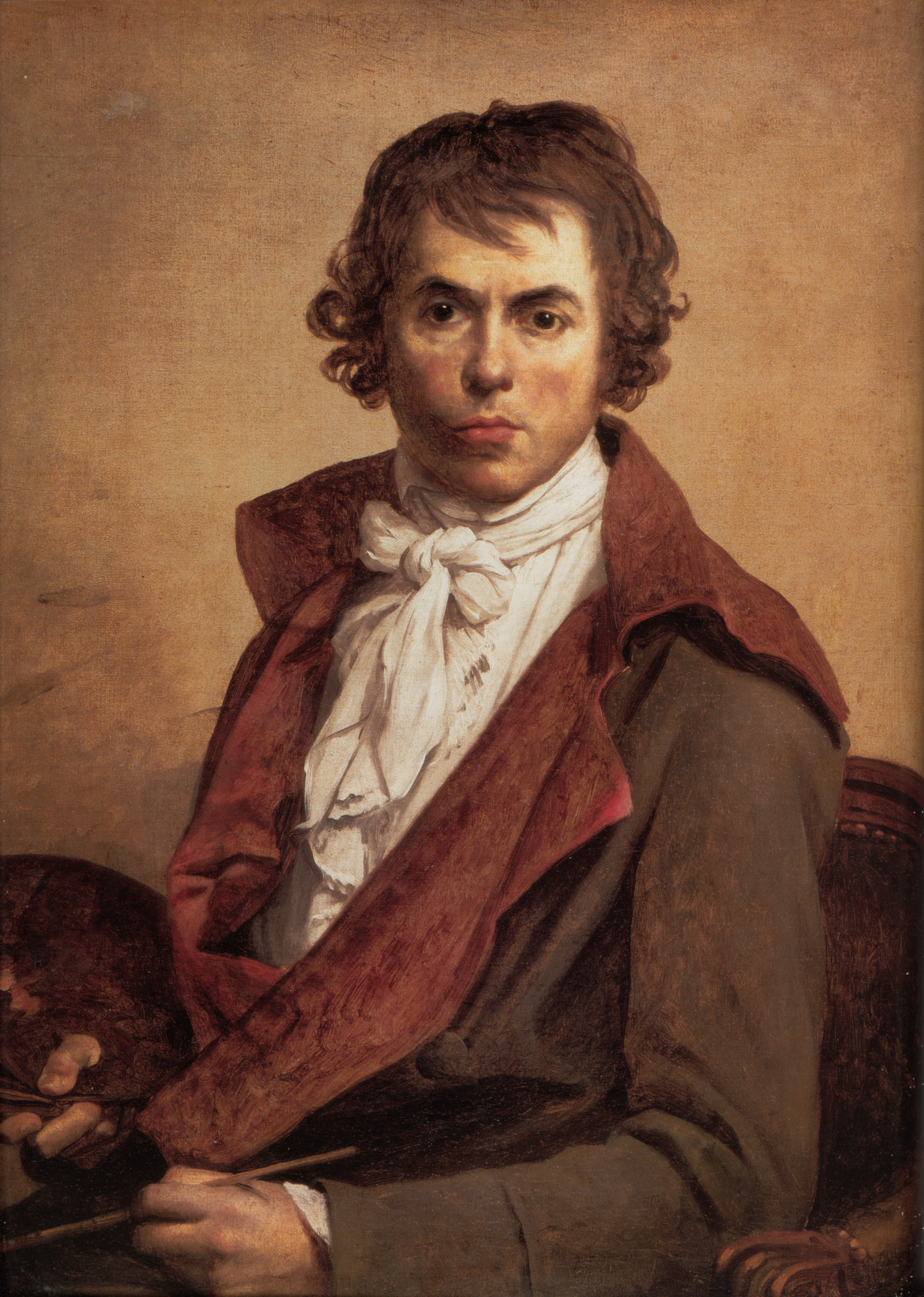
The Jacobin Jacques-Louis David; self-portrait in jail in 1794

The term Muscadin (French: [myskadɛ̃]), meaning "wearing musk perfume", came to refer to mobs of young men, relatively well-off and dressed in a dandyish manner, who were the street fighters of the Thermidorian Reaction in Paris in the French Revolution (1789–1799). After the coup against Robespierre and the Jacobins of 9 Thermidor Year II (27 July 1794), they took on the remaining Jacobins and sans-culottes, and largely succeeded in suppressing them over the next year or two. In prints they are often seen carrying large wooden clubs, which they liked to call "constitutions". They were supposedly organized by the politician and journalist Louis-Marie Stanislas Fréron, and eventually numbered 2,000–3,000. They, in fact, seem to have mostly consisted of the lower middle classes, the sons of "minor officials and small shopkeepers", and were quietly encouraged by the shaky new government, who had good reason to fear Jacobin mobs, and wider unrest as the hard winter of 1794–95 saw increasing hunger among the Parisian working class. The Muscadins are considered to be part of the First White Terror in response to the preceding Reign of Terror of the Jacobins.

These jeunesse dorée ("Gilded Youth") came to have a considerable influence on the National Convention, and after the Jacobin revolt of 12 Germinal, Year III (April 1, 1795), are held to have forced the arrest of the four main "ringleaders" remaining from the Jacobin regime: Bertrand Barère, Jacques-Louis David, Jean-Marie Collot d'Herbois and Jacques Nicolas Billaud-Varenne, who were all threatened with transportation to French Guiana (though only the latter two were eventually sent there). After they had succeeded in suppressing the sans-culottes, their usefulness to the government was over, and they began to pose a threat. After the "whiff of grapeshot" in the crisis of 13 Vendémiaire, in October 1795, they ceased to be a significant factor in Parisian politics.

== The term ==
The term "Muscadin" existed well before the post-Thermidor gangs, who are also referred to as the "jeunesse dorée" ("gilded youth") or simply les jeunes gens ("the young people"). The term had long been current in Lyon, used by the working class of "white-collar" domestic servants, shop boys and clerks of the merchants. An element of effeminacy was implied. In 1789, at the start of the Revolution, a royalist militia was raised in Lyon, with the encouragement of the city elite, and containing many of their employees, and their revolutionary opponents started to call them the "muscadins". Perfumed or not, they were an effective military force in the area for nearly a year, before being disbanded after it was clear that national events had overtaken them. Their equipment, and nickname, were transferred to the local Garde Nationale, and when Lyon was besieged by Jacobin armies in 1793, the term became known in Paris.

In that year the term was used in the battle between the Jacobin publications Le Père Duchesne, written by Jacques Hébert, and Le Vieux Cordelier, written by Camille Desmoulins, with Hébert using it in criticising Desmoulins. The split among the Jacobins was to be resolved the next year by the execution of both men with many of their respective factions; in the meeting of the Committee of Public Safety that moved against the "Hébertistes" in March 1794, Barère complained that Muscadins, along with foreigners and deserters, were seen to "congregate at the theatre, dressed with ridiculous ostentation, and ... show themselves with dirty stockings, large moustaches, and long sabres, threatening the good citizens, and especially the people's representatives" – he saw them as supporting the ultra-radical "Hébertistes".

== Costume ==
The costumes of the Muscadins are less well-recorded than those of their successors, the Incroyables, but appear to have been similar to these. Characteristics include tightly-cut coats with extravagantly large lapels, typically in a different colour, with large and elaborately knotted cravats and perhaps sashes round the waist. Colours are bright and violently contrasting, with stripes very popular – perhaps a parody of the sans-culottes, for whom stripes were also characteristic. However, more muted versions of some of these characteristics can be seen in the self-portrait painted in jail in 1794 by Jacques-Louis David after the fall of the Jacobins; the Muscadins took to extremes elements of the shared fashions of the day. Their walking sticks, clubs or bludgeons are often thick twisted pieces of wood, perhaps artificially grown in that style; they are supposed to have referred to these as "constitutions".

== See also ==
- Incroyables
