= Parfums Lubin =

French perfume house

Lubin Paris
- Industry: Perfumes
- Founded: 1798; 228 years ago
- Headquarters: Paris, France
- Area served: Worldwide
- Products: Perfumes
- Website: Official website

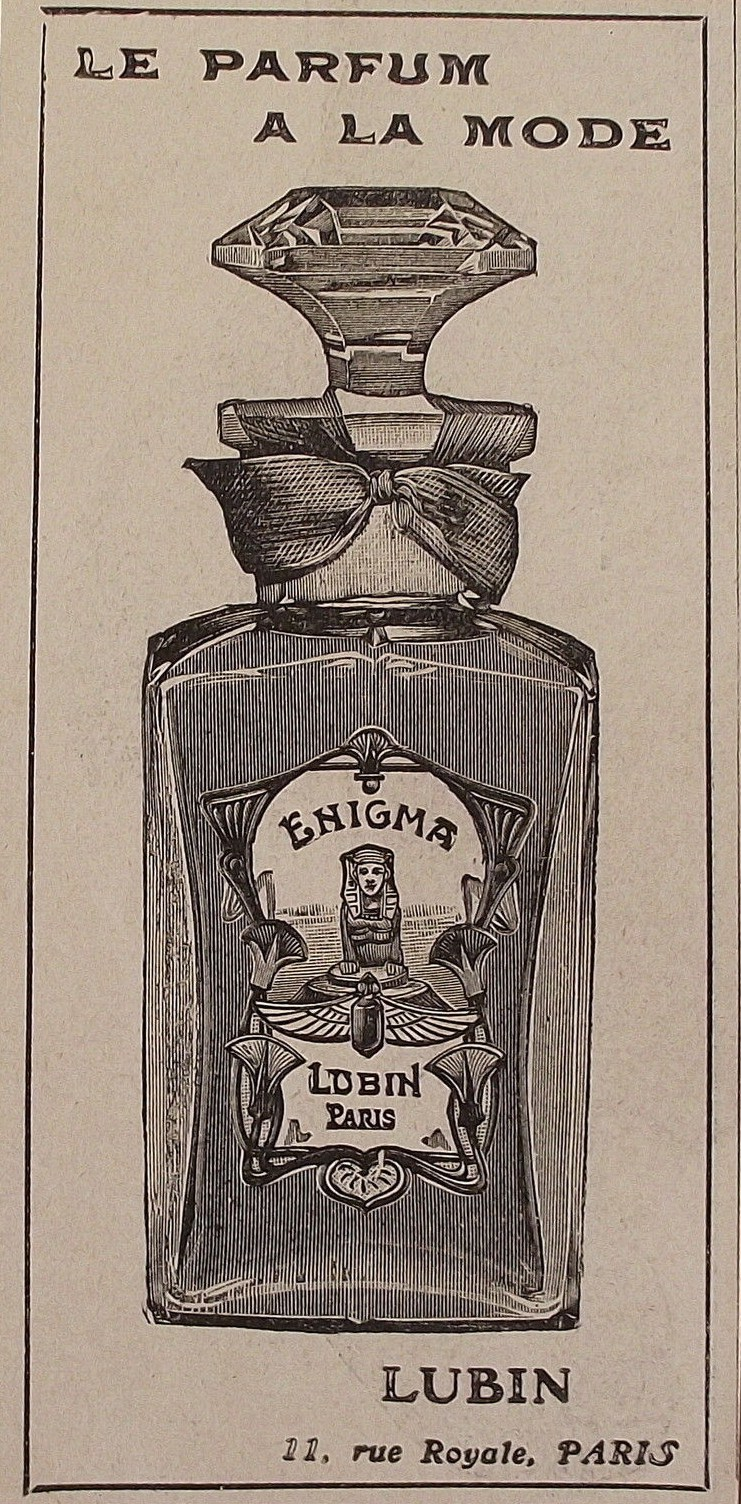
Advertisement for Enigma by Lubin in a 1900s periodical

Parfums Lubin is one of the oldest perfume houses in the world. Its early history is linked to the high society of the Napoleonic era, and its products became the imprimatur of haute couture, and indicators of fashion and social hierarchy.

== History ==
Pierre François Lubin founded the company in 1798 when he began supplying scented ribbons, rice powderballs and masks to "Les Merveilleuses", socially exulted women who frequented Thermidorian drawing rooms of Napoleonic France; and the "Incroyables", members of the subculture that mixed fashion and propaganda which emerged following the Reign of Terror that was the immediate aftermath of the French Revolution of 1789.

The fragrance won over the Imperial Court, and was worn by the likes of Joséphine and Pauline Bonaparte. When the Bourbons were restored, Lubin dedicated his fragrances to Queen Marie-Amelie. In 1821, Pierre François Lubin created Eau de Chypre for Alexander I of Russia. This perfume is considered one of the cornerstones of chypre perfumery. Eventually, Lubin's perfumes were worn by all the crowned heads of Europe, and were imported to America in 1830.

== Modern era ==
Lubin was still a major perfumery in the 1960s, under the helm of Paul Prot Jr, whose great-grandfather Felix Prot had taken over the House from its founder Pierre-François Lubin in 1844. The Prot family then decided to sell the company in 1969. In the 1970s, it became the property of French perfume house Roger & Gallet. In 1984, it was purchased by Mülhens, a German perfume house founded in Cologne in 1792. The Lubin perfume production was then moved to the Mülhens perfume factory in Bickendorf, near Cologne. In 1994, Mülhens was taken over by German haircare company Wella, who decided to part from Lubin at the end of the 20th century. The House of Lubin was taken over in the early 2000s by Gilles Thevenin, a former creative director at Guerlain. Thevenin gained the support of Laurent Prot, son of Paul Jr, the last family president of the House. Production was moved back to France in 2004.

Lubin perfumes are now produced in small quantities in the Loire valley, and distributed through a network of several hundred high-end retailers in about 30 countries. Still in private hands, the house of Lubin has a subsidiary company in New York City, Lubin North America, and one in London, Lubin Limited. Its boutique in Paris, settled in Saint Germain des Prés, retails more than 30 different perfumes. Its wares and antique documents can be found displayed in Musée international de la parfumerie in Grasse, France.

== Fragrances ==
Parfums Lubin fragrances include:

- Eau de Lubin (1798), by Pierre François Lubin
- Nuit de Longchamp (1935), by Marcel Prot and Paul Prot
- Idole Eau de Parfum (2011), by Olivia Giacobetti
