= Bals des victimes =

Purported social event after the Reign of Terror

The bals des victimes, or victims' balls, were balls that were said to have been put on by dancing societies after the Reign of Terror during the French Revolution. To be admitted to these societies and balls, one had to be a near relative of someone who had been guillotined during the Terror.

According to Ronald Schecter, the balls came to prominence after the downfall and death of Robespierre, supposedly first being held in early 1794 and first mentioned in popular writing in 1797. While anecdotal evidence attests to the balls' occurrence, and generations of French and non-French historians described them and accepted them as fact, some recent scholarship, citing a near-total lack of primary evidence, has argued that they may have been fabrications based on rumor.

In 2007, historian David A. Bell concluded that "[t]he bals des victimes... never took place—they were an invention of early nineteenth-century Romantic authors."

== Background ==
According to one source, they emerged as an idea of youths whose parents and other near relatives had gone to the guillotine, and to whom the revolution had now restored their relatives' confiscated property. Reveling in the return of fortune they established aristocratic, decadent balls open to themselves alone.

Descriptions of the balls' particulars vary, but the common thread is that they were a cathartic device in which the participants acted out the emotional impact of their relatives' executions and the social upheavals occurring as a result of the revolution. Many who described the balls, often generations afterwards, nevertheless found them a scandalous idea. Whether real or imagined, the very idea of the balls reflected the post-Terror generations' morbid fascination with the horror of the guillotine and the excesses of the French Revolution with its mass executions.

Those who attended the orgiastic balls reportedly wore mourning clothes or elaborate costumes with crepe armbands signifying mourning. Some accounts have both men and women wearing plain but scanty dress in the wake of the impoverishment of the Revolution, at least until the return of their fortunes at which time ball dress became highly elaborate. Others describe women, in the fashion of Merveilleuses, dressing scandalously in Greco-Roman attire, with their feet bare, in sandals, or adorned only by ribbons, a possible allusion to the fact that women often went barefoot to the guillotine. The style of dress at such a ball was known by some as the "costume à la victime." Women, and by some accounts men too, wore a red ribbon or string around their necks at the point of a guillotine blade's impact. Both men and women attending the balls were said to have worn or cut their hair in a fashion that bared their necks in a manner reflecting the haircut given the victim by the executioner, women often using a comb known as a cadenette to achieve this fashion. According to some, this was the origin of the feminine hairstyle known as the "coiffure à la victime" or more popularly the "coiffure à la Titus", or (in England) "à la guillotine". Some sources state that a woman sporting this hairstyle sometimes wore a red shawl or throat ribbon even when not attending a bal des victimes.

In another macabre touch, instead of a graceful bow or bob of the head to one's dancing partner, a man who attended a bal des victimes would jerk his head sharply downwards in imitation of the moment of decapitation. Some sources suggest that women, too, adopted this salutation.

== Social and cultural context ==
The twenty-four months from July, 1794, to July, 1796, placed enormous pressures on the people of France and their government. These pressures included civil wars in western France, wars with most of Europe, a famine in 1795, a new constitution in 1795, economic collapse, and two insurrections in Paris - one in July of 1794 to end the terror, and a second in the fall of 1795 by royalists hostile to the revolutionary government and 1795 constitution. The authorities in Paris were extremely anxious about a second royalist uprising within the city throughout 1796.

The restrictions placed upon balls and gatherings in Paris in early 1797 - banning masks, etc. were an expression of this concern. Thus, we need to see these bals des victimes initially, at least, as political and social gatherings, where royalists and those who had suffered under the terror could gather together, support one another, and cohere as a political and social force. The imposition of an early curfew forced hosts and guests to remain within the ball hall after 10:30. Rumors of what occurred within the walls naturally emerged from the ranks of the excluded.

== Historicity ==
=== Henry Swinburne ===
In a 2022 article in the self-published Gericault Life Magazine Paul Harper assembled a list of contemporary press reports, (some of which are cited here) and the letters of Henry Swinburne as evidence that the bals des victimes did indeed take place. (Updated on May 18, 2026 to include David A. Bell's favorable response.) Henry Swinburne was based in Paris from September 1796 to December 1797, as a commissioner tasked with arranging prisoner exchanges between England and France. A collection of his letters to his family from this period, published posthumously in 1841, contain several references relevant to the subject of the bals des victimes.

Yesterday Madame de Gontaut gave as fine a ball as ever was given in days of yore: three hundred of the company had lost near relations by the guillotine! Some of the men there danced with their hats on, and with red heels.

— Letter dated 18 January 1797.

There is a “bal abonné,” with Robert Dillon at the head, called "Les restes de la Guillotine”. None are admitted but femmes presentées, and fils de pendus.
(Editor's note: Femmes presentées — those who had been presented at court prior to the revolution; fils de pendus — sons of those who had perished by the lantern, guillotine, &c. A more painful instance of French levity can scarcely be adduced.)

— Letter dated 12 February 1797.

=== 1797 Press Reports ===
Le Tableau de Paris nous assure que pour assister aux bals organisés par Madame Valence, il fallait avoir des parents qui avaient été guillotinés : le même journaliste dit que Madame Lameth organise des danses pour les rentiers. Les bals de Valence sont appelés les bals des victimes, tandis que ceux de Lameth sont appelés les bals des pauvres. On voit que les Français se réjouissent de tout.
Le Tableau de Paris assures us that in order to attend the balls organised by Madame Valence, one had to have parents who had been guillotined: the same journalist says that Madame Lameth organises dances for rentiers. Valence's balls are called the balls of the victims, while Lameth's are called the balls of the poor. We can see that the French rejoice in everything.

— L'Ami de la Patrie, 4 February 1797

Qui croirait qu'il y eut autrefois un bal parisien appelé le Bal des Victimes ? Il fallait avoir perdu un frère, un père ou une mère pour être admis. O esprits de tant d'âmes malheureuses ! Vous vous êtes consolés d'avoir perdu la vie en pensant que votre mort serait utile à votre pays ; hélas ! Quel désespoir vous auriez ressenti si vous aviez prévu que votre condamnation à mort servirait de billet d'entrée à votre femme ou à votre fille pour concourir à un bal pour le prix de l'ornement, et peut-être celui de la débauche ! Fous ! Ils peuvent à leur tour devenir des victimes ; leurs enfants danseront autour de leurs cercueils, et chaque génération périra dans la tombe, oubliée par celle qui doit suivre.
Who would believe that there was once a Parisian ball called the Bal des Victimes? One had to have lost a brother, father or mother to be admitted. O spirits of so many unhappy souls! You consoled yourselves for having lost your lives by thinking that your death would be useful to your country; alas! What despair you would have felt if you had foreseen that your death sentence would serve as an entry ticket for your wife or daughter to compete in a ball for the prize of adornment, and perhaps that of debauchery! Fools! They may in turn become victims; their children will dance around their coffins, and each generation will perish in the grave, forgotten by the one that follows.

— La Quotidienne, 5 March 1797

La Quotidienne nous apprend qu'il y avait à Paris un bal appelé le bal des victimes. Pour être admis à y danser, il fallait avoir perdu son père, sa mère ou son frère dans la révolution. La Quotidienne n'aurait pas présenté comme un fait ce qui n'est que du sarcasme.
La Quotidienne tells us that there was a ball in Paris called the victims' ball. To be admitted to dance there, you had to have lost your father, mother or brother in the revolution. La Quotidienne should not have presented what is merely sarcasm as fact.

— Le Censeur des Journaux, 8 March 1797

1797 Journal de Paris, 28 Pluviôse An V (16 February, 1797) “Bureau Central du Canton de Paris. Pour prévenir les atteintes que les deguissements peuvent porter à la sureté publique, le bureau central... interdit les bals de nuit passé dix heures & demie, les déguissemens, les travestissemens & l’usage des masques. Les contrevenans seront arrêtés, & traduits devant les officiers de police.”

The second press report in Le Censeur announces that "balls had to end by 10:30 pm under penalty of prosecution and that those wearing masks, disguises, or cross-dressing are subject to arrest."

The first press reports in L'Ami may be the original media discussion of the "bals des victimes." The 10:30 curfew cited in Le Censeur compelled/invited guests to remain within the ball hall overnight. Late-night balls and parties were common across Europe. The only distinction in Paris was that individuals could not leave a ball until early in the morning.

== See also ==
- Ci-devant
- The French Revolution: A History
- Hôtel Thellusson, where bals des victimes were organized
- Incroyables and Merveilleuses
- Jules Michelet
- Thermidorian Reaction
