= Menilmontant brook =

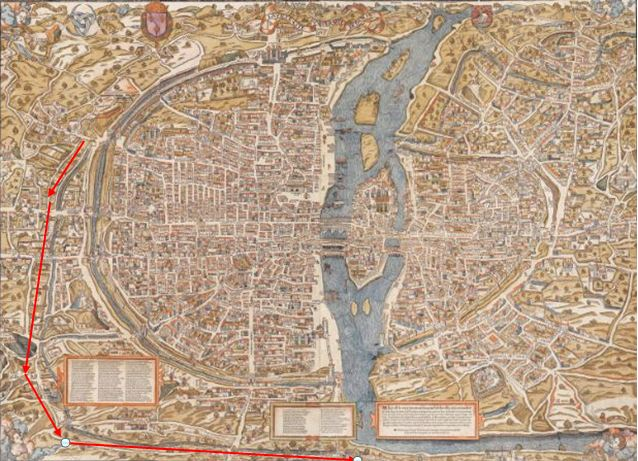
- Menilmontant brook (red arrows) on a map of Paris in 1550

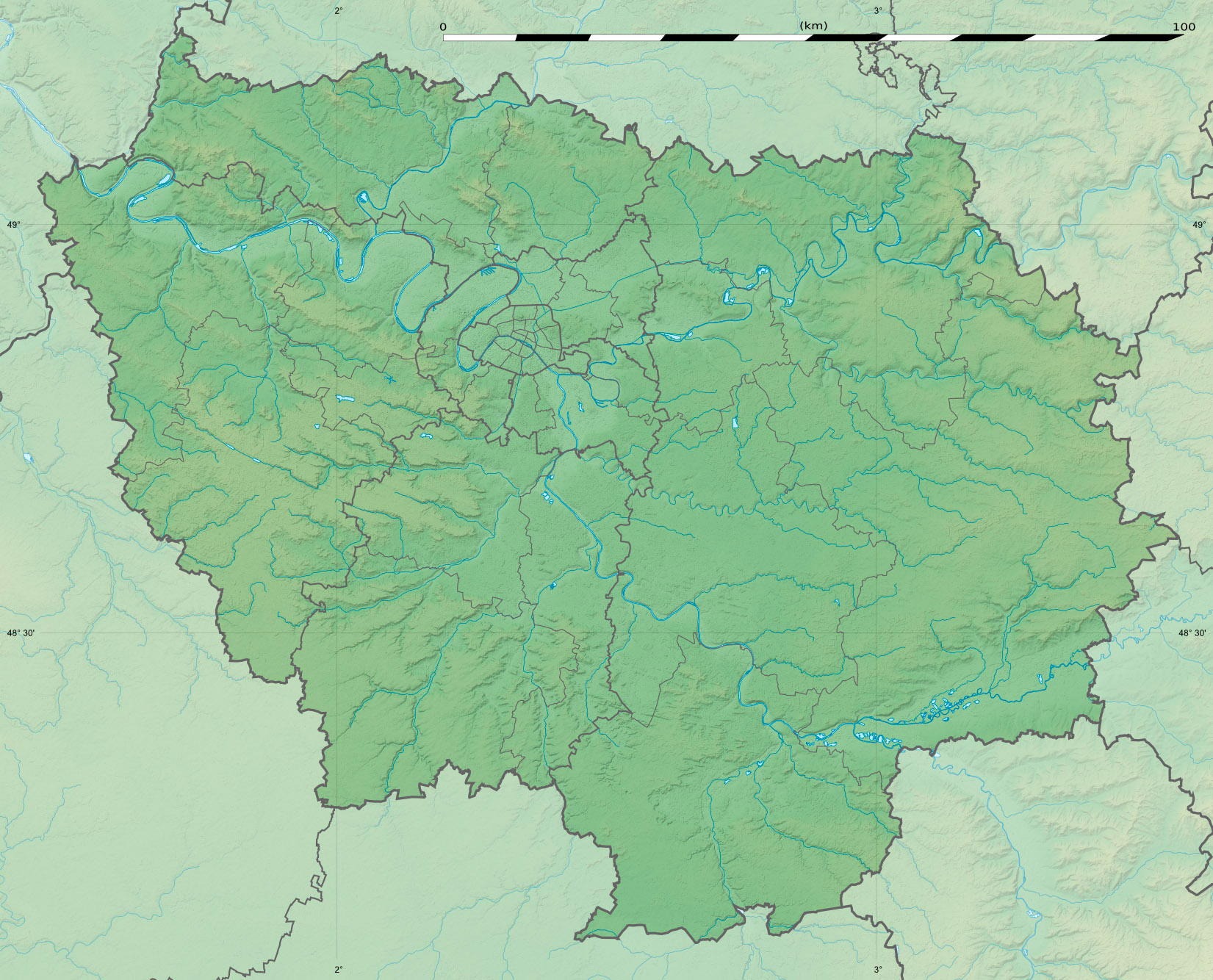
- Location within France Location within Île-de-France (region)

Location
- Country: France

Physical characteristics
- Source
  - location: Île-de-France
- Mouth
  - location: Seine
  - coordinates: 48°51′26″N 2°17′09″E
- Length: 8 km (5.0 mi)

Basin features
- Progression: Seine→ English Channel

The Menilmontant brook is an old and small river in Paris.

== The brook ==
Originally, the brook originated from several small creeks descending from the hills of Ménilmontant, Belleville, Montmartre, Pre-Saint-Gervais. It was bypassing the hill of Ménilmontant before sending itself into the Seine River at the level of the present Bassin de l'Arsenal, upstream Paris.

This brook is mentioned for the first time in a charter given by the king of France Dagobert I, in 629, for the establishment of a fair.

== The Great Sewer ==
With the increase of the population of Paris, the evacuation of the waste water takes more and more importance. In the 16th century, the brook was channeled and transformed into sewer: the Grand Égout (Great Sewer). Its course was modified and lengthened, forming a large loop around the city limits. It began at the site of the present Place de la Republique, and then moved westward by the rue du Château-d'Eau, the rue des Petites-Écuries, the rue Richer, the Rue de Provence, the rue Roquépine, the rue de Penthièvre, the rue du Colisée and the rue Marbeuf and finally the Seine river where it ended, between the pont de l'Alma and the Place du Trocadéro.

In the 1760s, Jean-Joseph de Laborde covered the Great Sewer for reasons of public health. It is notably the Rue de Provence with an East-West route that covers the Great Sewer and makes disappear the small pont d'Arcans (Arcans bridge). This bridge allowed to cross the Grand Sewer at approximate level of the rue de la Chaussée-d'Antin today.

On the other hand, Jean-Joseph de Laborde obtained the right to subdivide and sell the land he owned on rue de Provence and rue d'Artois, now rue Laffitte.

Totally filled during the extension of the city, the Menilmontant brook finally disappeared completely. It is found, however, in the name of the street Passage du Ruisseau-de-Ménilmontant which means 'passage of the Menilmontant brook', located in the 20th arrondissement of Paris.

== Other pages ==
- Bièvre (river)
