= Hôtel Thellusson =

Coordinates: 48°52′28.85″N 2°20′17.75″E

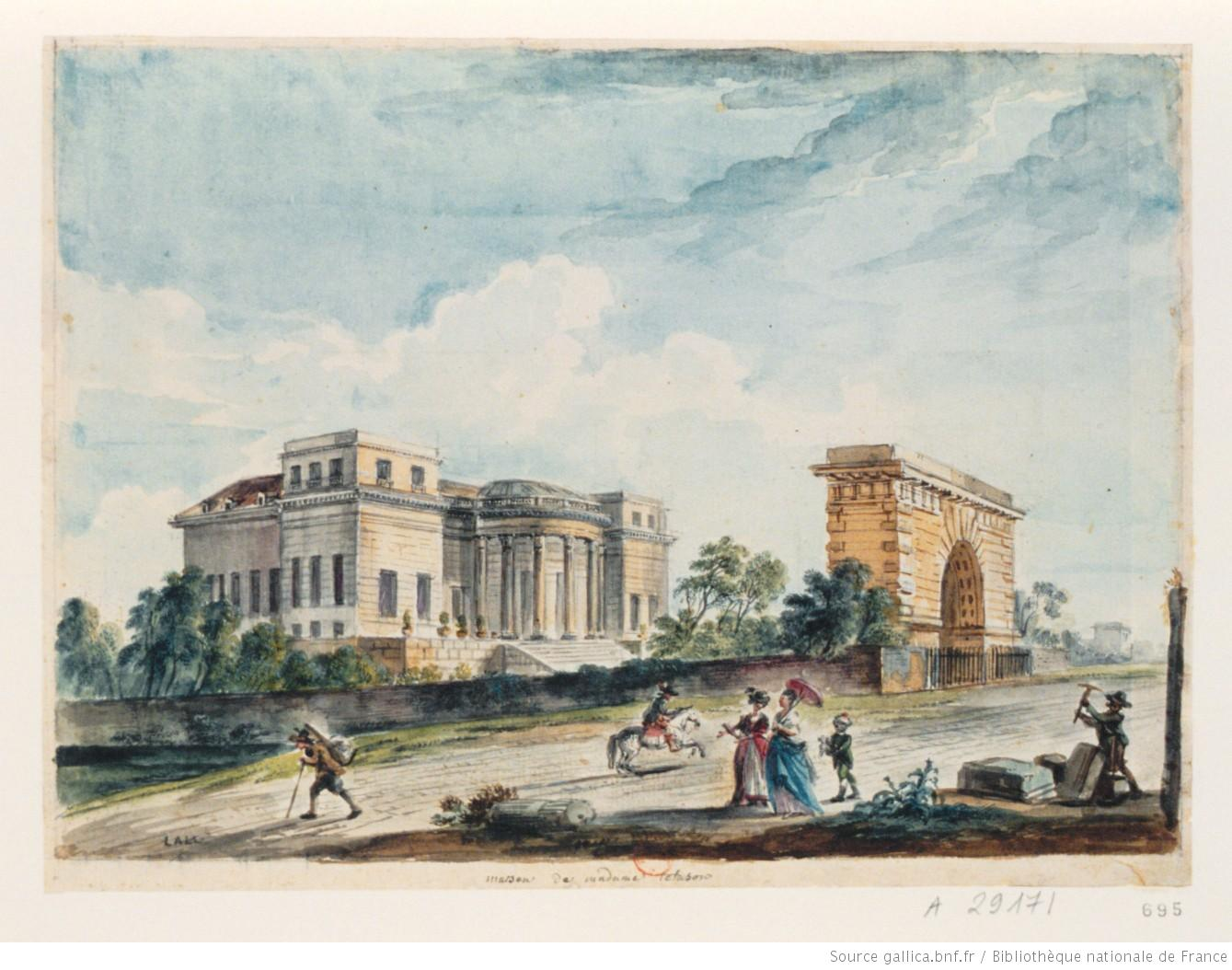
Jean-Baptiste Lallemand : The Hôtel de Thellusson in Paris

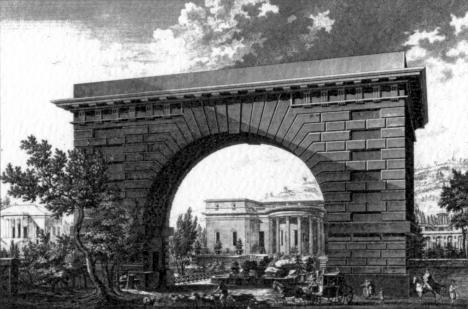
Hôtel entrance

The Hôtel Thellusson was a luxurious hôtel particulier located in Paris, France, built in 1778 by Claude-Nicolas Ledoux for Marie-Jeanne Girardot de Vermenoux (1736–1781), the widow of Georges-Tobie de Thellusson, a Genevan banker.

The house was situated at 30 rue de Provence in an English garden between Rue de Provence and Rue de la Victoire. It opened on Rue de Provence with a large gate in the shape of a triumphal arch in the "Medici style" at the end of Rue Laffitte, which at the time was called Rue d'Artois. The house was visible from the street at the end of its driveway. There was also a circular central courtyard with a rock in the centre and a colonnade around the outside.

After her death in 1781, Mme Thelusson's eldest son, John Isaac de Thellusson Sorcy (1764–1828), completed the house. As they were Swiss nationals, the Thellusson family kept ownership of the hotel during the Revolution, but they returned to it only in 1797.

After the Thermidorian Reaction, there was a "victims' ball" in the hotel for people who had had a close relative guillotined during the Revolution.

John Isaac sold the hotel in 1802 to the Prince Joachim Murat, who exchanged it in 1807 with Napoleon Bonaparte for the Hôtel de l'Élysée, which was renamed the Élysée Palace, as well as one million francs. Napoleon offered the house to Tsar Alexander Ist as the Russian Embassy in France. The tsar stayed there in 1818, and Carlo Andrea Pozzo di Borgo, adviser of the tsar, organized prestigious balls and receptions in the hotel.

The house was destroyed in 1826 when Rue Laffitte was extended to Rue de la Victoire.

== Bibliography ==
- Gabriel Girod de l’Ain: Les Thellusson, Histoire d’une famille du XIVème siècle à nos jours. Hérissey, Évreux 1977.
- Louis-Mayeul Chaudon, Antoine-François Delandine: Dictionnaire universel, historique, critique et bibliographique. Paris 1810.
- Émile Rivoire: Bibliographie historique de Genève au XVIIIème siècle. Genf 1897.
- Herbert Lüthy: La banque protestante en France. Paris 1959-1961.
