= Rue de Provence =

Street in Paris, France

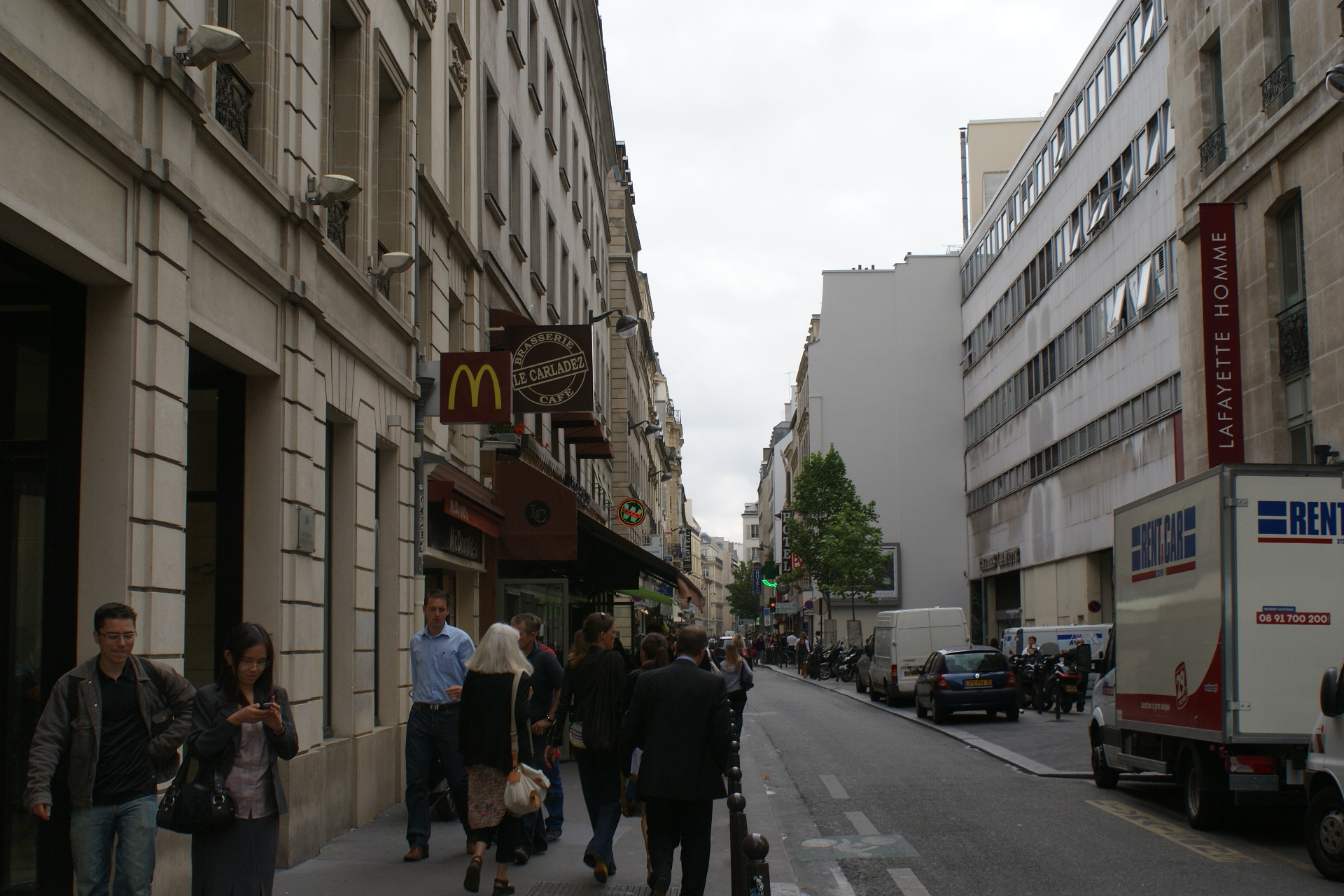

- Location within Paris
- Length: 1,193 m (3,914 ft)
- Width: 18 m (59 ft)
- Arrondissement: 8th, 9th
- Quarter: Chaussée d'Antin. Madeleine
- Coordinates: 48°52′27.02″N 2°20′10.57″E
- From: Rue du Faubourg-Montmartre
- To: Rue de Rome

Construction
- Completion: 1771

The Rue de Provence is a street in the 8th and 9th arrondissements of Paris. It begins at the Rue du Faubourg Montmartre and ends at the Rue de Rome. Only the short part of the street between the Rue du Havre and the Rue de Rome is in the 8th arrondissement.

== History ==
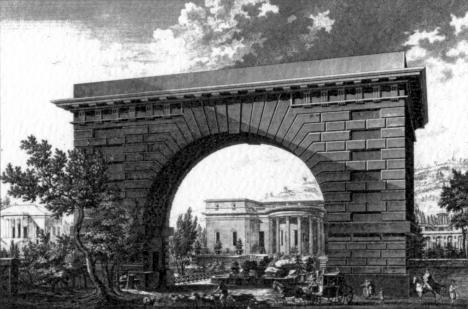
No. 34: former Hôtel Thellusson and its arch-shaped entrance (1778)

Where the road is now, there used to be a little river called the "Ruisseau de Menilmontant" (Menilmontant brook). With the Parisian population increasing, this little river became the two-metre wide "Grand Egout" (great sewer) in the 17th century.

Letters patent on December 15, 1770 allowed the banker Jean-Joseph de Laborde to create the Rue de Provence; which would cover the "Grand Egout". The width of the road was set at 30 feet, confirmed by two ministry decisions on March 20, 1813 and May 21, 1823.

While "Provence" is the name of a region in the south-east of France, the street is actually named in honor of Louis-Stanislas-Xavier, comte de Provence, king of France from 1814 to 1824 under the name of Louis XVIII.

In 1884, the Rue de Provence absorbed the Rue Saint-Nicolas-d'Antin, which extended it further west.

Located near the Metro stations: Le Peletier, Havre - Caumartin and Trinité - d'Estienne d'Orves.

== Notable places ==
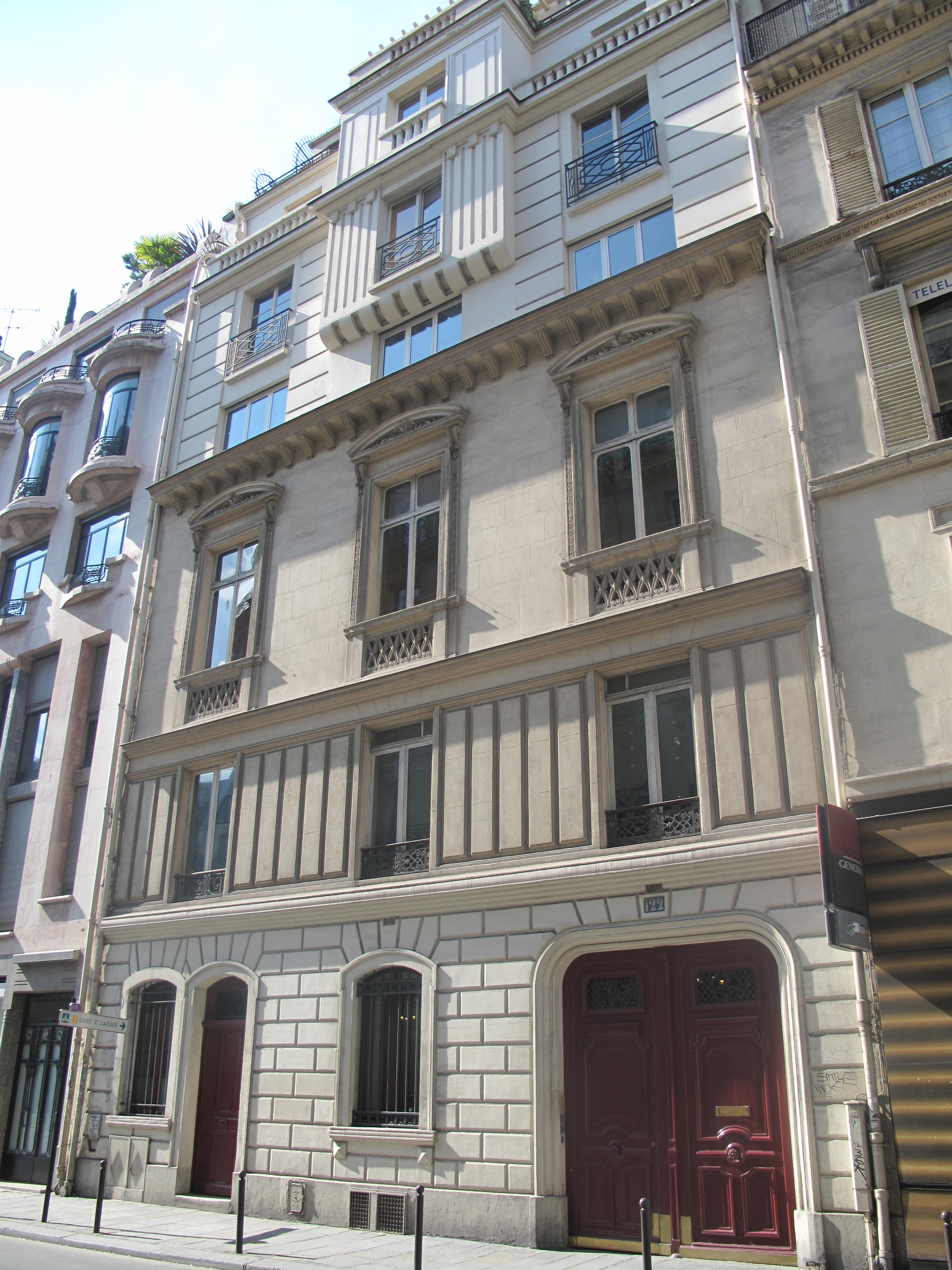
The building of the former "One-two-two"

- No. 22 (corner of the Rue Chauchat): 18th-century mansion transformed by Samuel Bing into an Art Nouveau exposition building in 1895. Sold in 1904 to the ébénist Louis Majorelle as an exposition room. Now a post office, keeping the exterior decoration.
- No. 32: Rare example of a building built in the late 1790s.
- No. 34: The door is the only remainder of the Hôtel Thellusson, built in 1778 by Claude-Nicolas Ledoux for the widow of Swiss banker Georges-Tobie de Thellusson. The opening of the hôtel on the Rue de Provence was a huge triumphal arch. The hôtel was destroyed in 1826 when the Rue Laffitte was lengthened.
- No. 122: location of one of the most famous former lupanars, the One-two-two.
- No. 126: Building built in 1911 by Henri Sauvage and Charles Sarrazin for the French decorator Louis Majorelle.
