= Rue Laffitte =

Street in Paris, France

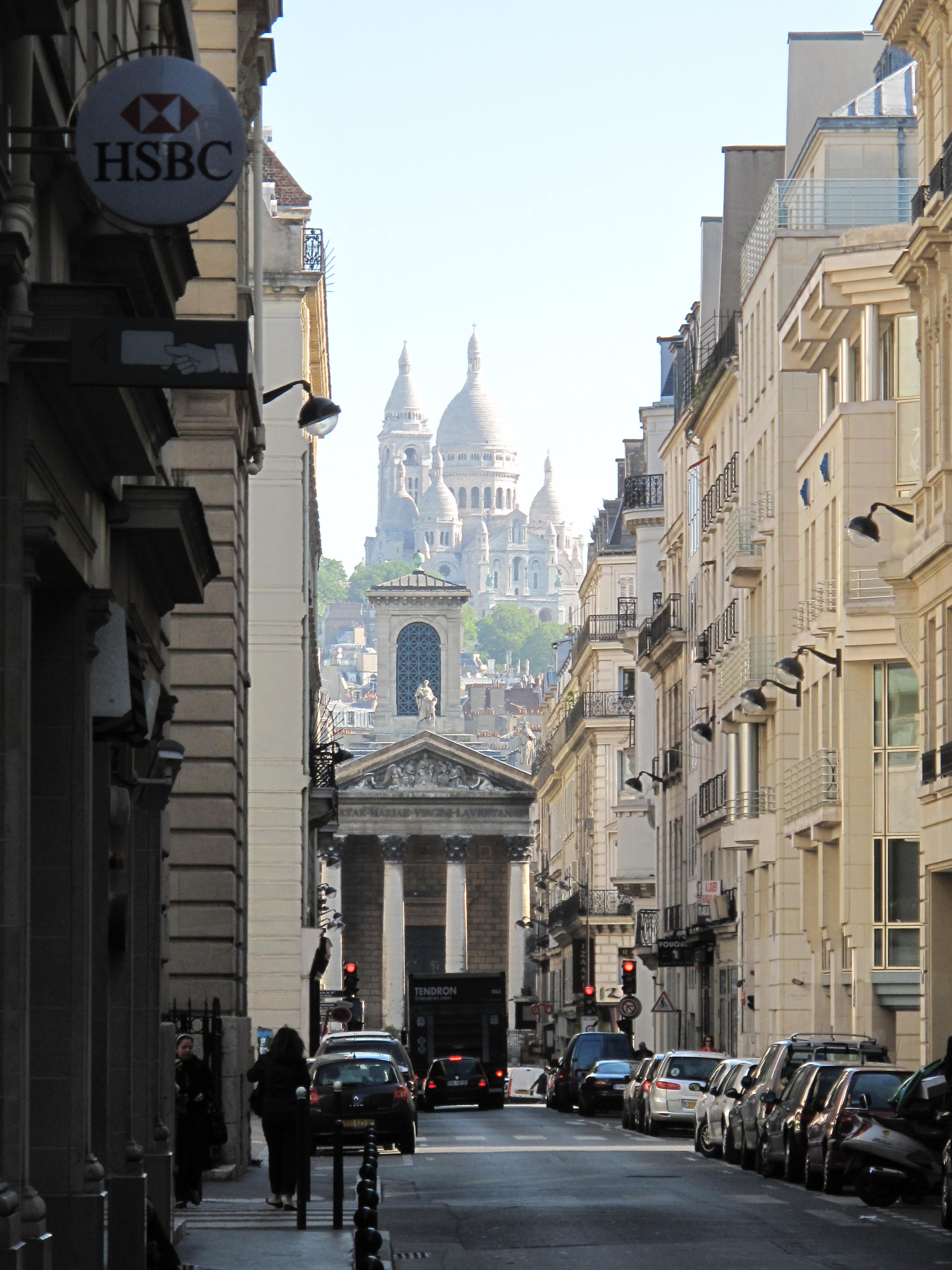
- View towards the church of Notre-Dame-de-Lorette, with the Sacré-Cœur in the background

- Location within Paris
- Arrondissement: 9th
- Quarter: Chaussée d'Antin
- Coordinates: 48°52′25.9″N 2°20′16.67″E
- From: Boulevard des Italiens
- To: Rue Notre-Dame-de-Lorette

The Rue Laffitte is a street in the 9th arrondissement of Paris, located near the Metro stations Richelieu - Drouot and Notre-Dame-de-Lorette.

== History ==
This street was created in 1771 between the Boulevard des Italiens and the Rue de Provence. Its original name was Rue d'Artois, in honour of the Comte d'Artois, brother of the King Louis XVI, later king of France with the name of Charles X. But in 1792, during the French Revolution, the prince had emigrated outside France and the street was renamed Rue Cerutti after Giuseppe Cerutti, an Italian former Jesuit and writer living in a mansion in the street at the junction with the Boulevard des Italiens, who became Republican and was elected to the French National Assembly. He wrote the eulogy of Mirabeau.

Louis Napoleon, the future Napoleon III, was born at number 15 on 20 April 1808. After the Bourbon Restoration, the street's name was changed back to Rue d'Artois. In 1826, the street was lengthened to the Rue Notre-Dame-de-Lorette, in the field of Hôtel Thellusson, which was destroyed.

The French financier and politician Jacques Laffitte (1767–1844) had his mansion at no. 27. On 30 July 1830, with Adolphe Thiers and La Fayette, he took part in the Revolution of 1830: they offered the crown to the future King Louis Philippe I, because King Charles X had allowed soldiers to shoot civilians and because they feared that a republic would lead to disorder and foreign wars. In December 1830, Laffitte was President of the French Council of Ministers and the street was renamed after him. Laffitte shares with Victor Hugo the honour of having lived in a street bearing his name.

Dowager queen Kishwar Sultana of erstwhile princely state of Oudh, in Northern India, stayed at the Hôtel Papy in 1858 on this street after she returned from London, when Queen Victoria refused her plea to restore her son Wajid Ali Shah to the throne of Oudh. Oudh had been annexed earlier by the British East India Company. In fact, she died at the hôtel and is buried at Père Lachaise Cemetery in Paris.

== Present-day ==
At the beginning of the street at the junction with the Boulevard des Italiens or the Boulevard Haussmann, there is an interesting view of the Sacré-Cœur de Montmartre, which seems to be on top of the church of Notre-Dame de Lorette. In fact, it is much more distant.
