= Hôtel d'Avaray =

Hôtel particulier in Paris, France

Coordinates: 48°51′20.61″N 2°19′18.2″E

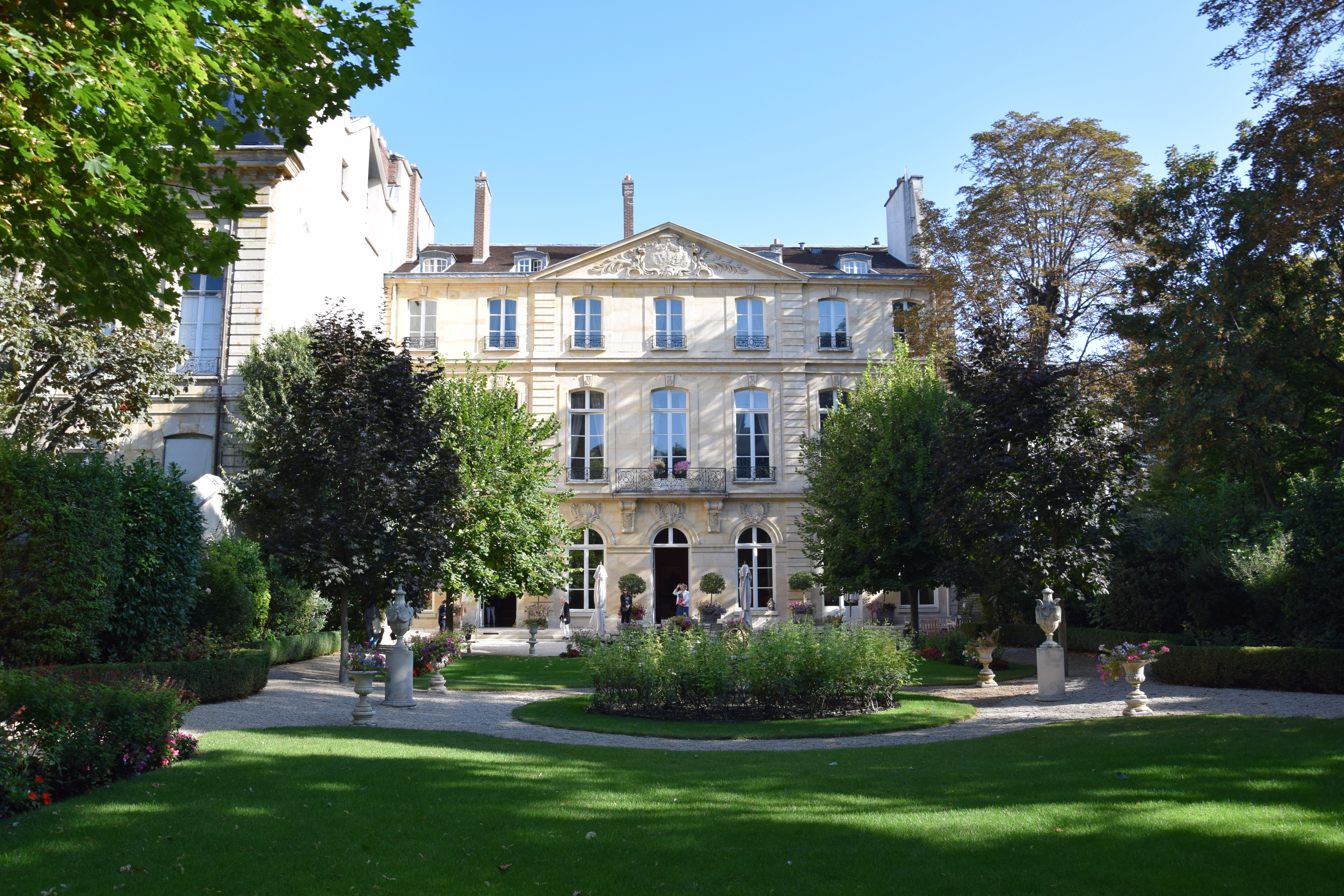
- Garden façade
- Interactive map of the Hôtel d'Avaray area

General information
- Type: Official residence Hôtel particulier (mansion)
- Architectural style: Classical
- Location: 85 Rue de Grenelle, Paris, France
- Current tenants: Jan Versteeg (2022), Ambassador of the Netherlands to France
- Construction started: 1718
- Completed: 1723; 303 years ago
- Client: Claude-Théophile de Béziade, marquis d'Avaray
- Owner: Kingdom of the Netherlands (since 1920)

Design and construction
- Architect: Jean-Baptiste Leroux

The Hôtel d'Avaray (French pronunciation: [otɛl davaʁɛ]) is an hôtel particulier on the Rue de Grenelle in the 7th arrondissement of Paris, France. Since 1920 it has been the official residence of the ambassador of the Netherlands to France.

== Gallery ==
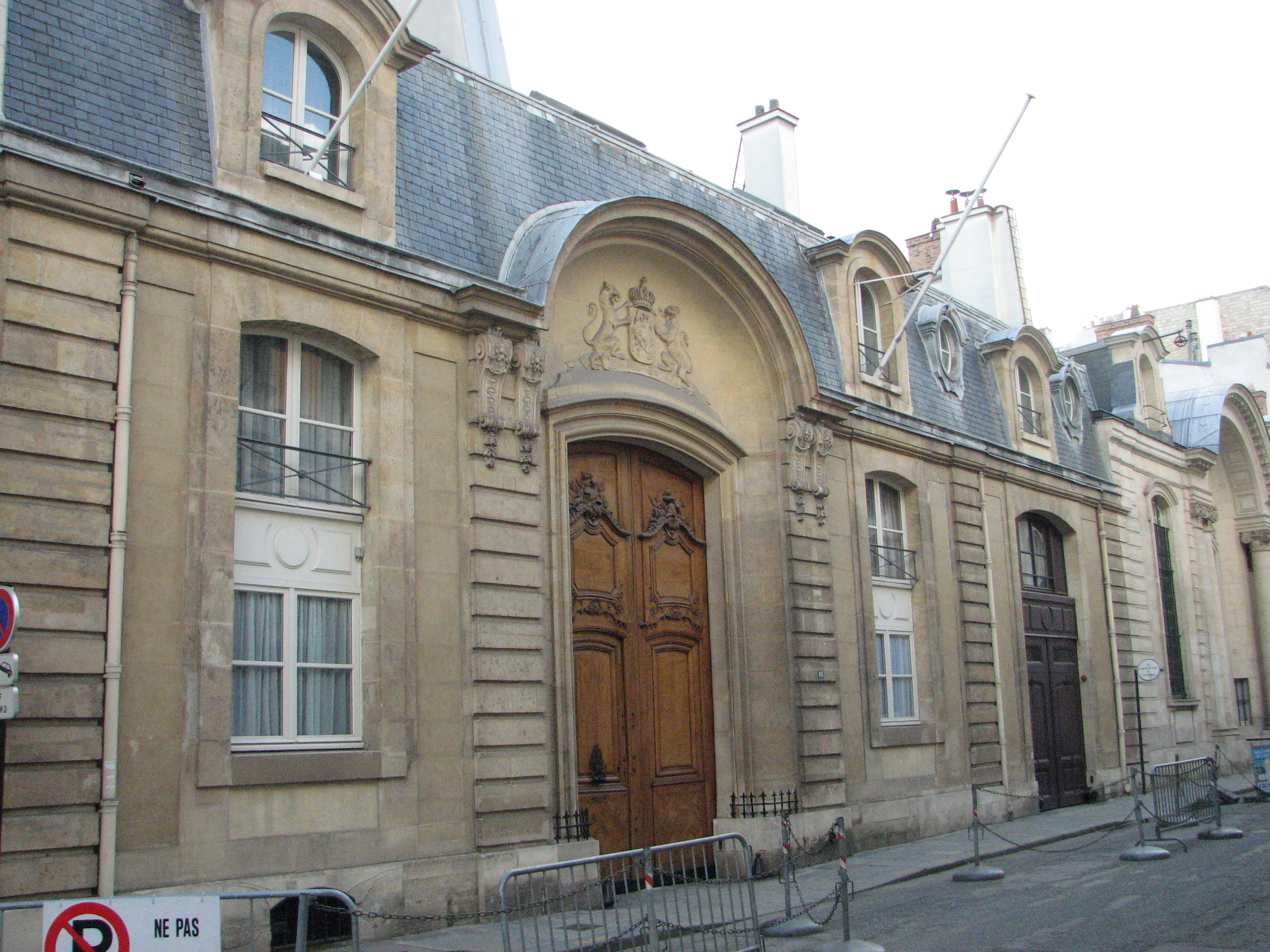
Entrance gate

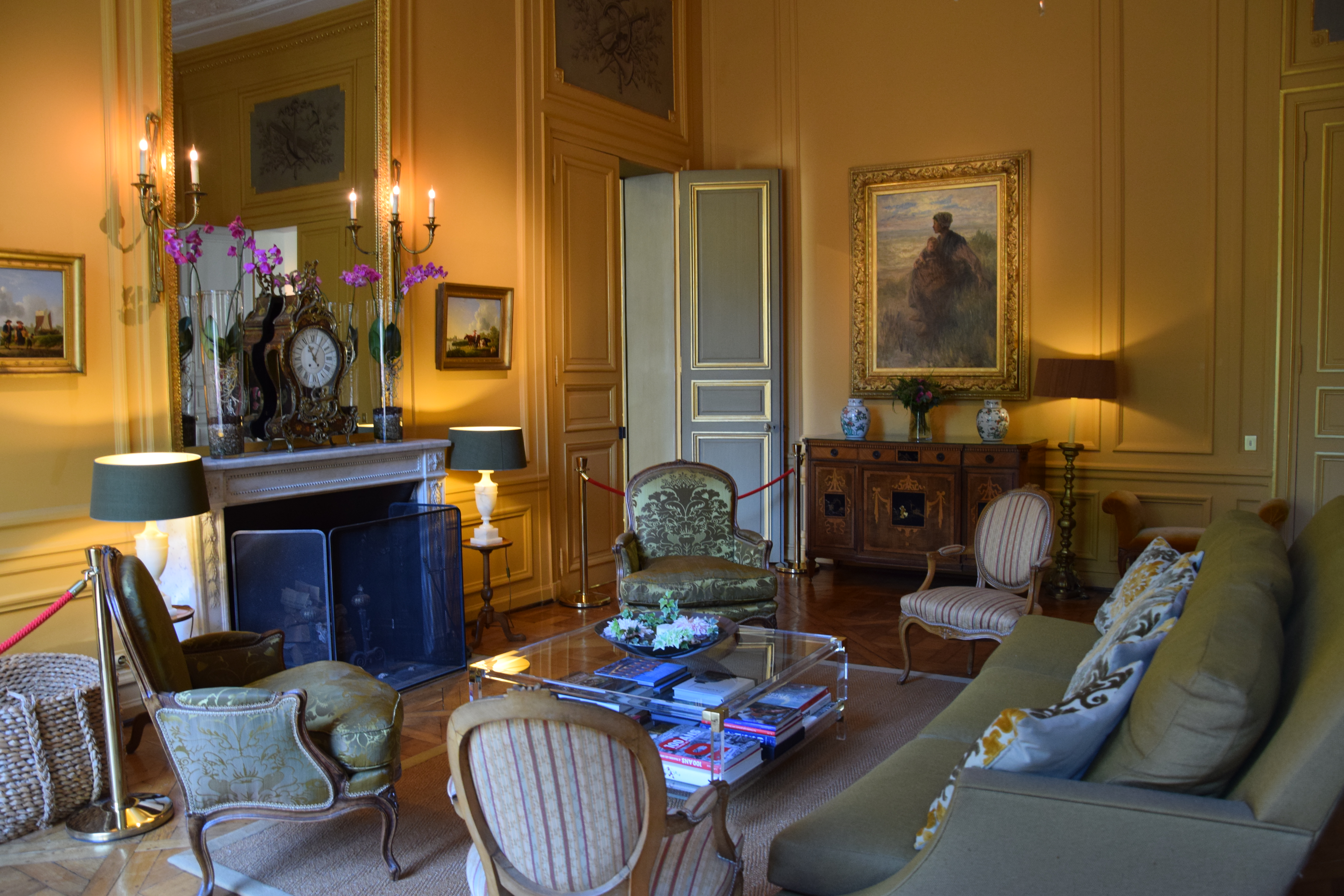
Salon

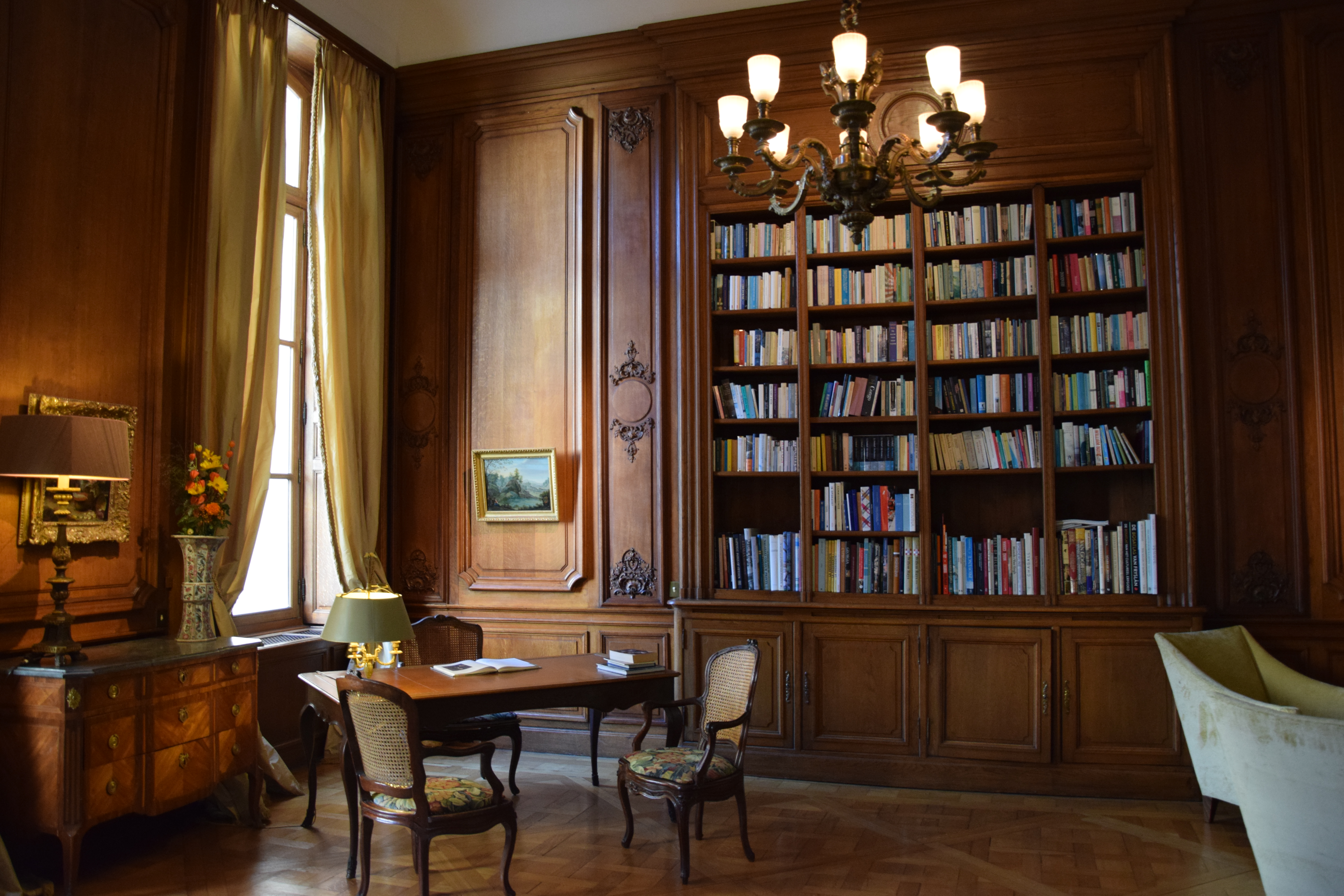
Library

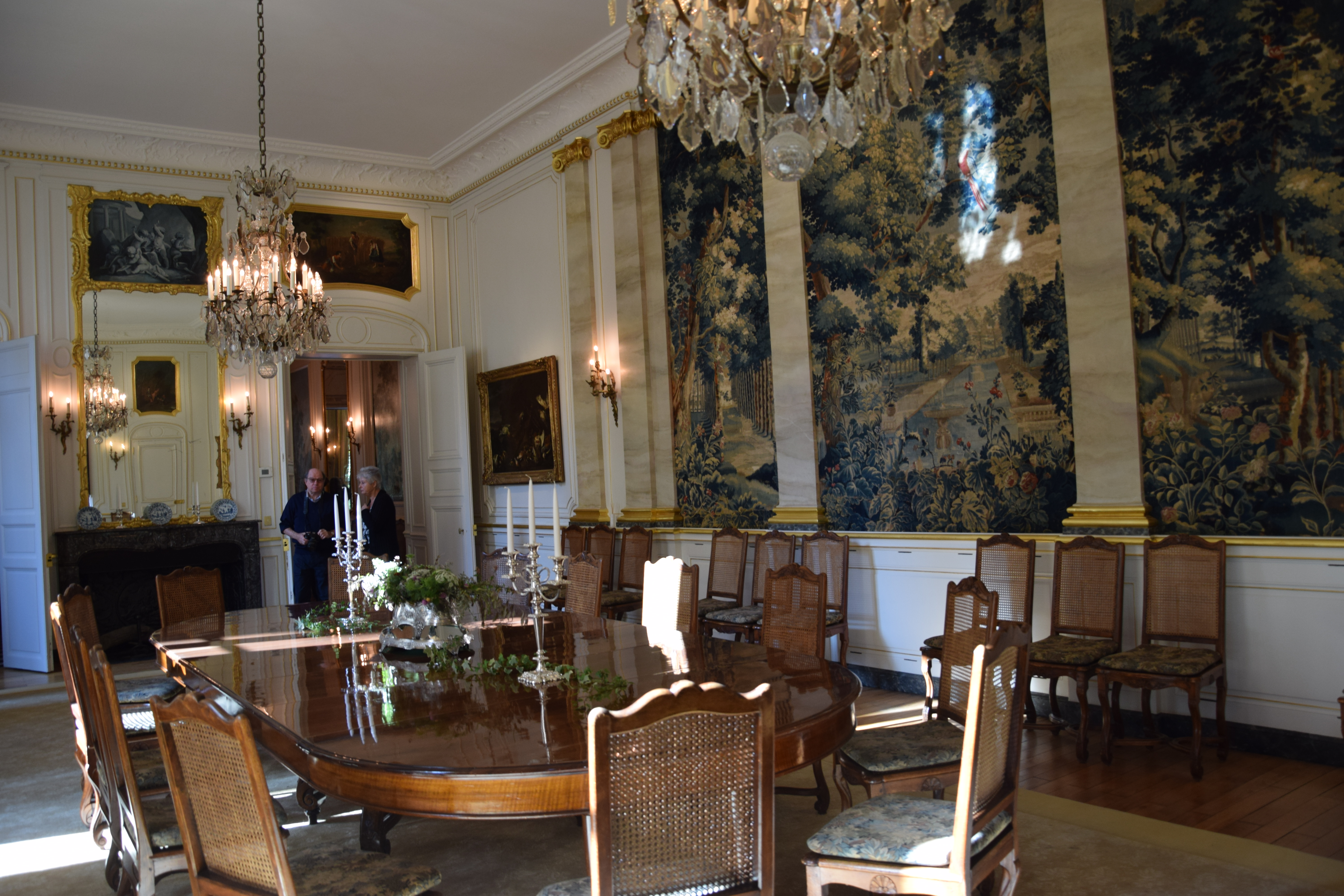
Dining room

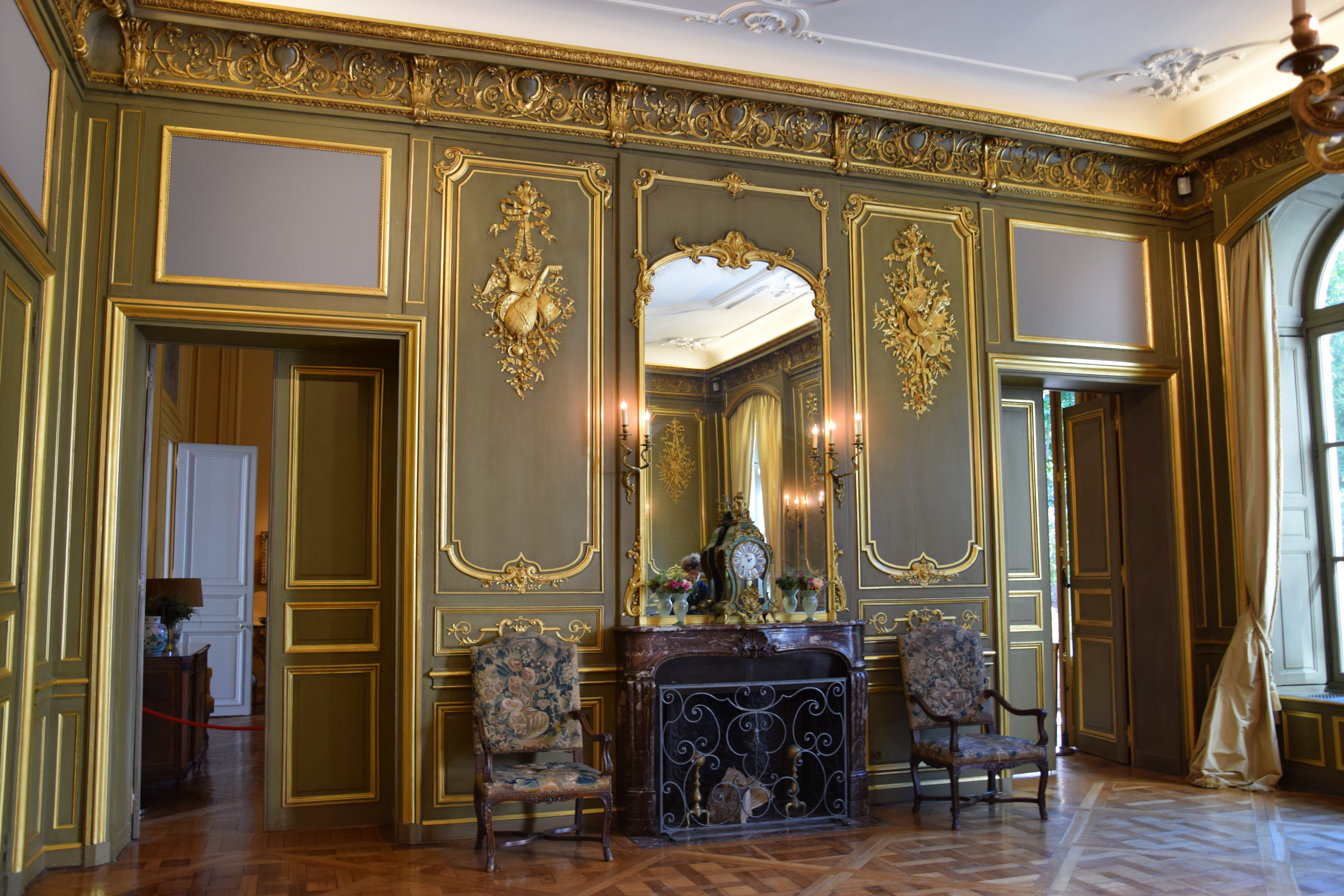
Music room

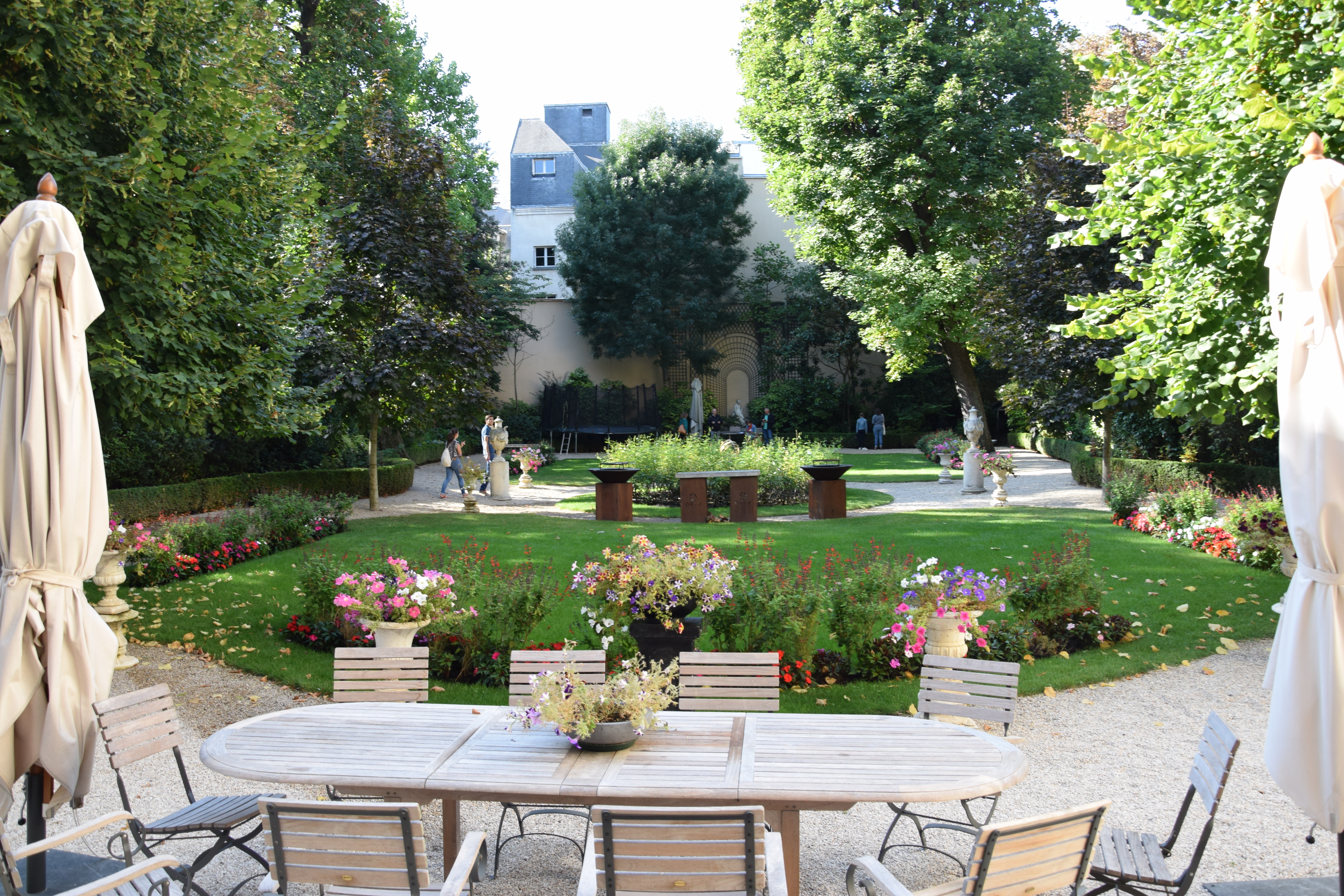
Garden
