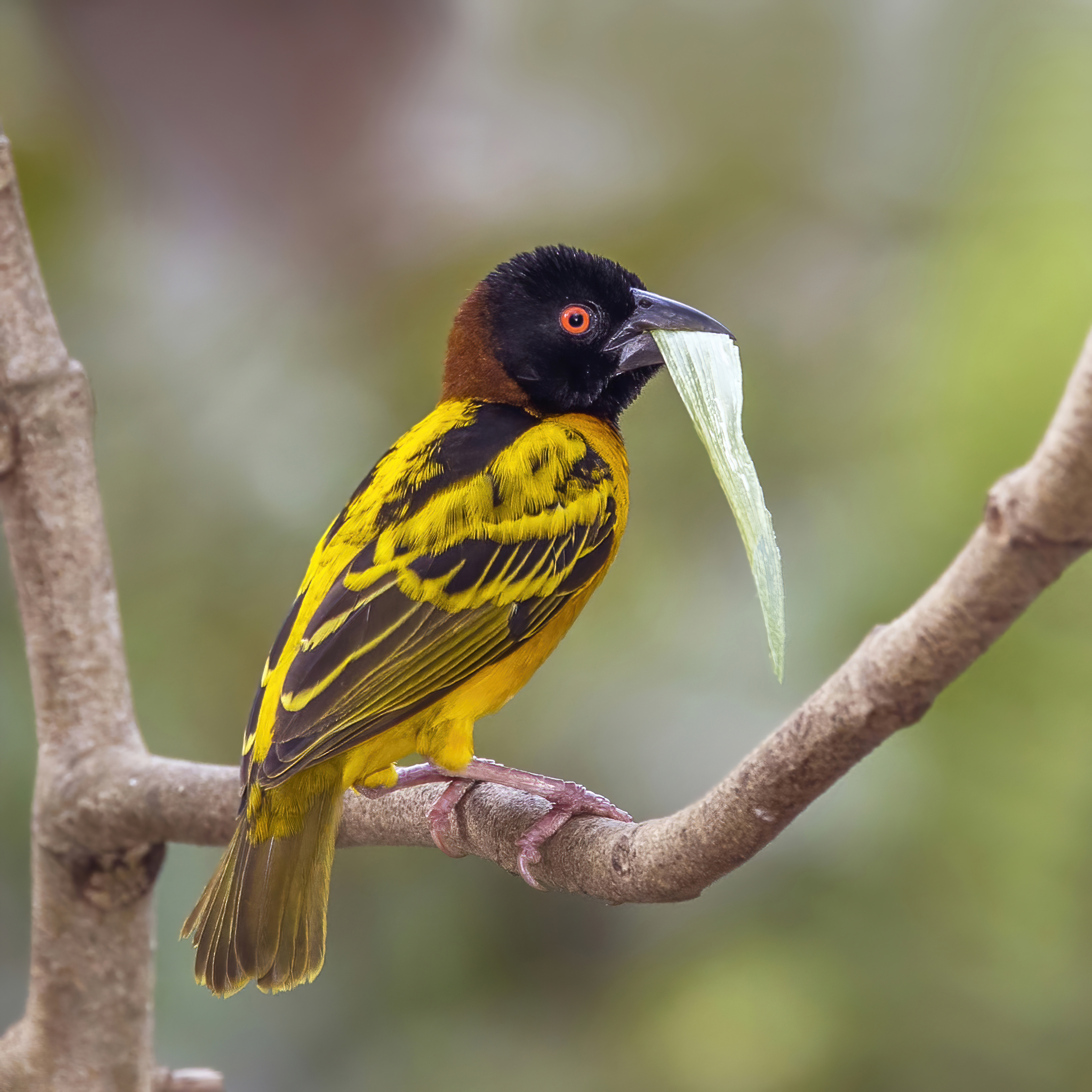
- Male, Kakum National Park, Ghana
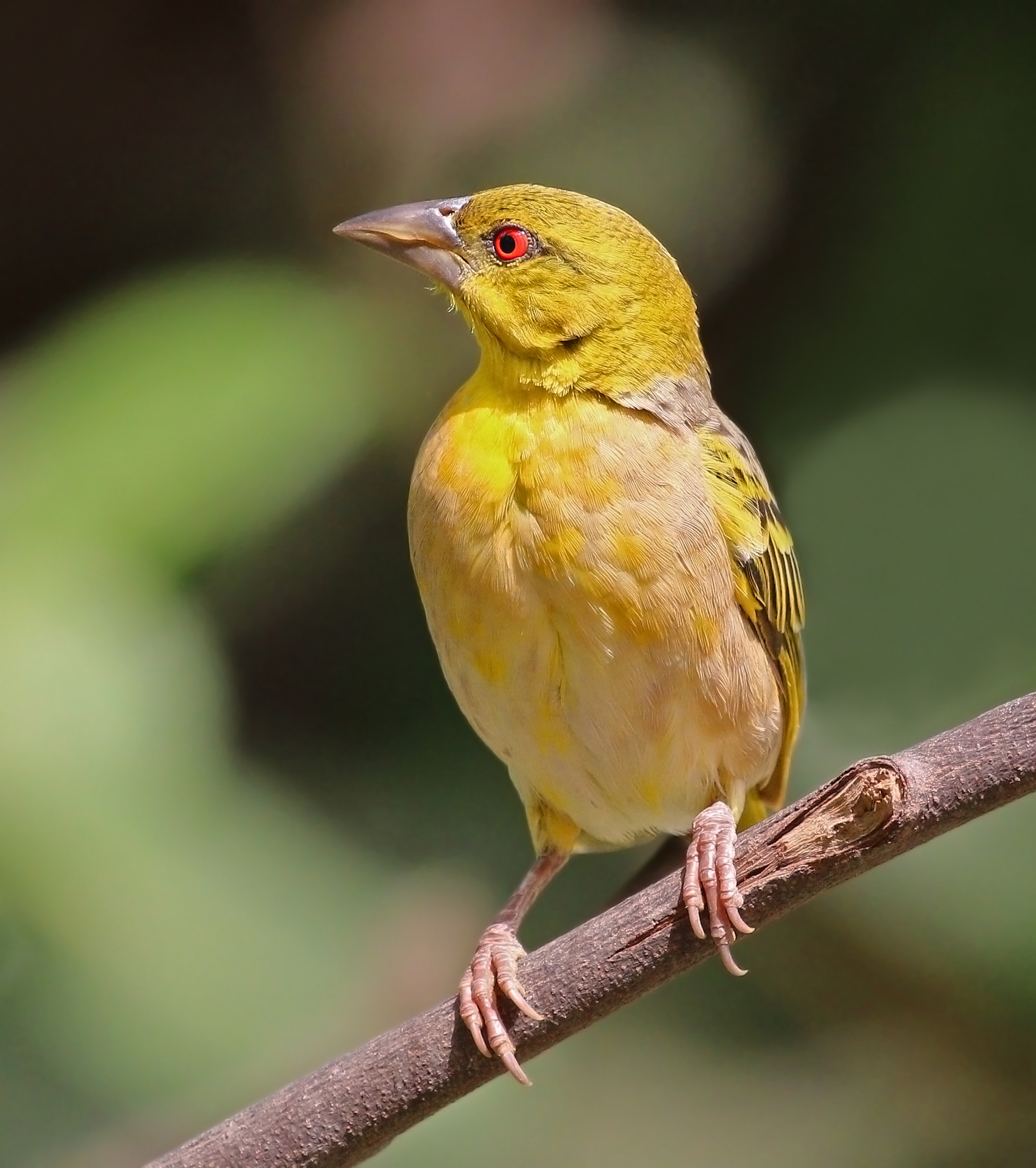
- Female, Gambia; Both P. c. cucullatus

Conservation status
- Least Concern (IUCN 3.1)

Scientific classification
- Kingdom: Animalia
- Phylum: Chordata
- Class: Aves
- Order: Passeriformes
- Family: Ploceidae
- Genus: Ploceus
- Species: P. cucullatus

Binomial name
- Ploceus cucullatus (Müller, 1776)

Subspecies
- See text
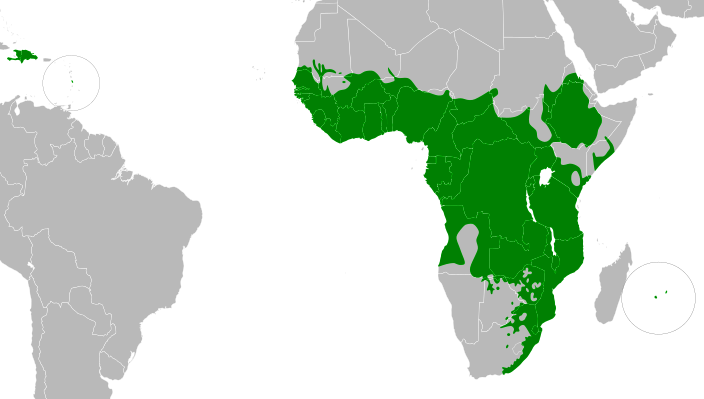
- native and introduced ranges

Synonyms
- Oriolus cucullatus Müller, 1776

= Village weaver =

Species of bird in the Ploceidae family

The village weaver (Ploceus cucullatus), also known as the spotted-backed weaver or black-headed weaver (the latter leading to easy confusion with P. melanocephalus), is a bird species in the family Ploceidae found in much of sub-Saharan Africa. It has also been introduced to Portugal and Venezuela as well as to the islands of Hispaniola, Martinique, Puerto Rico, Mauritius and Réunion.

This often abundant species occurs in a wide range of open or semi-open habitats, including woodlands and human habitation, and frequently forms large noisy colonies in towns, villages, and hotel grounds. This weaver builds a large coarsely woven nest made of grass and leaf strips with a downward-facing entrance, which is suspended from a branch in a tree. Two or three eggs are laid. Village weavers are colonial breeders, so many nests may hang from one tree.

Village weavers feed principally on seeds and grain, and can be a crop pest, but readily take insects, especially when feeding young, which partially redresses the damage to agriculture. The calls of this bird include harsh buzzes and chattering.

== Taxonomy and systematics ==
Philipp Ludwig Statius Müller provided the first scientific name, Oriolus cucullatus, in his 1776 translation in German of the famous Systema Naturae, written by Carl Linnaeus. The classification provided by Statius Muller was based on a description by Buffon, who in turn made use of work by Mathurin Jacques Brisson. Brisson was the first to publish a black-and-white etching of the bird in 1760. The first colored figure was made by François-Nicolas Martinet in a book titled Planches enluminées d'histoire naturelle by Edme-Louis Daubenton, that was published in 1783. The specimen described by Brisson was collected in Senegal between 1748 and 1754 by Michel Adanson, who sent it to René Antoine Ferchault de Réaumur in France. Latham eventually gave the scientific name Oriolus textor in 1790. Based on Oriolus textor, Johann Friedrich Gmelin erected in 1825 a new genus he named Textor. This name has priority over the use of the genus name in the combination Textor alecto that Temminck described in 1828, and which is a synonym for the first name of the white-billed buffalo-weaver, Coccothraustes albirostris, as named by Vieillot in 1817, and now assigned to the genus Bubalornis. The species epithet cucullatus is Latin and means "hooded".

In 1789, Johann Friedrich Gmelin distinguished Loxia abyssinica, which was later recognised as a subspecies of the village weaver and for which the new combination P. c. abyssinicus was created. Louis Pierre Vieillot described a slightly different bird that he called subspecies collaris in 1819. Nicholas Aylward Vigors in 1831 distinguished subspecies spilonotus.

=== Etymology ===
The first English name, "weever oriole" was given by John Latham, an early British ornithologist, whose work was often cited by Linnaeus. "Village weaver" has been designated the official name by the International Ornithological Committee. Other English names are "black-headed weaver", "Layard's black-headed weaver", "black-hooded weaver", "mottled-backed weaver", "mottled weaver", "spotted-backed weaver", "spot-backed weaver", and "V-marked weaver".

=== Subspecies ===
Eight subspecies are recognized:

- P. c. cucullatus – (Müller, 1776): The nominate subspecies occurs from Mauritania, Senegal and Gambia to southern Chad and Cameroon. It also can be found on Bioko. Also introduced to Hispaniola.
- P. c. abyssinicus – (Gmelin, JF, 1789): Found in northern Sudan, Eritrea and Ethiopia
- P. c. bohndorffi – Reichenow, 1887: Found in southern Sudan, northern Democratic Republic of Congo, Uganda, western Kenya and north-western Tanzania
- P. c. collaris (mottled weaver) – Vieillot, 1819: Found in Gabon, western Democratic Republic of Congo and Angola
- P. c. graueri – Hartert, 1911: Found in eastern Democratic Republic of Congo, Rwanda and western Tanzania
- P. c. frobenii – Reichenow, 1923: Found in southern and south-eastern Democratic Republic of Congo
- P. c. nigriceps (Layard's weaver) – (Layard, EL, 1867): Found from southern Somalia and eastern Kenya through eastern and southern Tanzania to south-eastern Democratic Republic of Congo, southern Angola and north-eastern Namibia, western Zimbabwe, eastern Zambia and central Mozambique. It also occurs on São Tomé where it was probably introduced.
- P. c. spilonotus (spotted-backed weaver) – Vigors, 1831:, Found in south-eastern Botswana, eastern South Africa and southern Mozambique. Also introduced to Mauritius, Réunion, and Venezuela.

== Description ==
The village weaver is a stocky, 15–17 cm (5.9–6.7 in) bird with a strong conical bill and dark reddish eyes. In the northern part of its range, the breeding male has a black head edged by chestnut (typically most distinct on the nape and chest). Towards the southern part of its range, the amount of black and chestnut diminish, and the breeding males of the southernmost subspecies only have a black face and throat, while the nape and crown are yellow. In all subspecies, the breeding male has a black bill, black and yellow upperparts and wings, and yellow underparts.

The nonbreeding male has a yellow head with an olive crown, grey upperparts and whitish underparts. The wings remain yellow and black. The adult female has streaked olive upperparts, yellow and black wings, and pale yellow underparts. Young birds are like the female, but browner on the back.

== Distribution and habitat ==
The village weaver is among the more common weaver species, and is widespread in sub-Saharan Africa, but is absent from the arid regions in the southwest and northeast. It has been introduced to islands in the Indian Ocean and the Caribbean, where it has adapted well to the climates similar to its original range.

== Behavior and ecology ==
Village weavers forage and roost in large groups, often with other weaver species. In some areas, they move periodically along fixed routes. The birds look for food on the ground, but also look up to search vegetation and trees. Village weavers nest in colonies and are very active during the breeding season. Birds fly in and leave again constantly, making significant noise. Colonies can contain as many as 150 nests, but eight to a hundred nests in a single tree are usual.

A village weaver's nest is 14–17 cm (5.5–6.7 in) long and 11–13 cm (4.3–5.1 in) high. The entrance is mostly extended into a tube of 4–8 cm (1.6–3.1 in) long. The male weaves the structure of the nest using long strips of leaf that he has torn from palms or large grass species such as Arundo donax. The nest is roofed, ovoid or kidney-shaped, internally consisting of a nesting chamber that is separated by a ground sill from an antechamber, that has the entrance of the entire nest at the bottom. On the inside, the ceiling is made of strips of grass or other leaves, which are simply inserted instead of woven in. The floor on the inside is lined by short, thatched strips of palm, grass blades or heads, and feathers. The nest requires about 300 long strips of leaf, which the male tears off and transports one by one. The male gathers building material throughout the building process, during which he works with his feet in exactly the same position, and maintaining the same orientation. He starts by creating the attachment by weaving around mostly two hanging branches just below a fork, a foot on both of them, which he includes in a ring he constructs by weaving in the plain of the branches at the edge of his reach. He then extends the high end of the ring in front of its head, gradually working towards his feet creating a half-globe that is the nesting chamber. The male continues by constructing the roof of the antechamber, working over his head. This is followed by lining the ceiling, and constructing the entrance tube, hanging upside-down, but still with his feet at the same spots. The weaving technique consists of seizing a strip of near the end and double the strip back on itself. Next he pokes the end with a vibrating movement in between his previous work until it sticks. He then releases it, moves his head to the other side of the nest wall, seizes the strip again, and pokes it in somewhere. He keeps repeating this, regularly reversing the direction in which he weaves the strip, poking and pulling the strip through holes until the entire length is used. The female collects material, too, but she occupies herself only with the lining of the nesting cup.

== Gallery ==
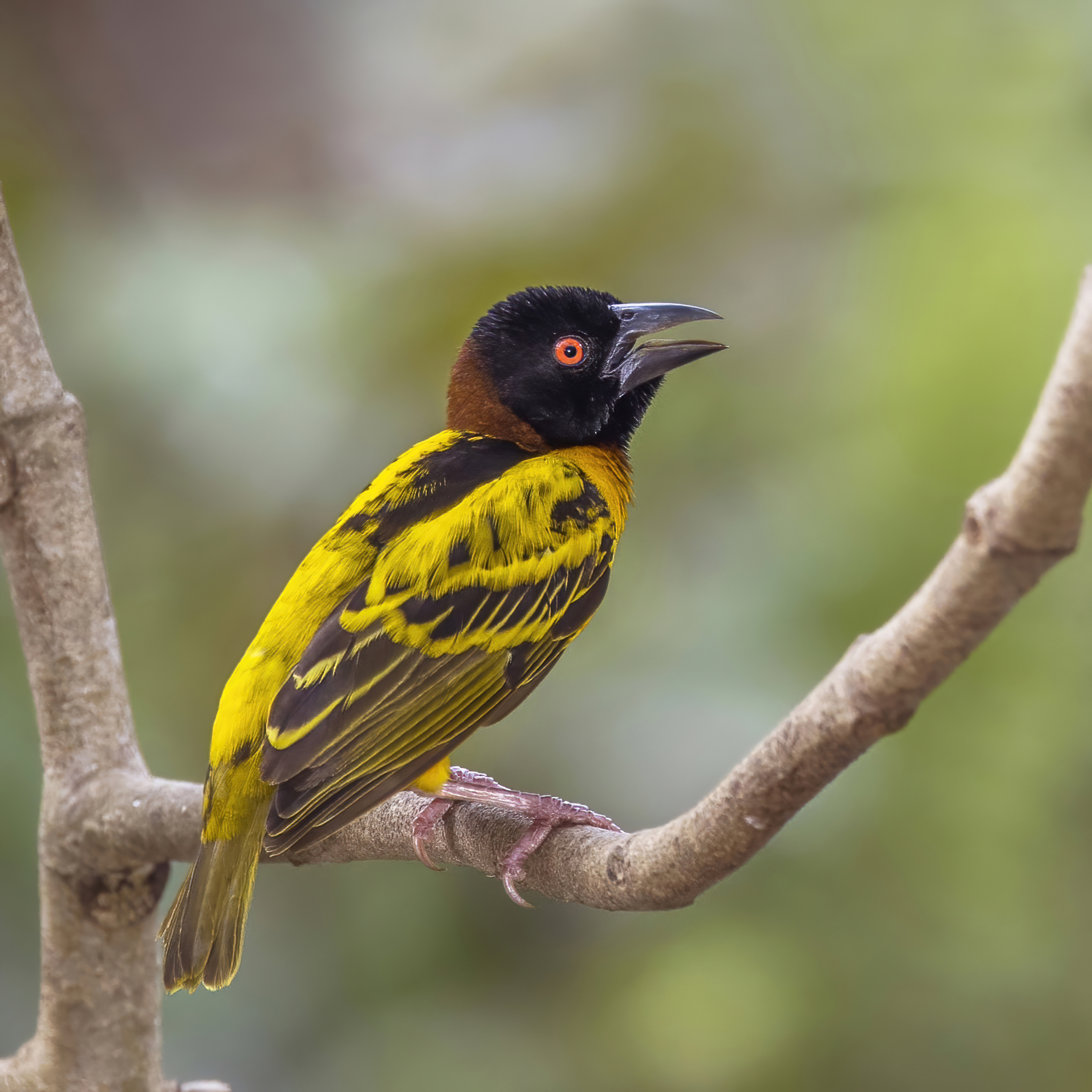
Male (breeding)
P. c. cucullatus, Ghana

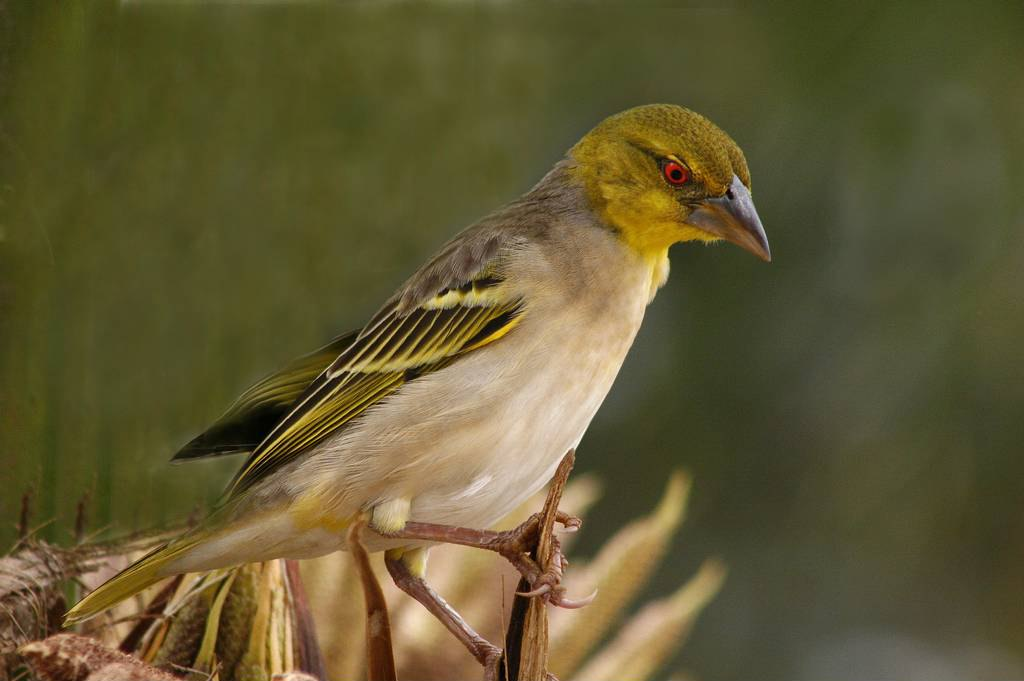
Male (non-breeding)
P. c. cucullatus, Gambia

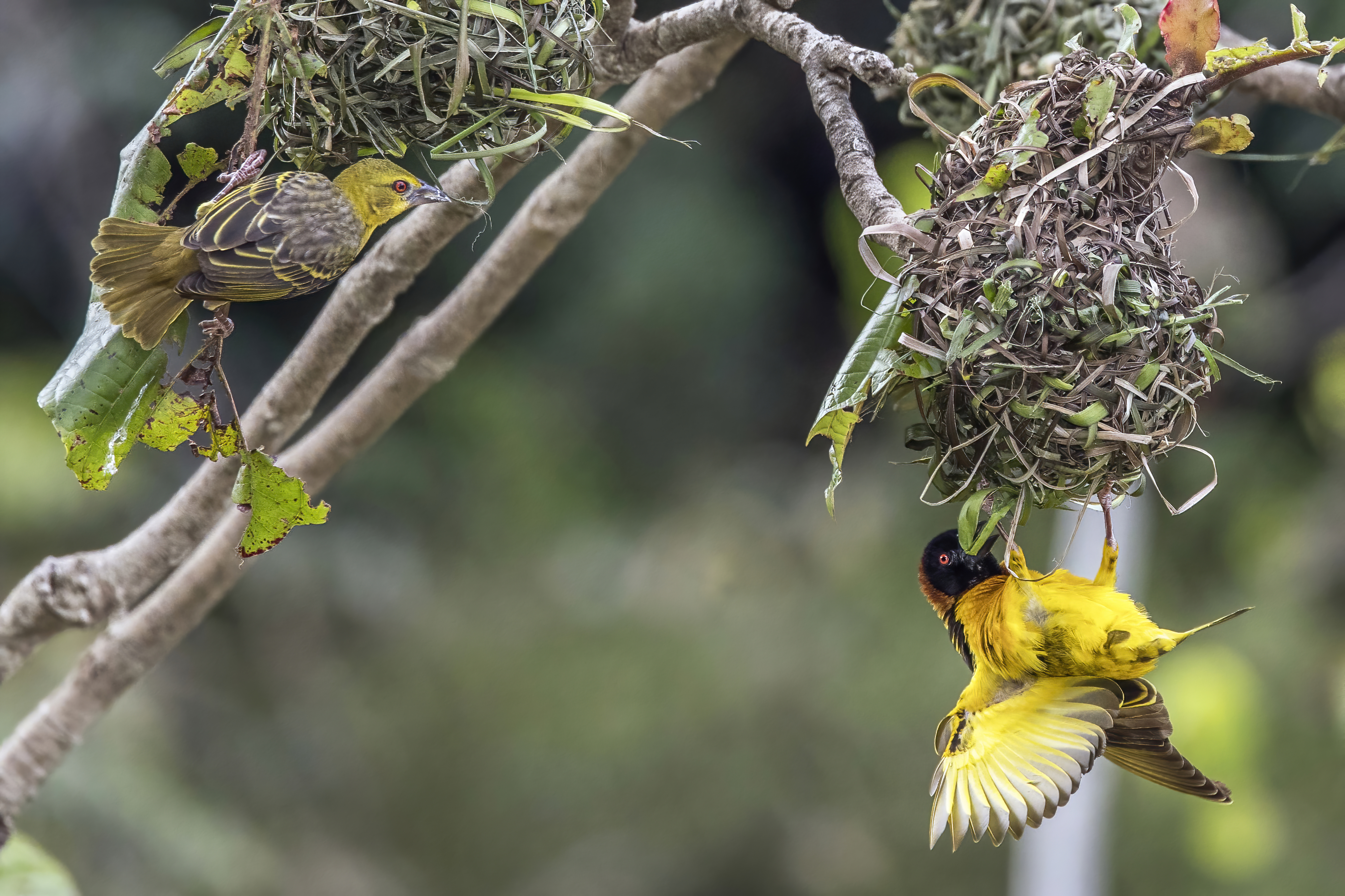
Female and male at nests, Ghana

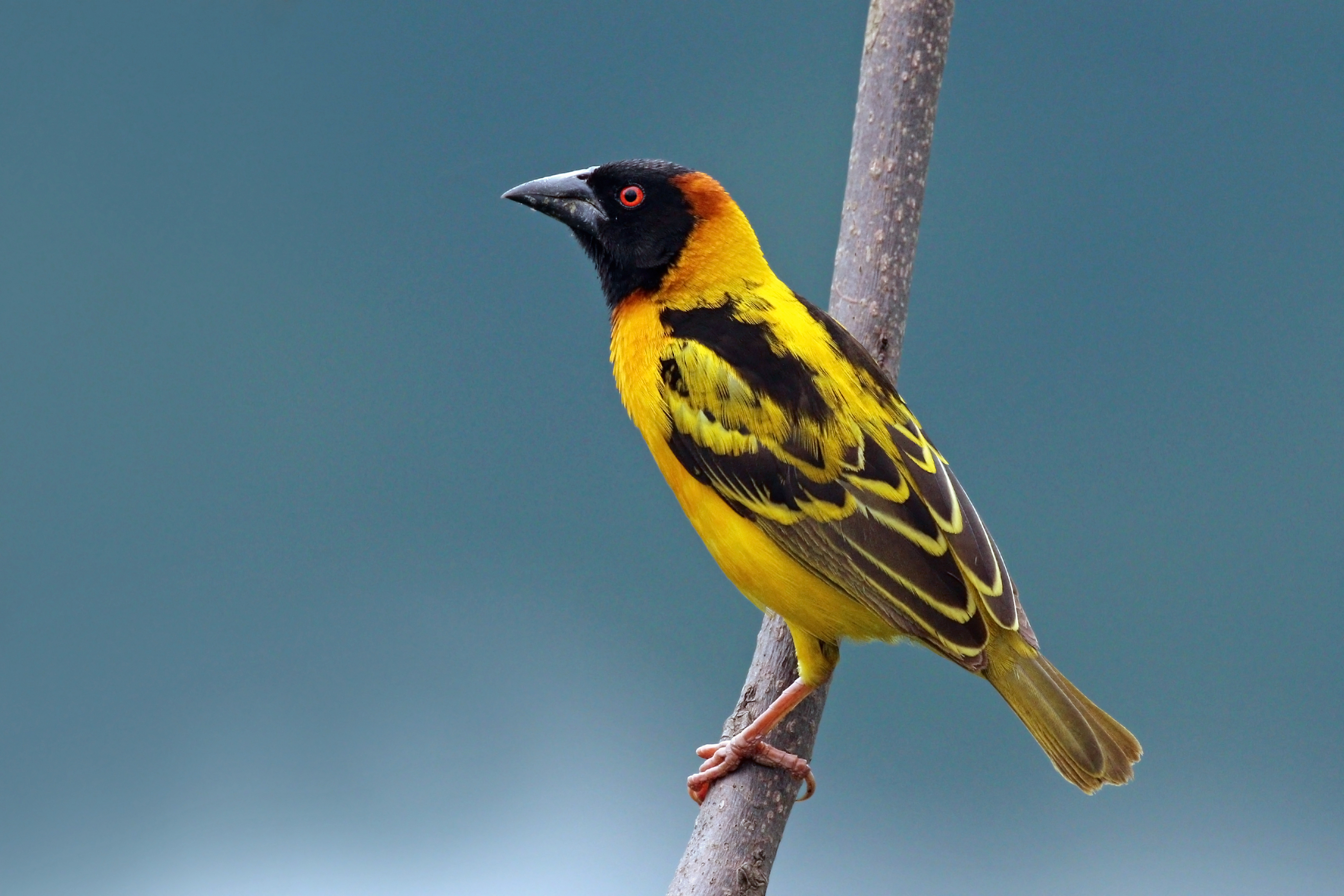
Male
P. c. bohndorffi, Uganda

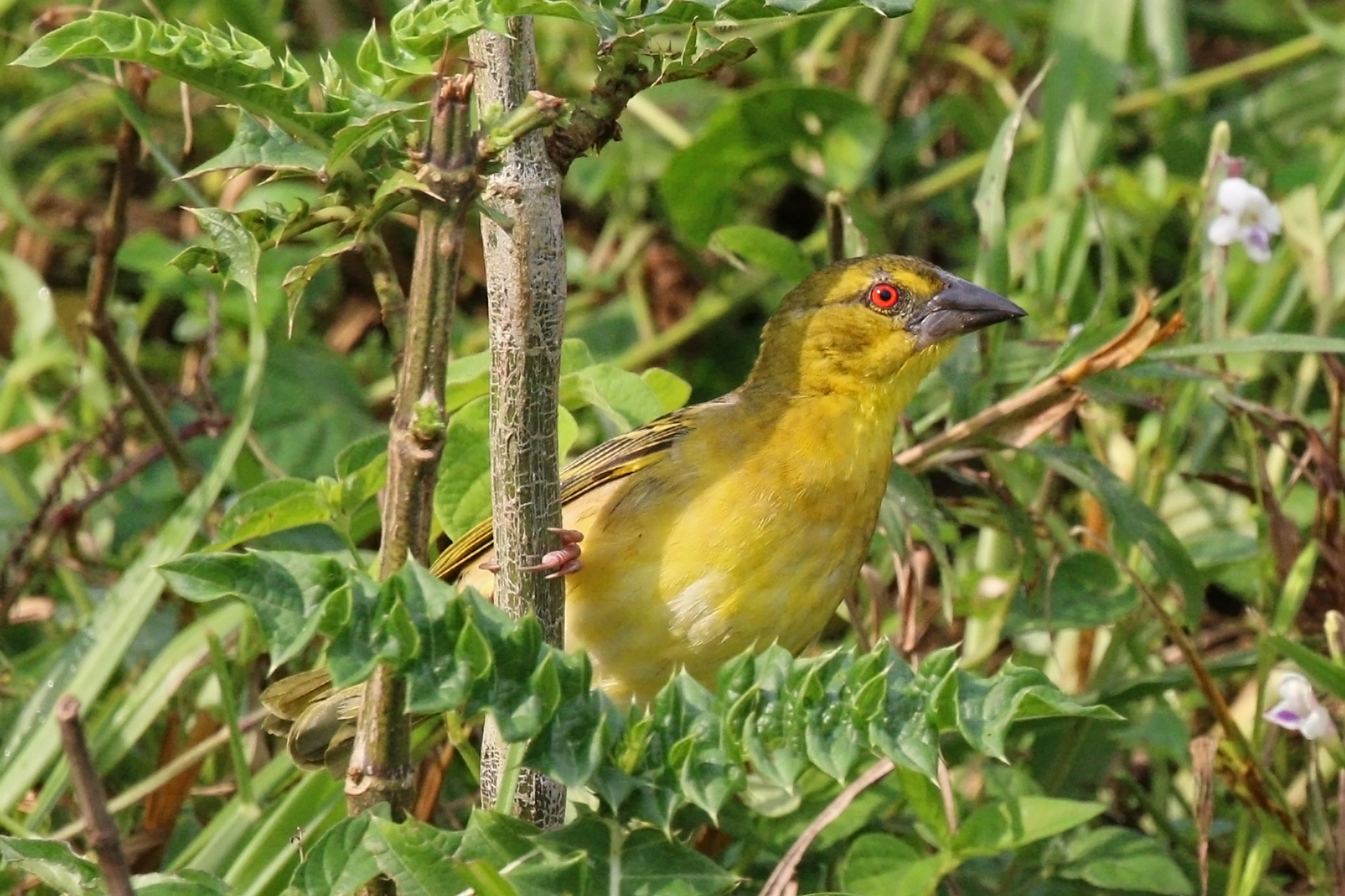
Female
P. c. bohndorffi, Uganda

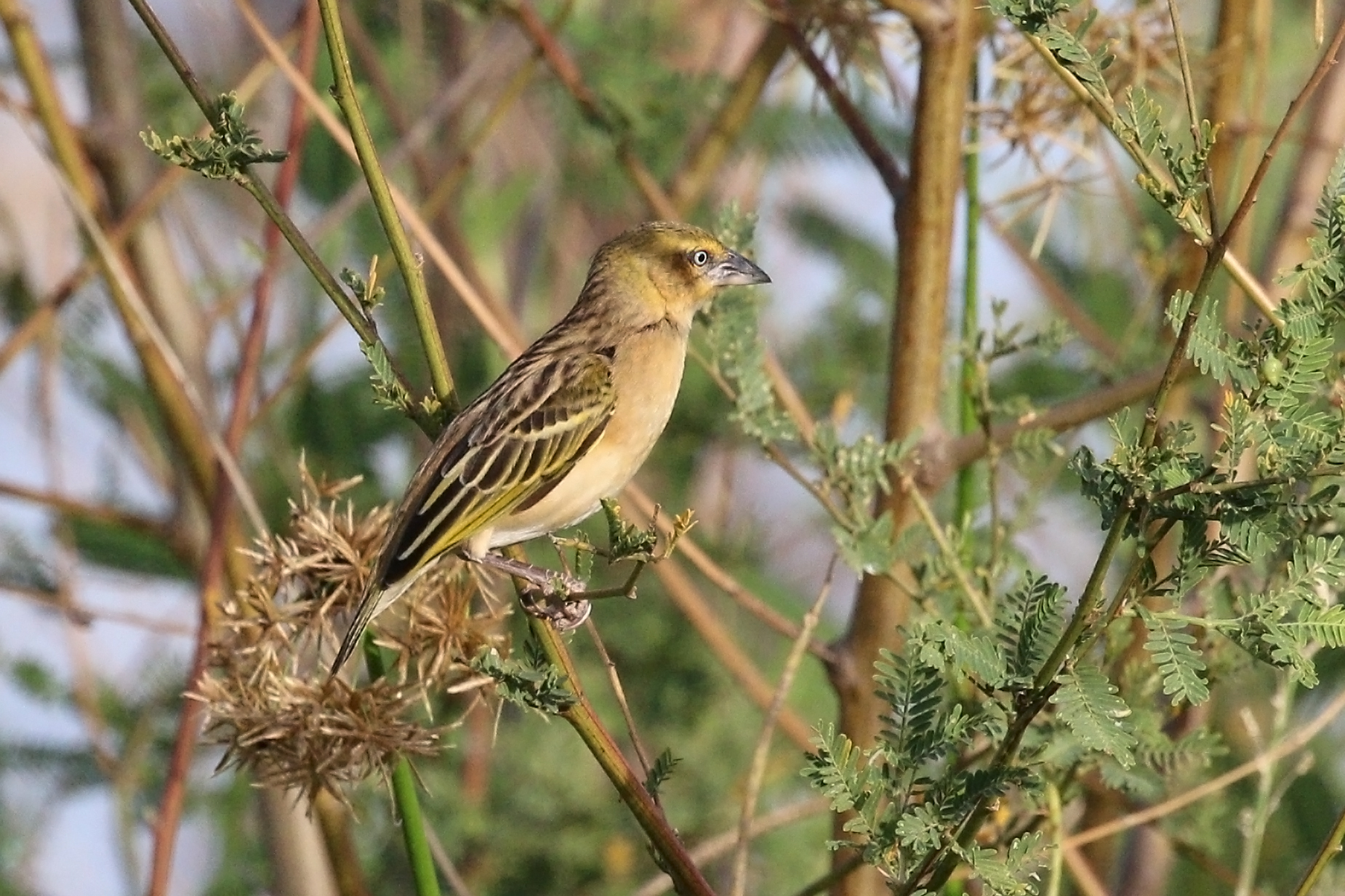
Juvenile (with white eye)
P. c. bohndorffi, Kenya

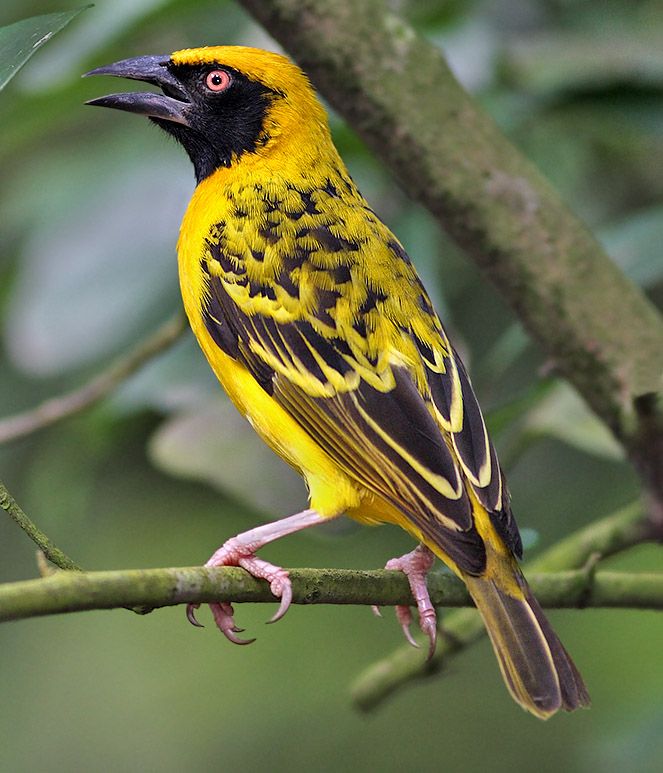
Male
P. c. spilonotus

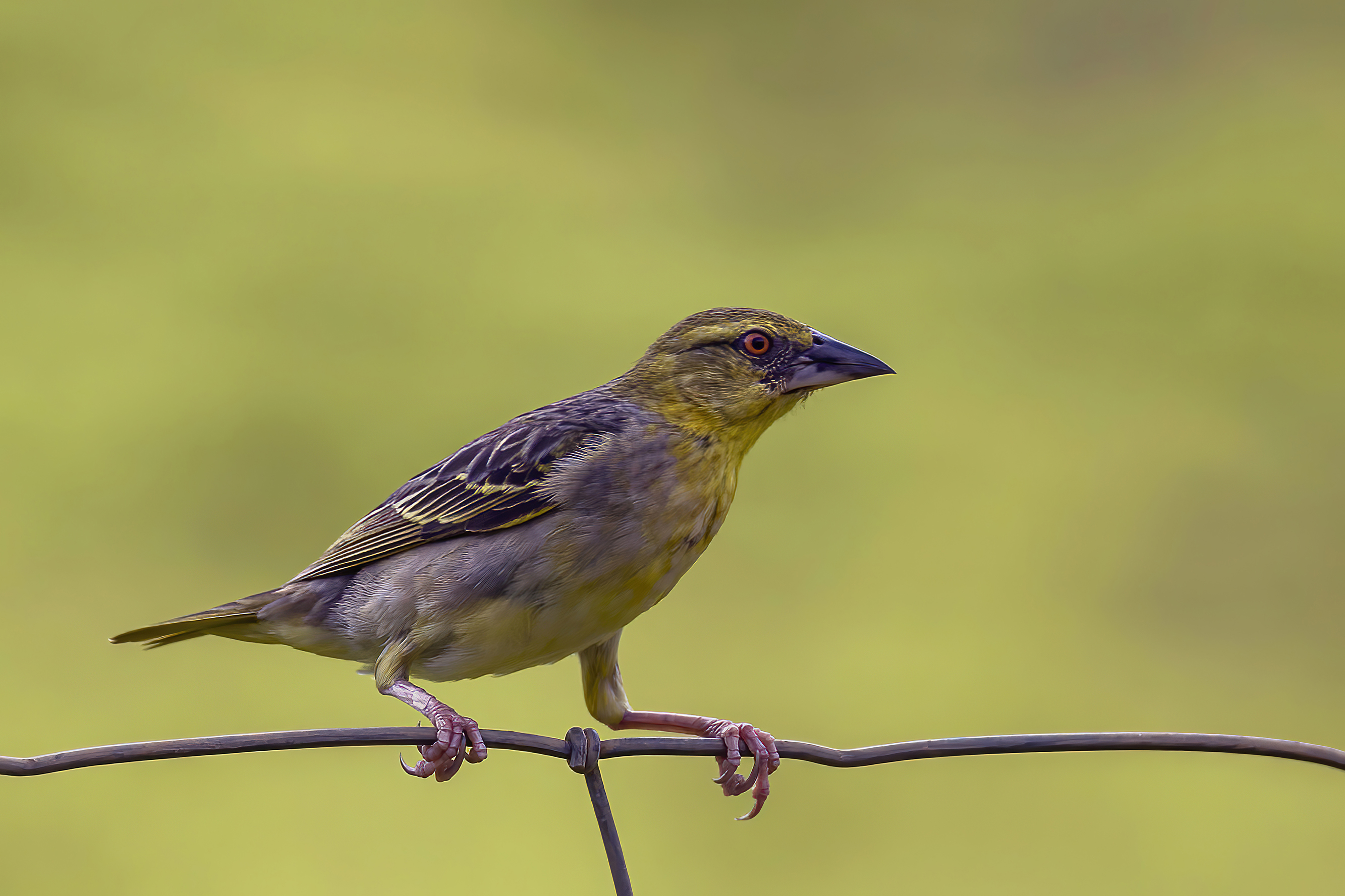
Female
P. c. spilonotus, Mauritius

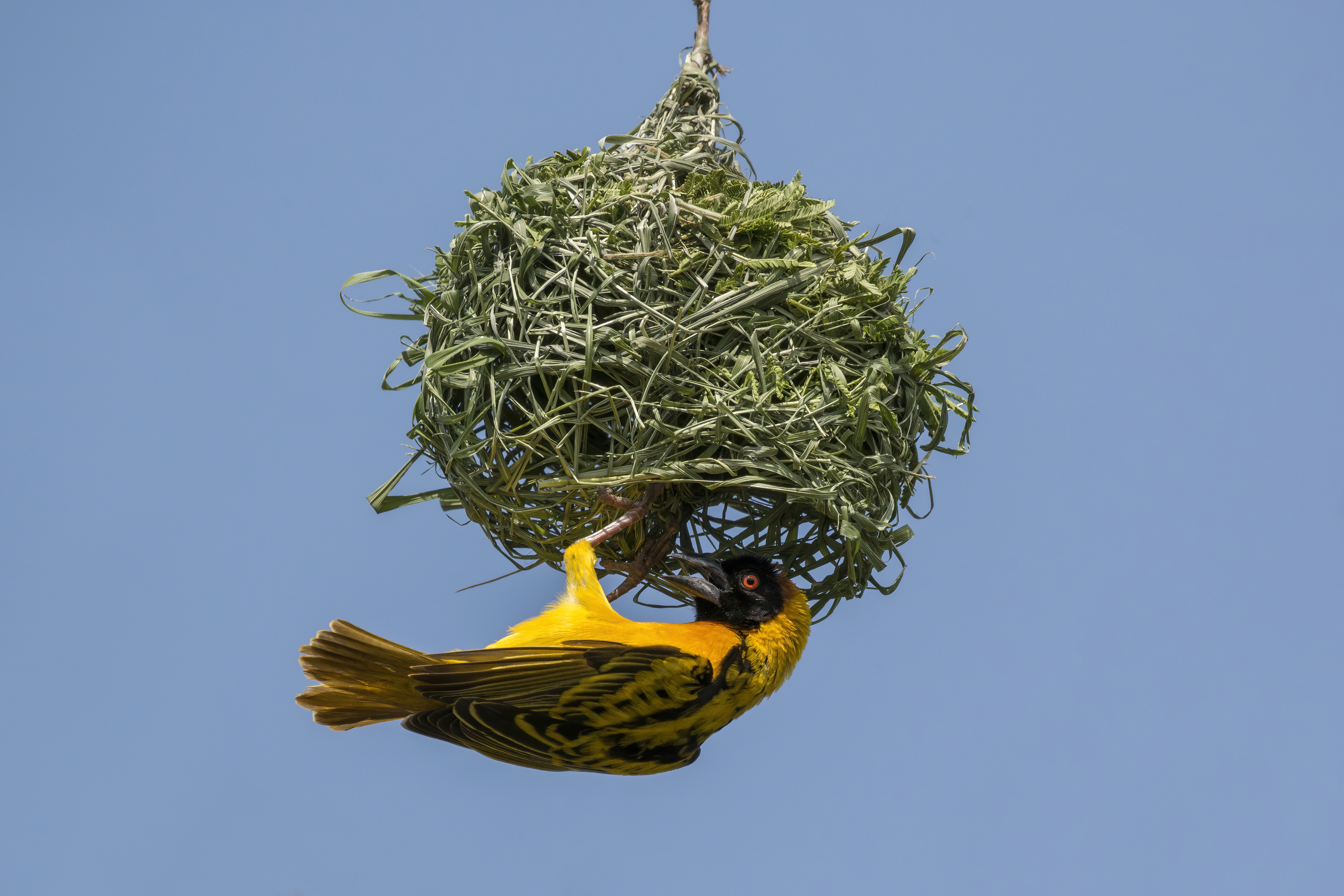
Male nest building, Uganda

Nests, South Africa

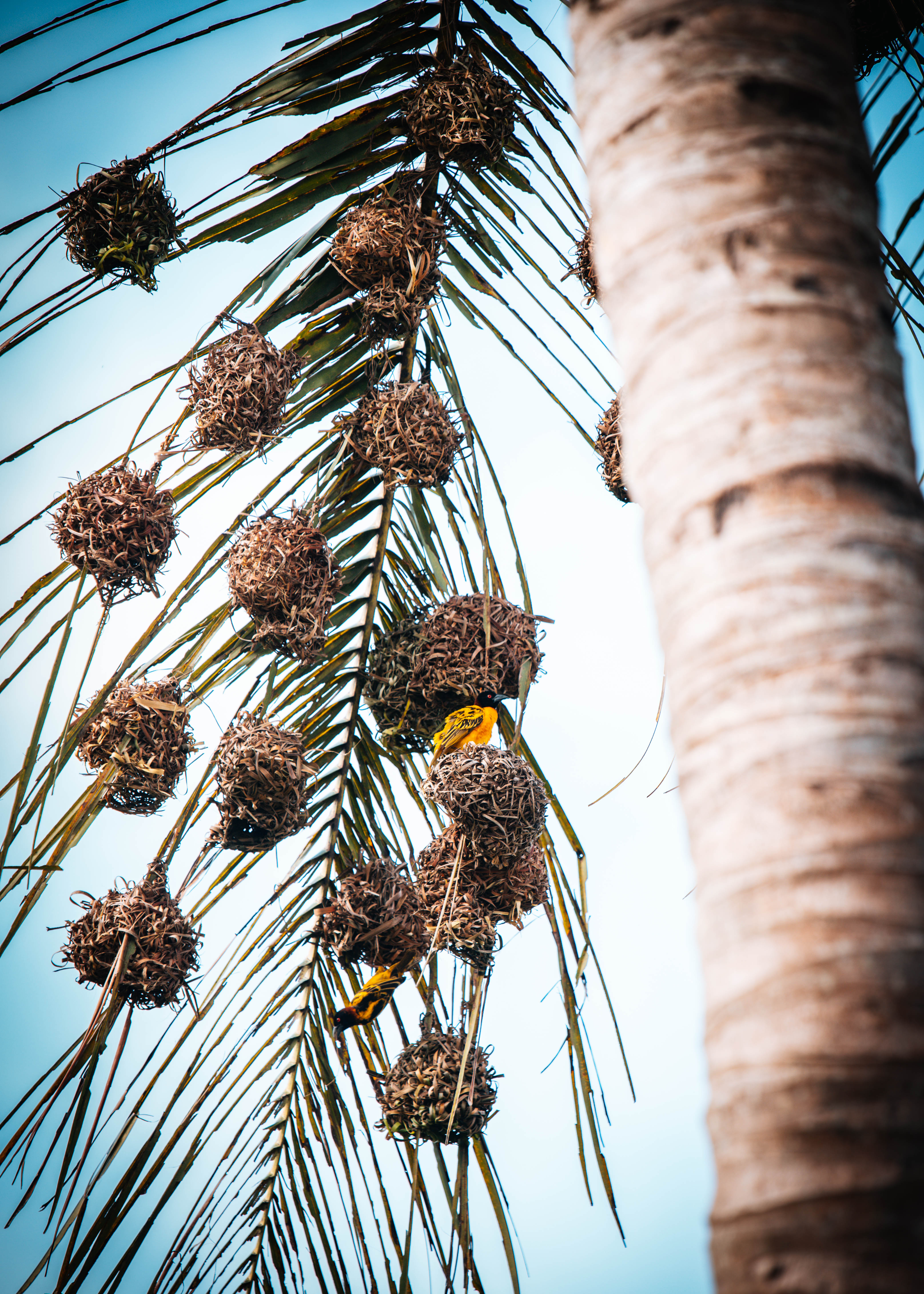
A village weaver among a group of nests on the palm leaf of a tree

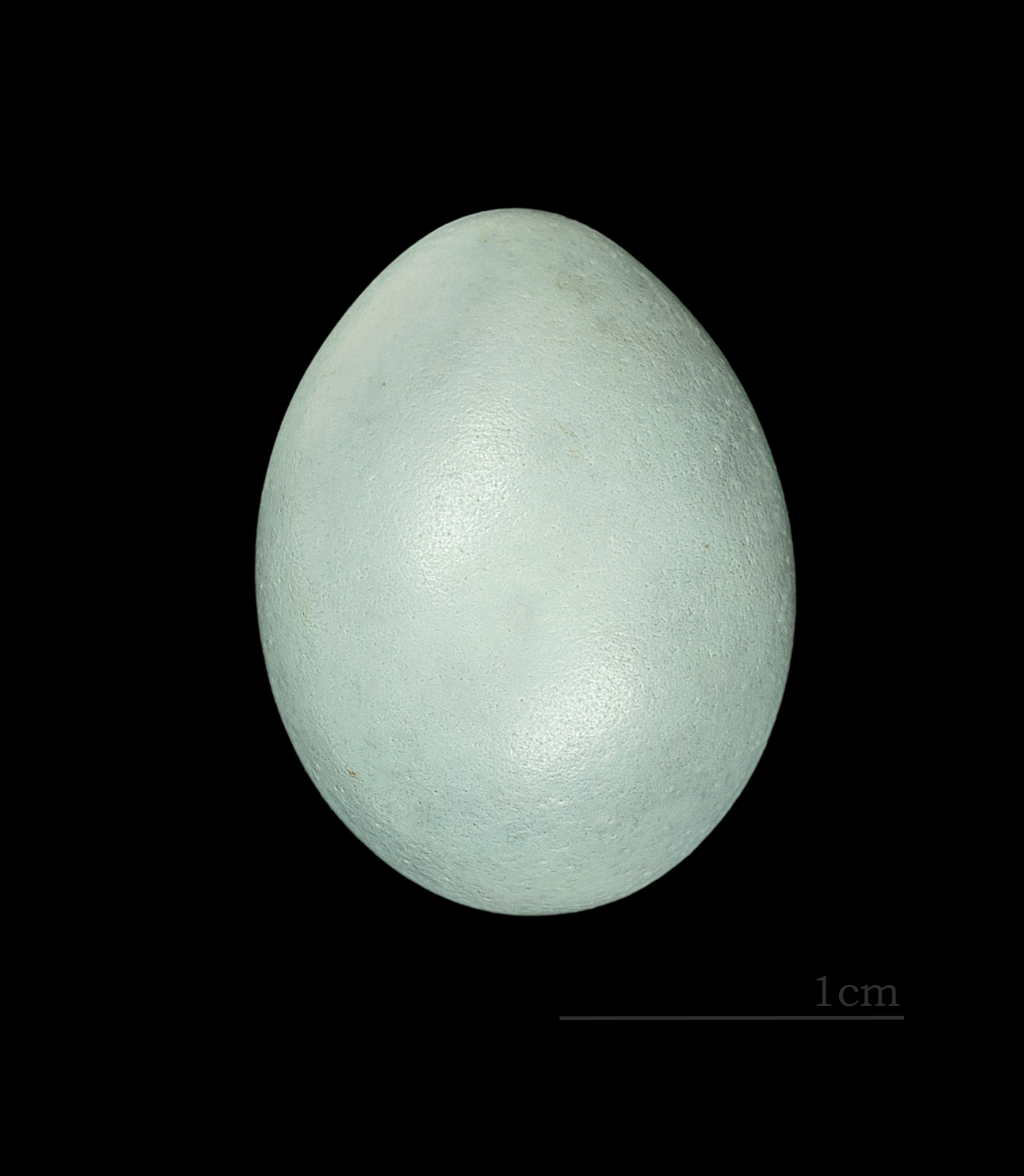
Egg MHNT

Male building its nest in Bubaque, Guinea Bissau
