= Quartier de Bonne-Nouvelle =

Coordinates: 48.8638613°N 2.3464827°E

Bonne-Nouvelle
- Quartier de Bonne-Nouvelle
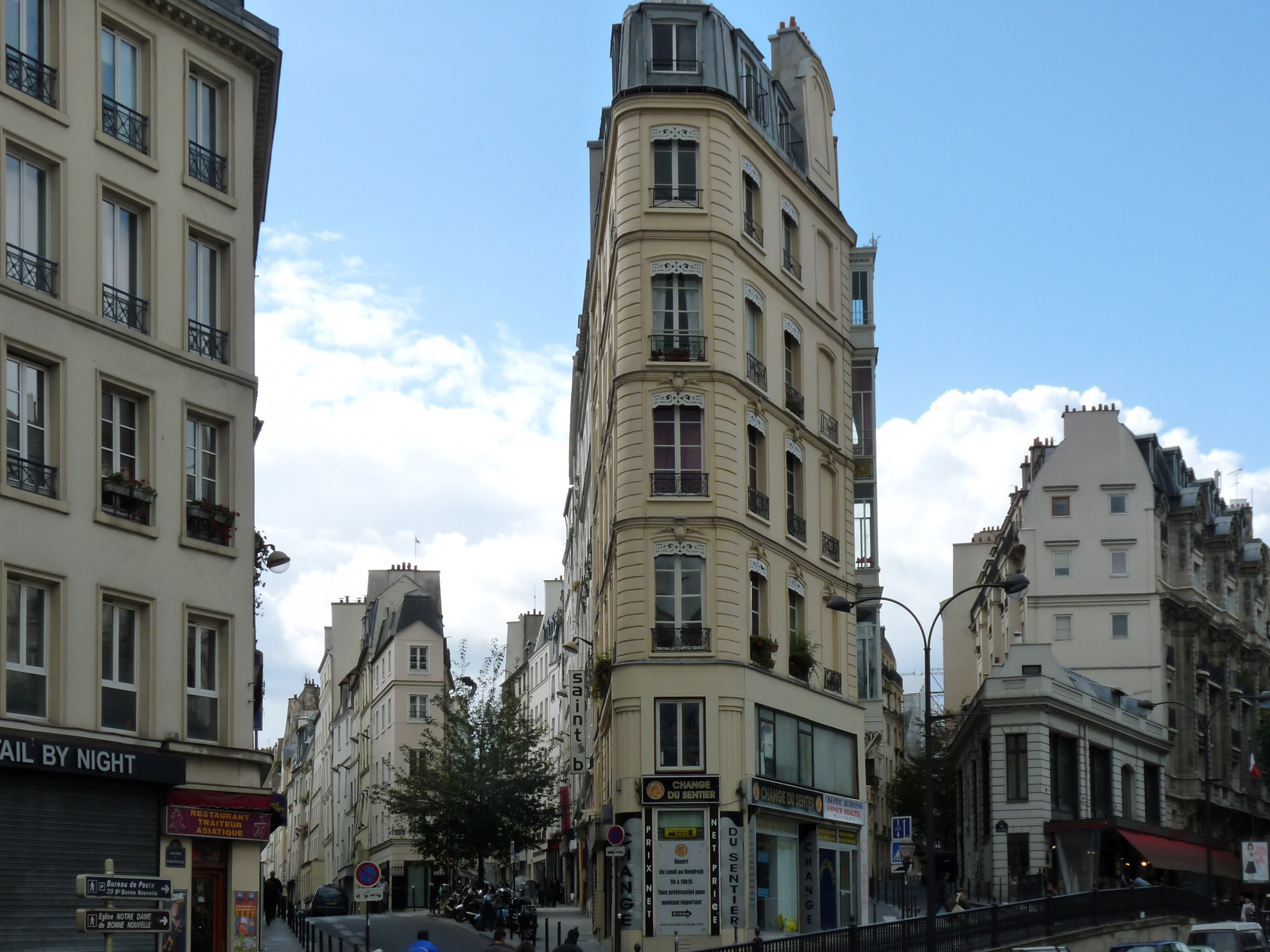
- Butte de Bonne Nouvelle
- Interactive map of Bonne-Nouvelle
- Country: France
- Region: Île-de-France
- Ville: Paris
- Arrondissement: 2nd

Area
  - Total: 0.282 km^{2} (0.109 sq mi)

Population (2016)
  - Total: 9,374
  - Density: 33,241/km^{2} (86,090/sq mi)

The Quartier de Bonne-Nouvelle is the 8th administrative district of Paris, in the 2nd arrondissement.

== Boundaries ==
The quarter of the 2nd arrondissement.

The Bonne-Nouvelle administrative district is bounded:

- to the south by a section of Rue Étienne-Marcel east of Rue Montorgueil;
- to the east by the section of Boulevard de Sébastopol north of Rue Étienne-Marcel;
- to the north by the section of Boulevard Saint-Denis between Boulevard de Sébastopol and Boulevard de Bonne-Nouvelle;
- to the west by Rue Poissonnière, Rue des Petits-Carreaux, and—in part—Rue Montorgueil north of Rue Étienne-Marcel.

It covers an area of 28.2 hectares.

It includes:

- to the north, the Butte de Bonne-Nouvelle, which gave the entire district its name. This elevation lies between the former Wall of Charles V (demolished in 1633)—which followed the line of the current Rue de Cléry and Rue d'Aboukir—and Bastion 6 of the Fossés Jaunes wall, built during the same period on the site of the current Boulevard de Bonne-Nouvelle.
- between Boulevard Saint-Denis, Rue d'Aboukir, Boulevard de Sébastopol, and Rue de Réaumur, a very densely built-up area that—along with the butte Bonne-Nouvelle and the space between Rue Montmartre and Rue Poissonnière (in the northern part of the neighboring Quartier du Mail)—forms the area commonly known as "Le Sentier".
- south of Rue Réaumur, an area that is also very densely built up; it was urbanized starting in the 13th century, just north of the Wall of Philip II Augustus, the path of which ran close to Rue Étienne-Marcel.

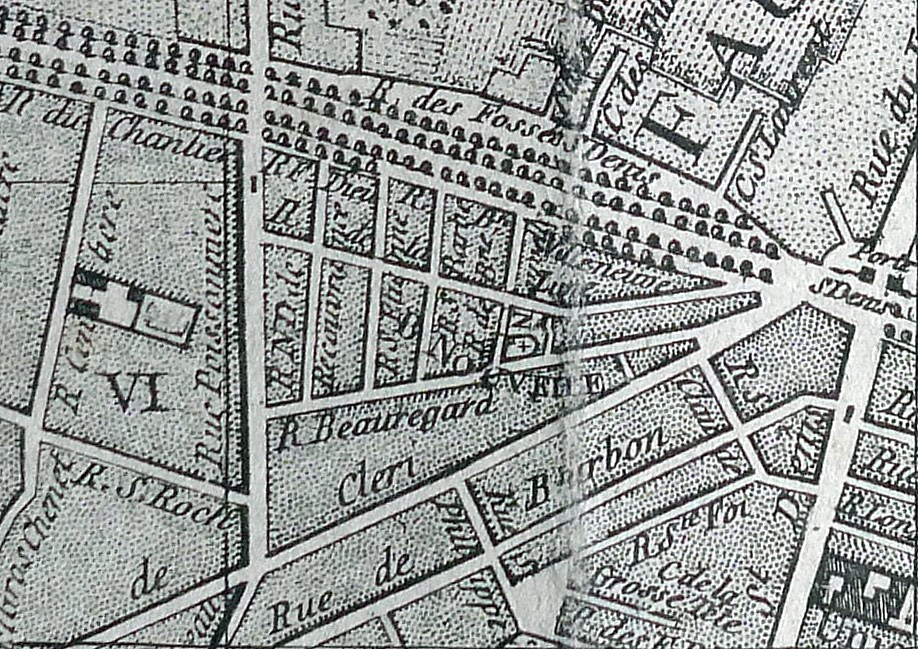
Quartier de Bonne-Nouvelle in 1760 (Vaugondy map).

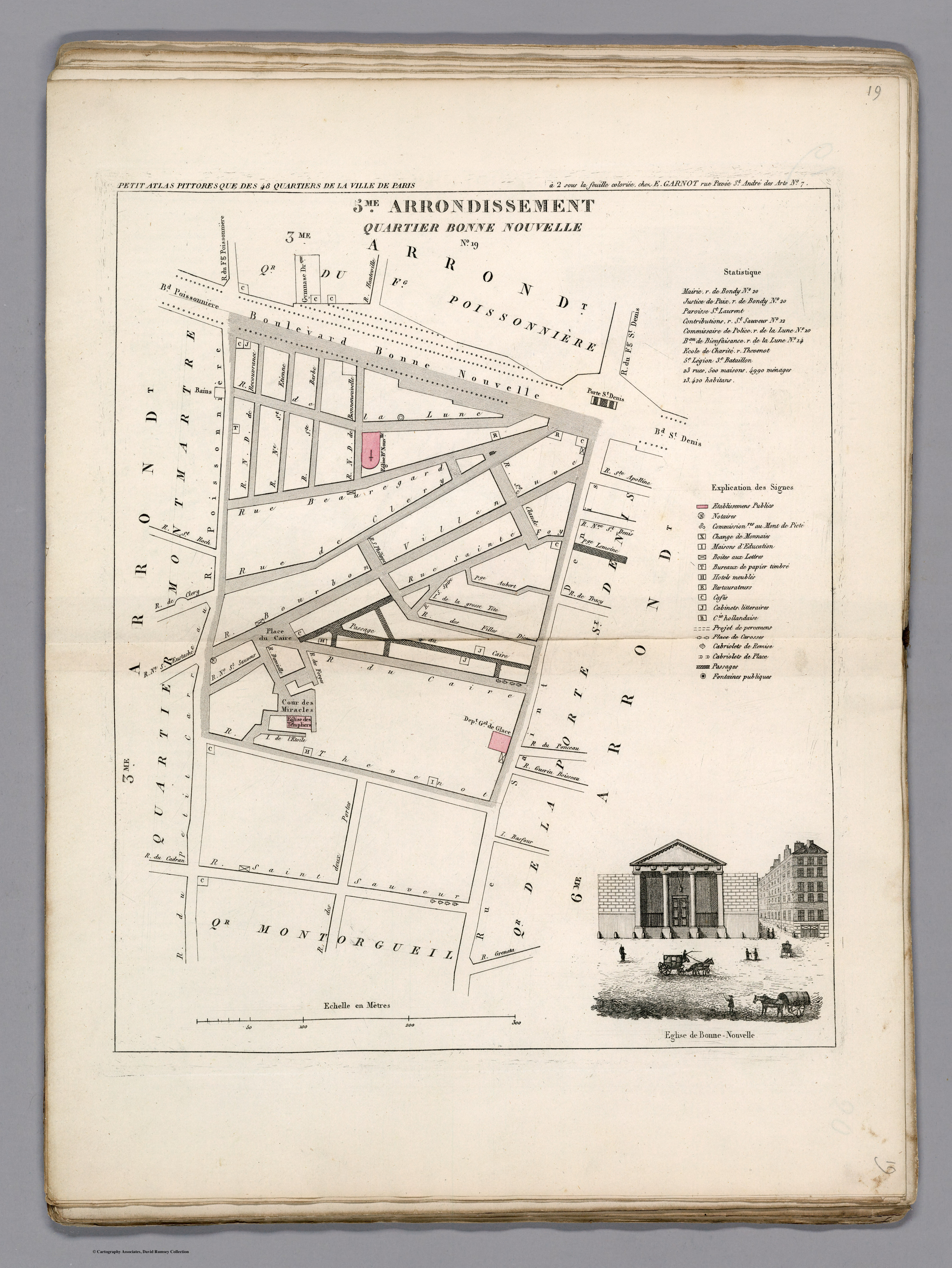
Map of the Quartier de Bonne Nouvelle in the former 5th arrondissement of Paris in 1834.

== Bibliography ==
- Jacques Hillairet, Connaissance du vieux Paris : rive droite, rive gauche, les îles & les villages, Paris, Éditions Payot & Rivages, 1993 (1re éd. 1956), 377-299-255, 3 t. en 1 vol. (ISBN 978-2-86930-648-6).
- Renaud Gagneux et Denis Prouvost, Sur les traces des enceintes de Paris. Promenades au long des murs disparus, Paris, Parigramme, 2004, 288 p. (ISBN 2-84096-322-1).
- Werner Szambien et Simona Talenti, Le Sentier-Bonne Nouvelle, de l'architecture à la mode, Paris, Action artistique de la Ville de Paris, 1999, 214 p. (ISBN 2-913246-01-X).
