= Rue Réaumur =

Street in Paris, France

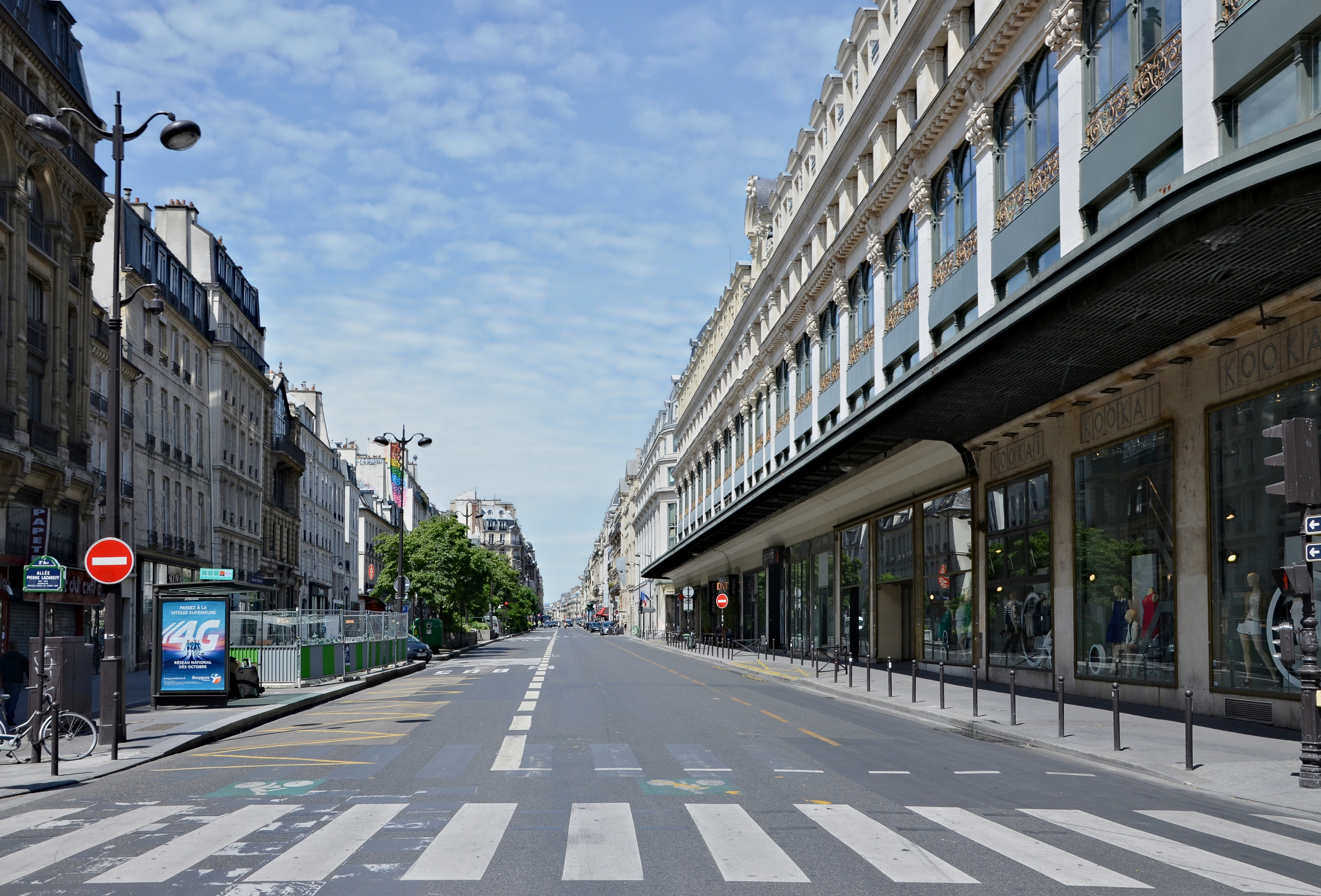
- Rue Réaumur in 2013

- Location within Paris
- Length: 1,345 m (4,413 ft)
- Width: 22 m (72 ft)
- Arrondissement: 2nd, 3rd
- Quarter: Quartier des Arts-et-Métiers, Quartier de Bonne-Nouvelle, Quartier du Mail
- Coordinates: 48°52′1.92″N 2°20′52.98″E
- From: rue du Temple
- To: rue Notre-Dame-des-Victoires

The Rue Réaumur is a street in the 2nd and 3rd arrondissements of Paris.

== Location and access ==
This location is positioned at the metro stations Arts et Métiers, Réaumur-Sébastopol, Sentier, and Bourse.

== Origin of the name ==
It owes its name to the French physicist and naturalist René Antoine Ferchault de Réaumur (1683–1757).

== Notable buildings and sites of memory ==
Numerous buildings dating from the late 19th and early 20th centuries boast majestic facades. The restrictions on facade uniformity imposed by Baron Haussmann have been lifted, and architects and sculptors compete to create them. The Musée des Arts et Métiers, founded in 1794 and dedicated to science and technology, is located at number 60.
