= Rue d'Aboukir =

Street in Paris, France

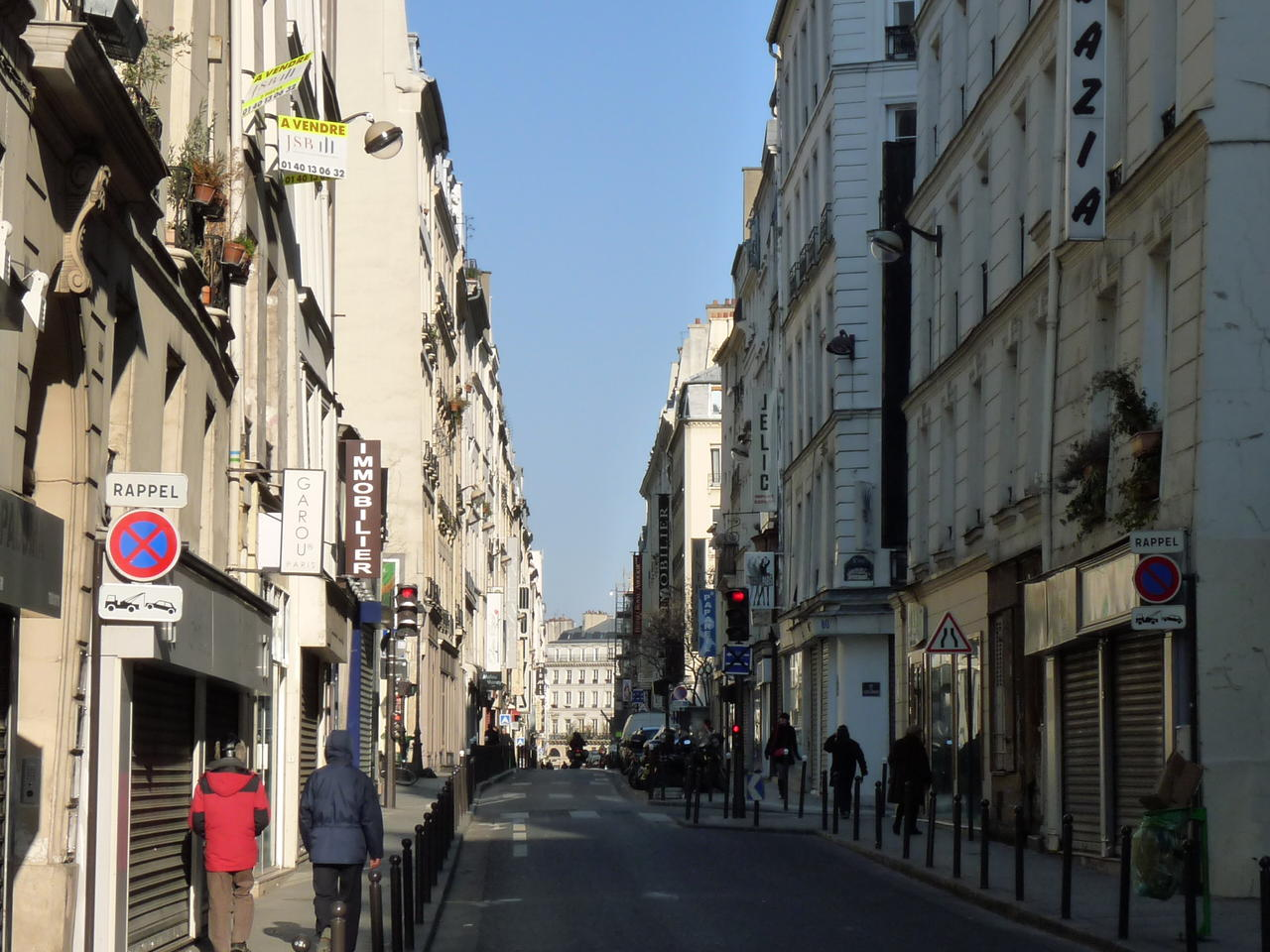
- Interactive map of Rue d'Aboukir
- Location: Paris, France
- Arrondissement: 2nd
- Quarter: Mail
- Nearest metro station: Sentier; Strasbourg–Saint-Denis
- Coordinates: 48.867838°N 2.347185°E

Rue d’Aboukir is a street in the 2nd arrondissement of Paris.

== History ==
This street, originally named differently, was created in the second half of the 17th century, corresponding to the expansion of Paris to the north and northwest, well beyond the initial core around the île de la Cité. This street is located on the former sentry walk and on the moats of one of the medieval walls of Paris, the wall of Charles V, which has left very few traces.

== Name Origin ==
The name of Cairo was then given to it in 1807 in memory of a victory during the battles of Aboukir, more precisely on July 25, 1799 during the Egyptian campaign.

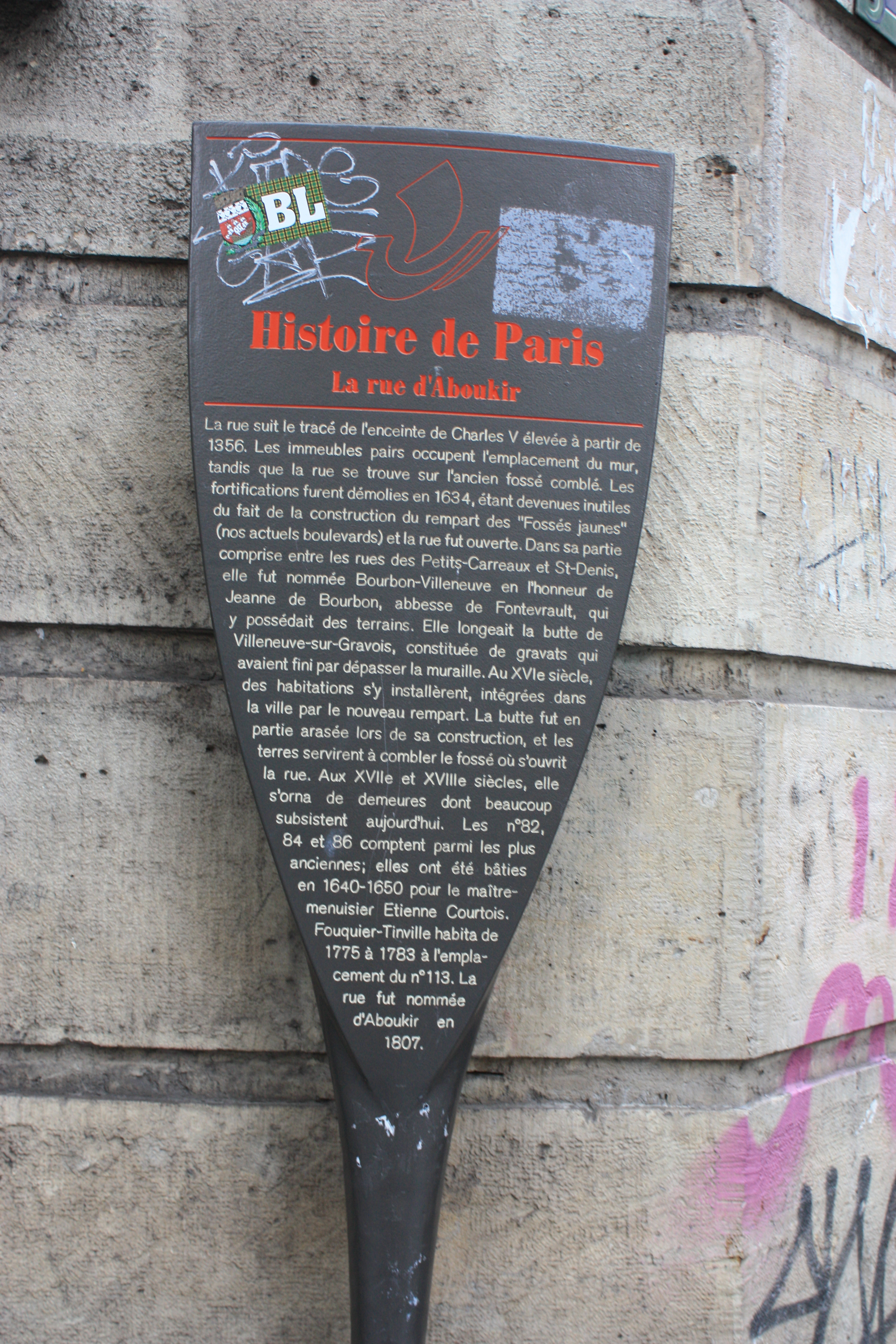
History of Paris panel on the street.
