= Quatre-Septembre station =

Metro station in Paris, France

Quatre-Septembre
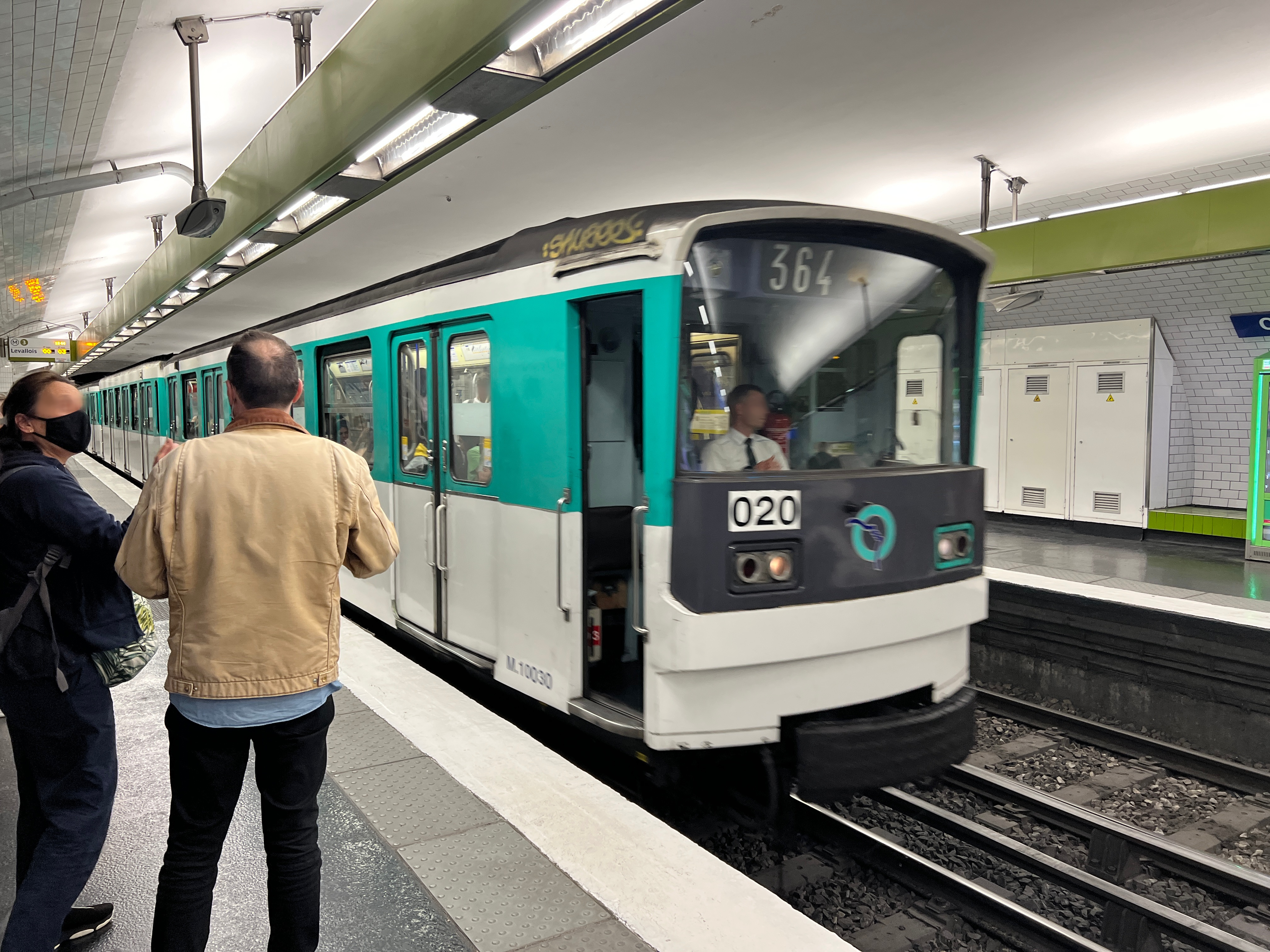

General information
- Location: 20, rue du Quatre-Septembre; 2nd arrondissement of Paris; Île-de-France; France
- Coordinates: 48°52′10″N 2°20′12″E
- Owner: RATP
- Operator: RATP

Other information
- Fare zone: 1

History
- Opened: 19 October 1904

Services
| Preceding station | Paris Metro | Following station |
|---|---|---|
| Opéra towards Pont de Levallois–Bécon | Line 3 | Bourse towards Gallieni |
Location
- Location within Paris

Quatre-Septembre (French pronunciation: [katʁ(ə) sɛptɑ̃bʁ]) is a station on Paris Métro Line 3 located in the 2nd arrondissement of Paris. It is named for the date of 4 September 1870, the date Napoleon III fell and the Third French Republic was proclaimed.

== Location ==
The station is located under Rue du Quatre-Septembre, between Rue de Gramont and Rue de Choiseul. Oriented approximately along an east–west axis, it is located between the Opéra and Bourse stations.

== History ==
The line opened in October 1904, when the first section of Line 3 began service between the Avenue de Villiers (today the station is known as simply Villiers) and Père Lachaise. The station opened on 3 November 1904, three weeks after the first section of line 3 went into service. Until then, trains passed it without stopping there.

Situated on the Rue du 4 Septembre, the station commemorates the date of 4 September 1870, when Léon Gambetta proclaimed the beginning of the French Third Republic from the palace of the Tuileries, after the capture of French emperor Napoleon III by German armies during the Franco-Prussian War.

Like a third of the stations in the network between 1974 and 1984, the platforms were modernized in the Andreu-Motte style, green in colour with flat white tiles in this case. As part of the RATP's Metro Renewal program, the station's corridors were renovated on 16 May 2003.

On 1 April 2016, half of the nameplates on the station's platforms were replaced by the RATP to create an April Fool's joke for a day, as in twelve other stations. Quatre-Septembre is humorously renamed Premier Avril.

In 2019, 1,997,741 travelers entered this station which places it at the 246th position of the metro stations for its traffic out of 302.

The station opened on 3 November 1904, three weeks after the first section of line 3 went into service between Avenue de Villiers (today Villiers) and Père Lachaise. Until then, trains crossed it without stopping there.

== Passenger services ==
=== Access ===
The station has a single access entitled Rue du Quatre-Septembre, opening at the right of the number 20 of the same street, at the corner of Rue Choiseul and Monsigny. Made up of a fixed staircase, it is adorned with a Guimard iron edicule, which is the subject of a decree as a historic monument on 29 May 1978.

=== Station layout ===
Street Level

| B1 | Mezzanine |

| Line 3 platforms | Side platform, doors will open on the right |
| Line 3 platforms | Westbound | ← toward Pont de Levallois – Bécon (Opéra) |
| Line 3 platforms | Eastbound | toward Gallieni (Bourse) → |
| Line 3 platforms | Side platform, doors will open on the right |

=== Platforms ===
Quatre-Septembre is a standard configuration station. It has two platforms separated by the metro tracks and the vault is elliptical. The decoration is in the Andreu-Motte style with two bright green light canopies, benches covered with flat green tiling and white Motte seats, which thus break the colorimetric uniformity of the decorative style. These arrangements are married with the flat white ceramic tiles which cover the walls and the tunnel exits, while the vault is painted in white. The outlets of the corridors are treated with classic bevelled white tiles. The advertising frames are metallic, and the name of the station is written in Parisine font on enamelled plates.

=== Bus services ===
The station is served by lines 20, 29, 39, 67, 74 and 85 of the RATP Bus Network and, at night, by lines N15 and N16 of the Noctilien network.

== Culture ==
Filming location for the Hollywood movie The Tourist (2010 film) with Angelina Jolie on site.

The song Station Quatre Septembre, written and composed by Benjamin Biolay, and interpreted by Vanessa Paradis on her album Love Songs, seems to evoke the station. Biolay also took over the song himself.

== Gallery ==
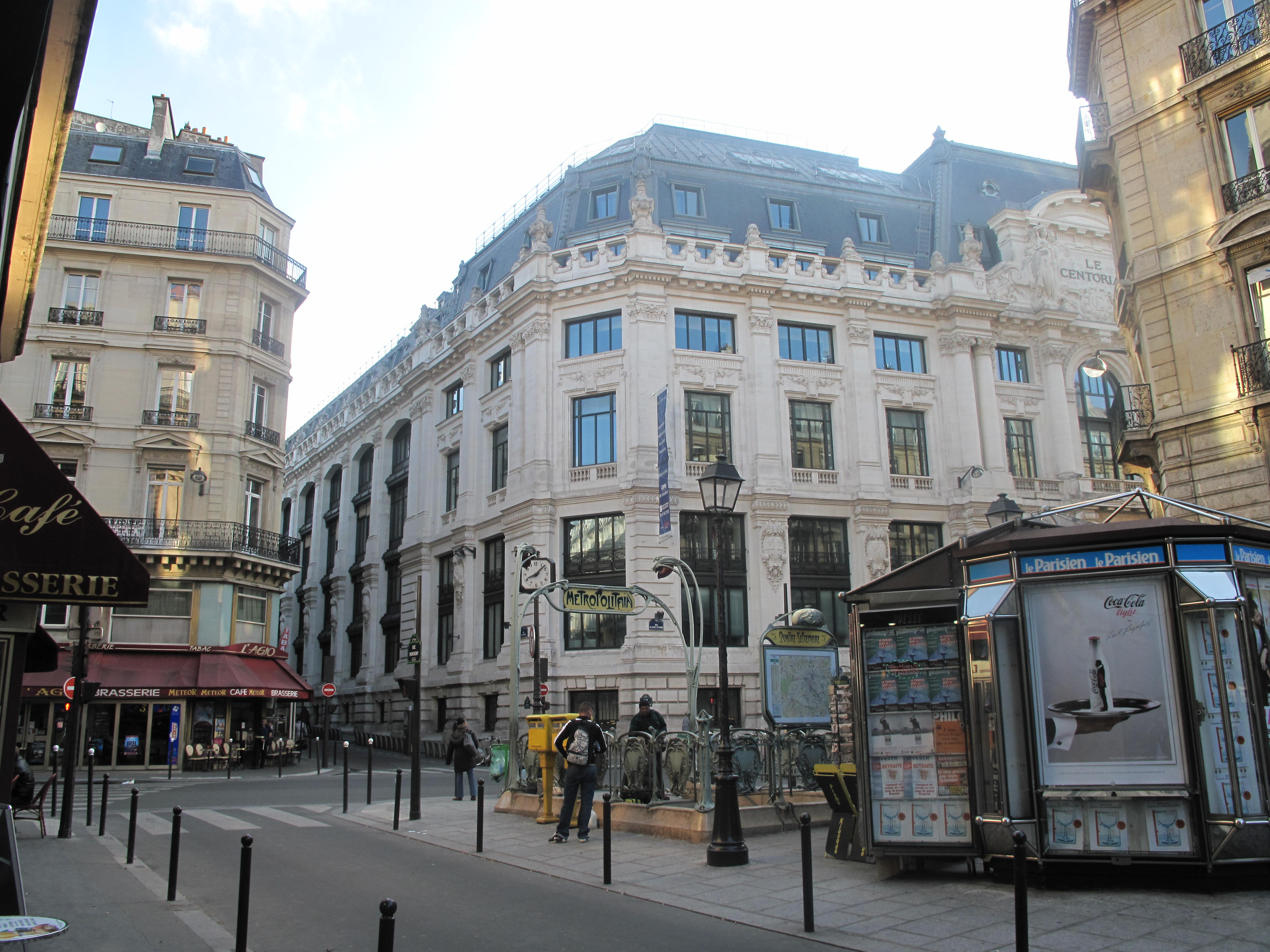
Street-level entrance at Quatre-Septembre

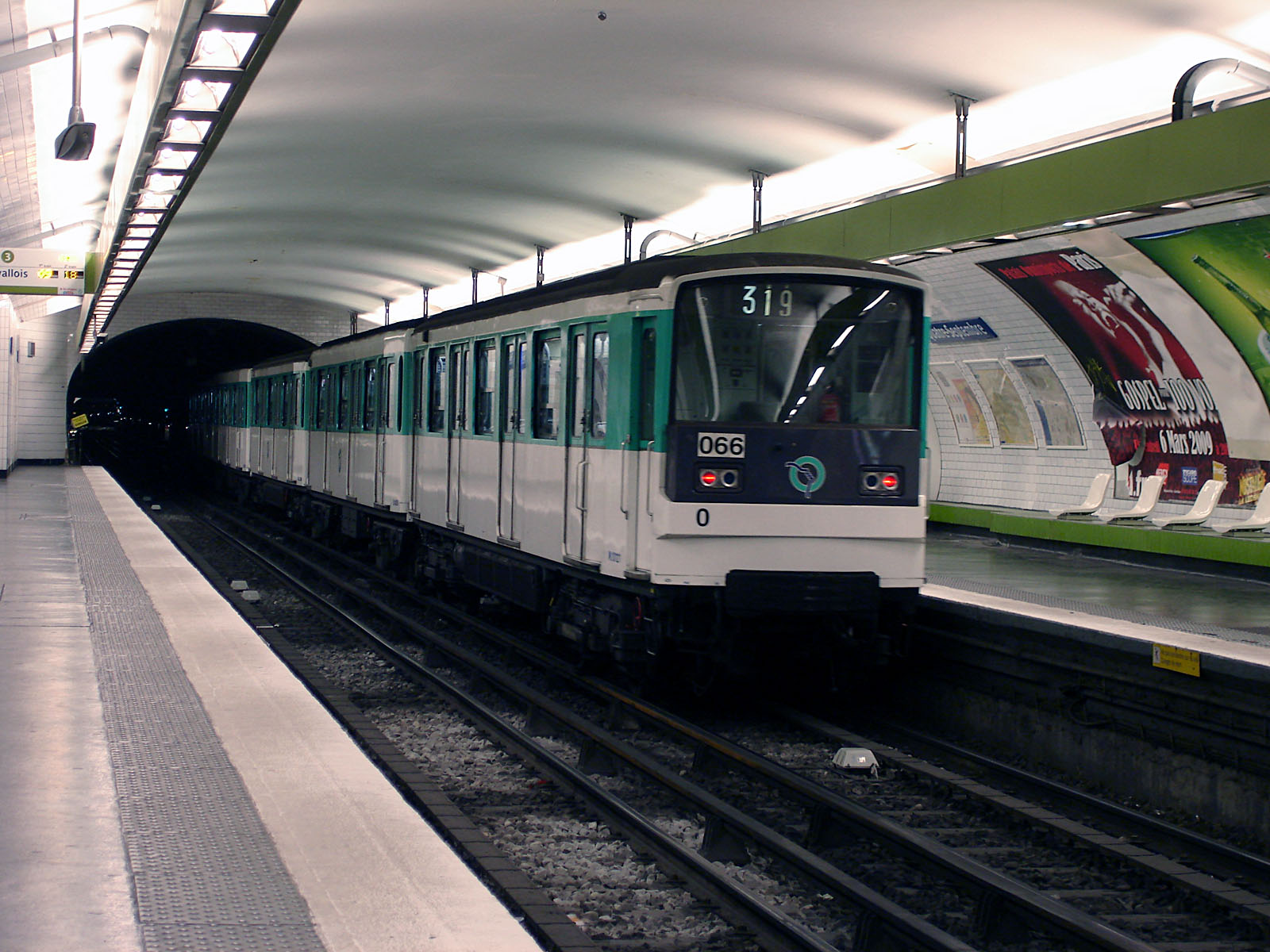
MF 67 rolling stock on Line 3 at Quatre-Septembre
