= Sentier station =

Metro station in Paris, France

Sentier
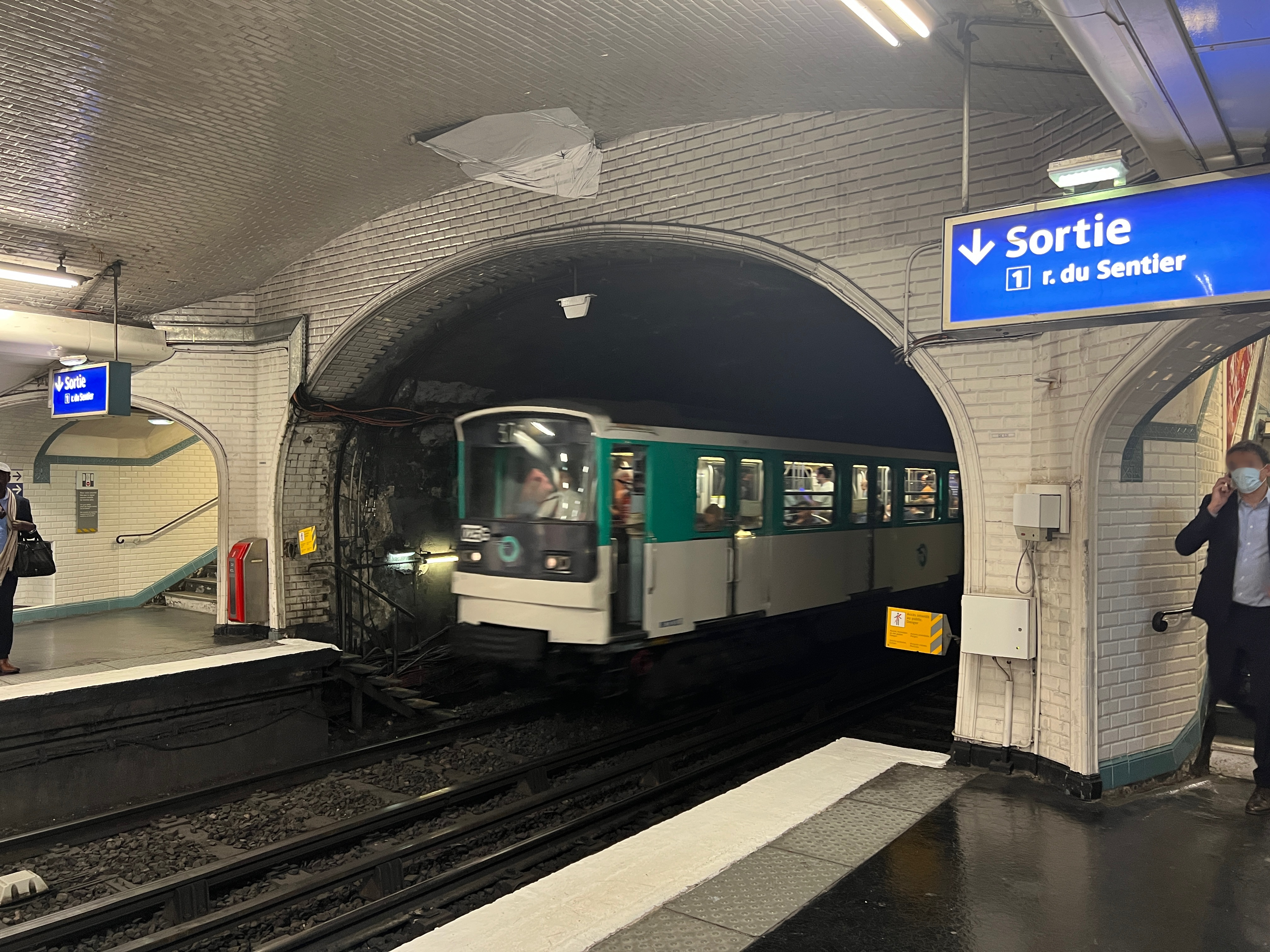
- MF 67 arriving at Sentier

General information
- Location: 97, Rue Réaumur; 21, Rue des Petits Carreaux; 2nd arrondissement of Paris; Île-de-France; France
- Coordinates: 48°52′03″N 2°20′47″E
- Owner: RATP
- Operator: RATP

Other information
- Fare zone: 1

History
- Opened: 20 November 1904

Services
Preceding station	Paris Metro	Following station
Bourse towards Pont de Levallois–Bécon	Line 3	Réaumur–Sébastopol towards Gallieni
Location
- Location within Paris

Sentier (French pronunciation: [sɑ̃tje]) is a station on Line 3 of the Paris Métro in the 2nd arrondissement.

== Location ==
The station is located under Rue Réaumur, at the intersection with Rue de Cléry and Rue du Sentier. Oriented, approximately, along an east–west axis, it is located between the Bourse and Réaumur - Sébastopol stations.

== History ==
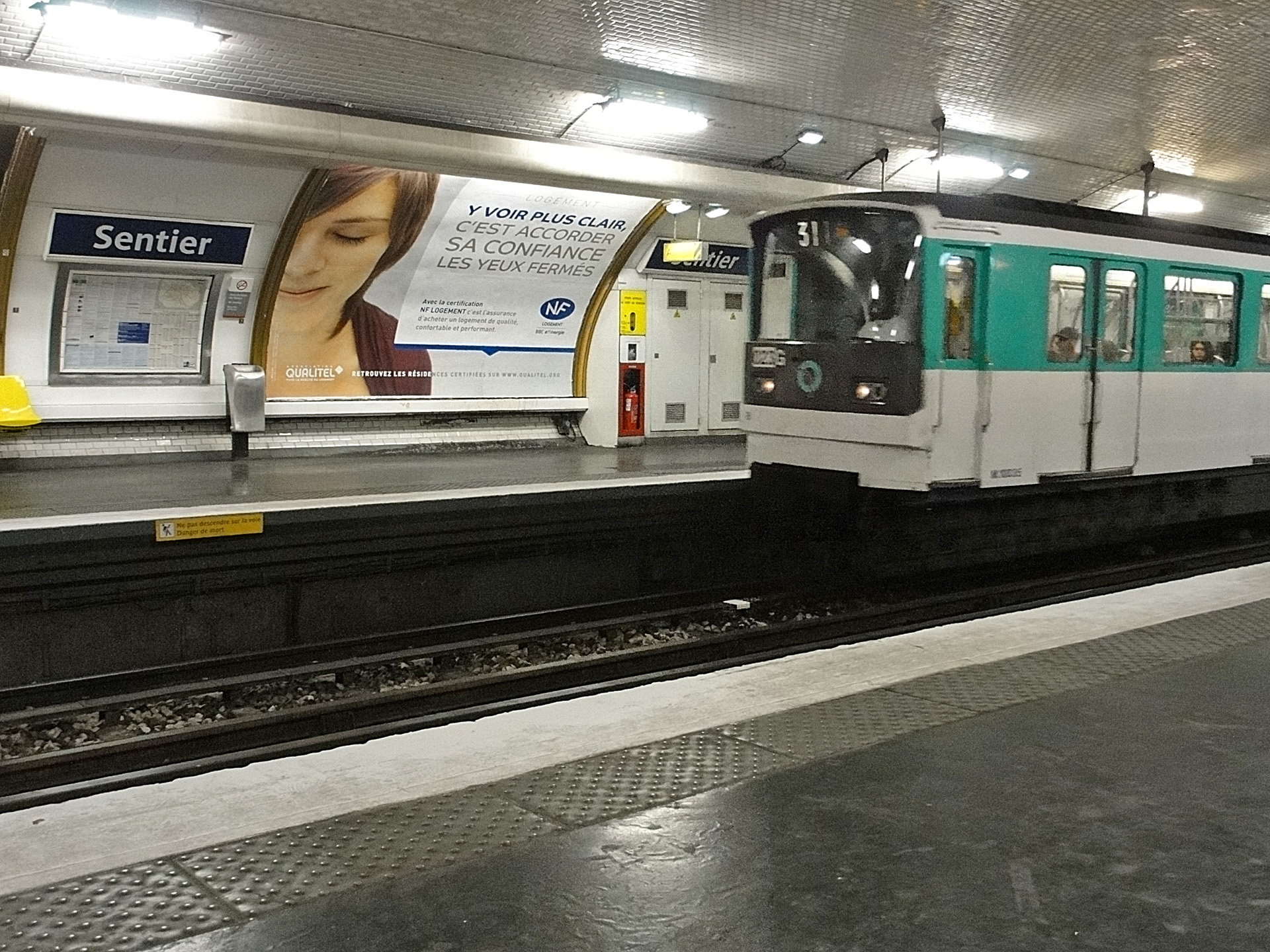
Station platforms

The station opened on 20 November 1904 as part of the first section of the line between Père Lachaise and Villiers, which opened a month earlier. The station is named after a path (French: Sentier) leading to the city's fortifications, now called the Rue du Sentier, which gave its name to the Sentier district, known until recently for the activities in the textile trades that developed there from the 1950s. The station is one of the few to have its entrance incorporated into the front of a building. A secondary entrance is located 87 Rue Réaumur; it contains railings designed by Hector Guimard and is listed as a monument historique.

Since the 1960s, the platforms have been adorned with metallic bodywork with white surrounds; this technique was then widely used in network stopping points as an inexpensive way to modernize them quickly.

As part of the RATP's Renouveau du métro program, the station's corridors were renovated on 16 May 2003.

On 20 March 2018, half of the nameplates on the station's platforms were temporarily replaced by the RATP to celebrate the arrival of spring, in parallel with the distribution of flowers to users, as in five other stations. The new plaques represented a wooden sign decorated with plants, on which the station's patronym is engraved in capital letters.

In 2019, 3,420,249 travelers entered this station which placed it at the 146th position of the metro stations for its usage.

== Passenger services ==
=== Access ===
The station has two exits leading to Rue Réaumur:

- entrance 1 - Rue du Sentier, being among the few in the network to be established in a building, in this case within no. 97 Rue Réaumur, and having a unique signage dating from the 1930s;
- entrance 2 - Rue des Petits-Carreaux, adorned with a Guimard edicule which is listed as a historic monument. Located at the right of 87 Rue Réaumur at the end of Rue des Petits-Carreaux.

=== Station layout ===
Street Level

B1	Mezzanine

Platform level	Side platform, doors will open on the right
Platform level	Westbound	← toward Pont de Levallois – Bécon (Bourse)
Platform level	Eastbound	toward Gallieni (Réaumur – Sébastopol) →
Platform level	Side platform, doors will open on the right

=== Platforms ===
Sentier is a standard configuration station. It has two platforms separated by the metro tracks and the vault is elliptical. Since the 1950s, the walls have been covered with a metallic bodywork with white horizontal uprights and light golden advertising frames. This arrangement is completed by yellow Motte style seats. The bevelled white ceramic tiles cover the walls, the vault, and the tunnel exits. Lighting is provided by independent fluorescent tubes and the name of the station is written in Parisine font on enamelled plates incorporated into the bodywork.

=== Bus services ===
The station is served by lines 20 and 39 of the RATP Bus Network.
