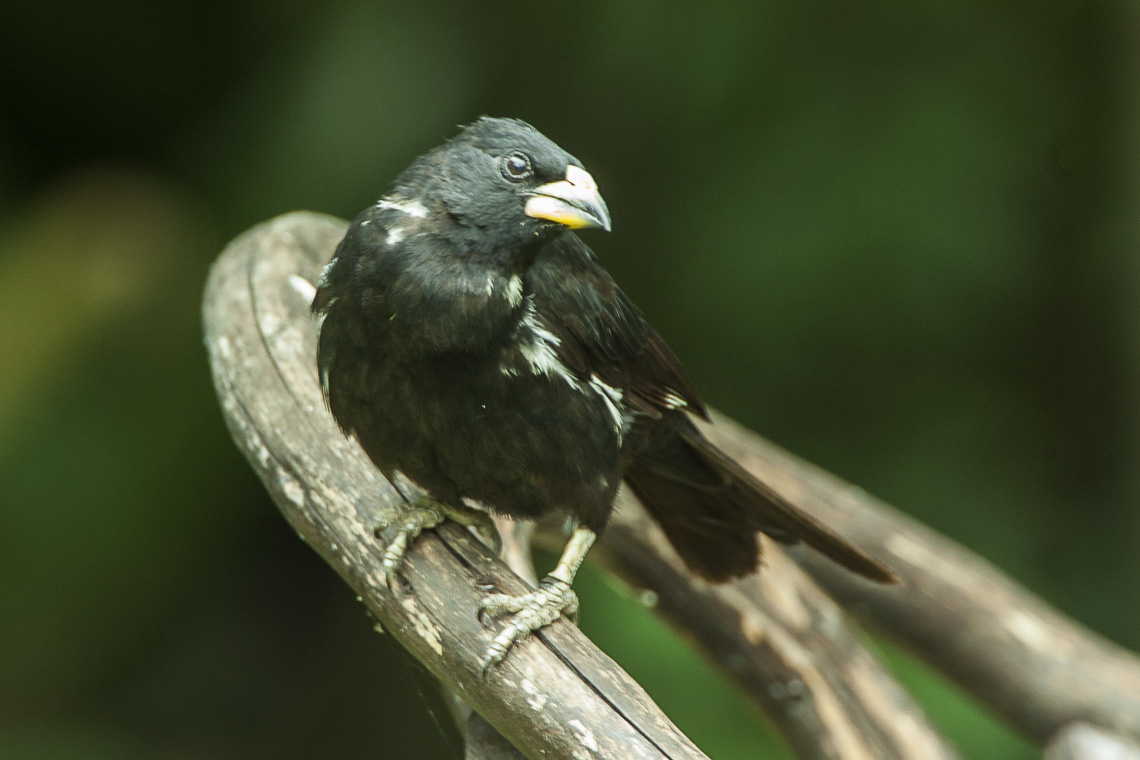

Conservation status
- Least Concern (IUCN 3.1)

Scientific classification
- Kingdom: Animalia
- Phylum: Chordata
- Class: Aves
- Order: Passeriformes
- Family: Ploceidae
- Genus: Bubalornis
- Species: B. albirostris

Binomial name
- Bubalornis albirostris (Vieillot, 1817)

= White-billed buffalo weaver =

Species of bird

The white-billed buffalo weaver (Bubalornis albirostris) is a resident breeding bird species in most of Africa south of the Sahara Desert.

This common weaver occurs in open country, especially cultivation and scrub. It is a communal breeder, building massive untidy stick nests in tree colonies, each of which may have several spherical woven nests within. Two to four eggs are laid.

The white-billed buffalo weaver is large and stocky, commonly measuring 23 to 24 centimeters. The adult is mainly black with white flecking on the back and wings. The conical bill is very thick, and appears more so because it is surmounted by a white frontal shield. The bill is white in breeding males.

The adult female and non-breeding male are similar, but the bill is black. Young birds are dark brown in plumage.

The white-billed buffalo weaver is a gregarious species which feeds on grain and insects. This is a noisy bird, especially in colonies, with a range of cackles and squeaks.

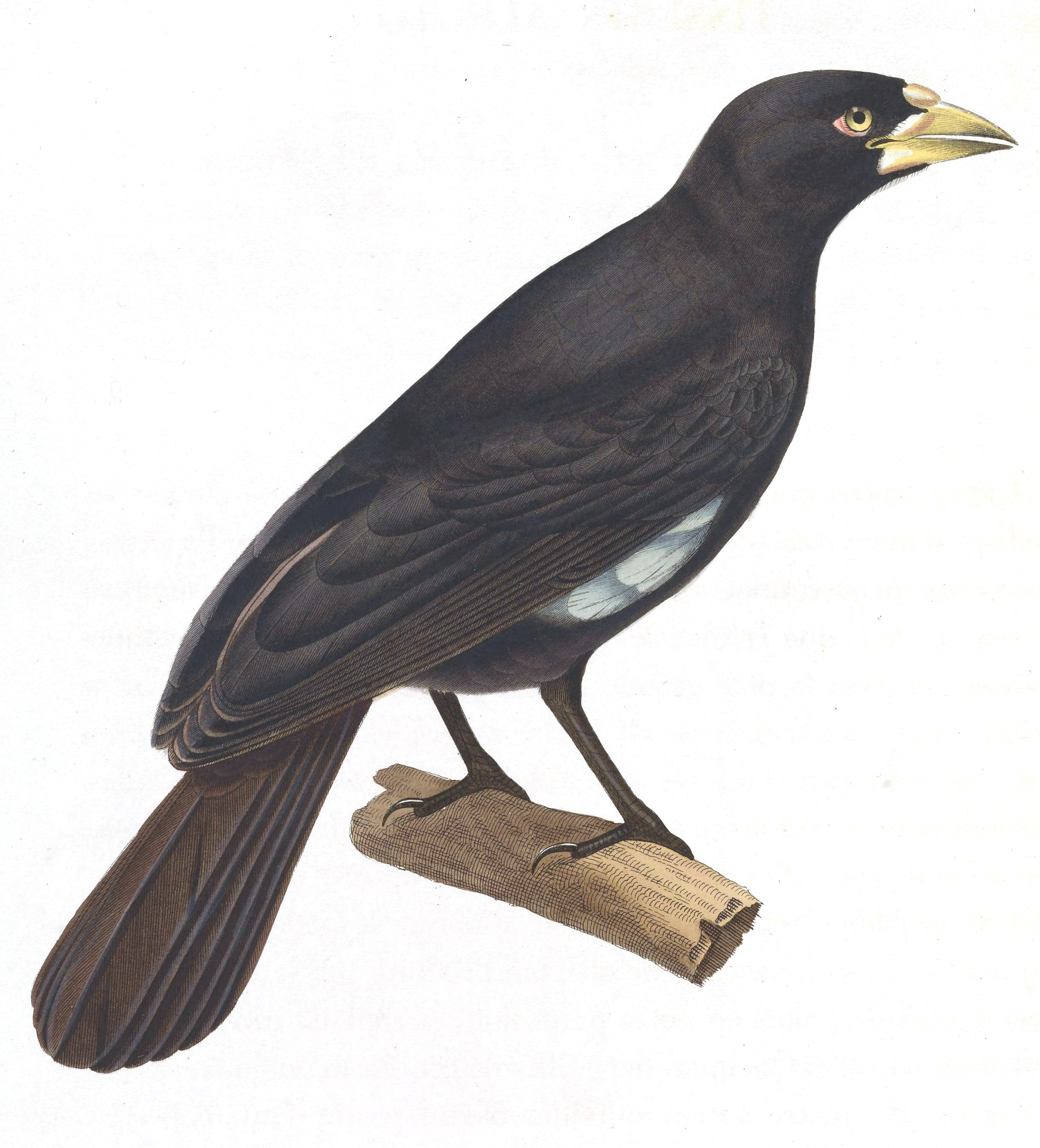
Illustration by Jean-Gabriel Prêtre
