= René Antoine Ferchault de Réaumur =

French entomologist and writer (1683–1757)

Réaumur
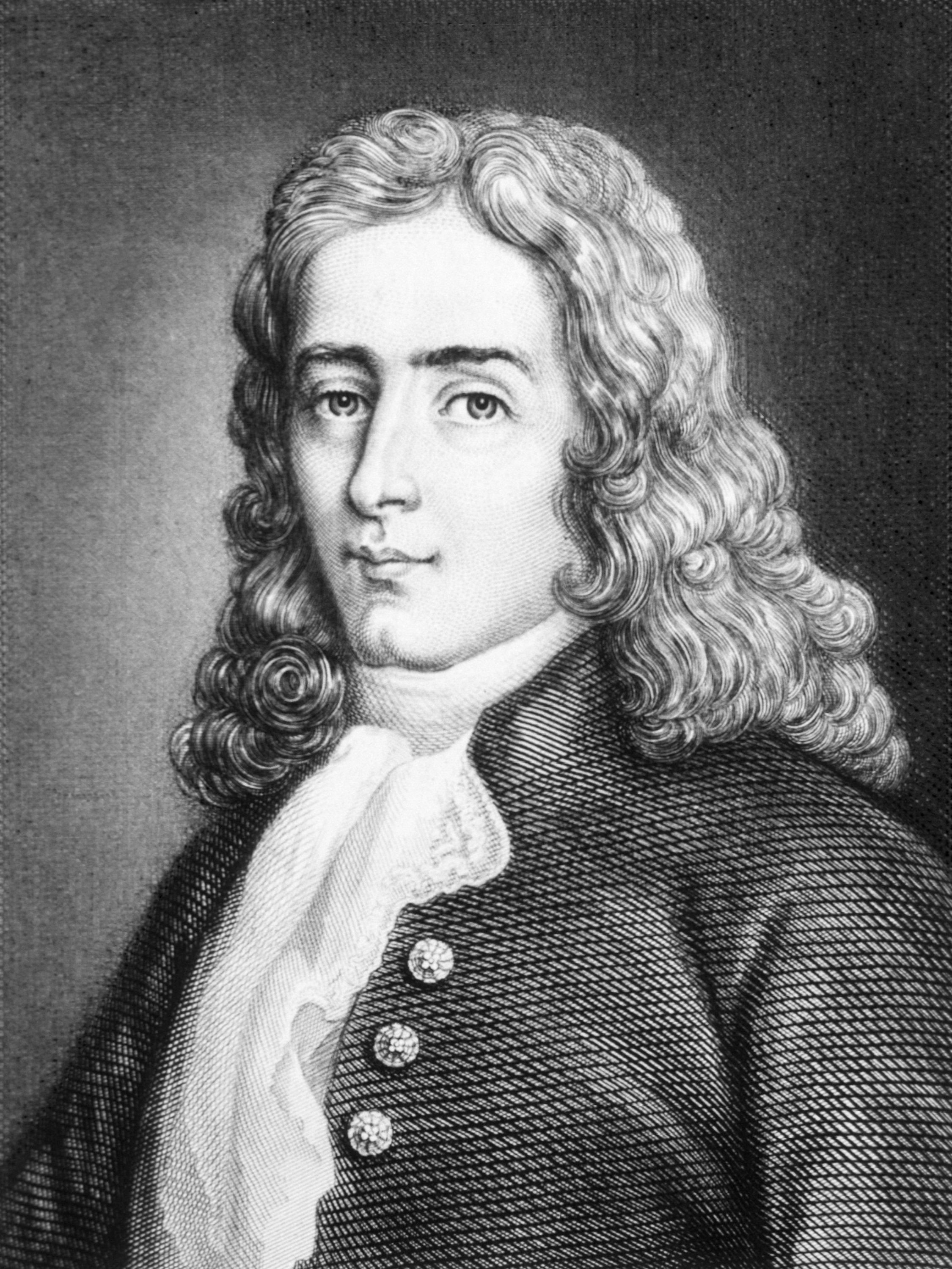
- Line engraving by Gustav Metzeroth, 1859
- Born: 28 February 1683; La Rochelle, Aunis, Kingdom of France
- Died: 17 October 1757 (aged 74); Saint-Julien-du-Terroux, Kingdom of France
- Known for: Temperature scale named after him, founder of ethology
- Awards: Member of the Académie des Sciences; royal and military Order of Saint Louis; Fellow of the Royal Society; Royal Swedish Academy of Sciences
- Scientific career
- Fields: Entomology
- Patrons: Pierre Varignon

René Antoine Ferchault de Réaumur (/ˈreɪəˌmjʊər/; French: [ʁeomyʁ]; 28 February 1683 – 17 October 1757) was a French entomologist and writer who contributed to many different fields, especially the study of insects. He introduced the Réaumur temperature scale.

== Life ==
Réaumur was born in a prominent La Rochelle family and educated in Paris. He learned philosophy in the Jesuits' college at Poitiers, and in 1699 went to Bourges to study civil law and mathematics under the charge of an uncle, canon of La Sainte-Chapelle. In 1703 he went to Paris, where he continued the study of mathematics and physics. In 1708, at the age of 24, he was nominated by Pierre Varignon (who taught him mathematics) and elected a member of the Académie des Sciences. From this time onwards for nearly half a century hardly a year passed in which the Mémoires de l'Académie did not contain at least one paper by Réaumur.

At first, his attention was occupied by mathematical studies, especially in geometry. In 1710, he was named the chief editor of the Descriptions of the Arts and Trades, a major government project which resulted in the establishment of manufactures new to France and the revival of neglected industries. For discoveries regarding iron and steel he was awarded a pension of 12,000 livres. Content with his ample private income, he requested that the money should go to the Académie des Sciences for the furtherance of experiments on improved industrial processes. In 1731 he became interested in meteorology, and invented the thermometer scale which bears his name: the Réaumur. In 1735, for family reasons, he accepted the post of commander and intendant of the royal and military Order of Saint Louis. He discharged his duties with scrupulous attention, but refused the pay. He took great delight in the systematic study of natural history. His friends often called him "the Pliny of the 18th century".

He loved retirement and lived at his country residences, including his chateau La Bermondière, Saint-Julien-du-Terroux, Maine, where he had a serious fall from a horse, which led to his death. He bequeathed his manuscripts, which filled 138 portfolios, and his natural history collections to the Académie des Sciences.

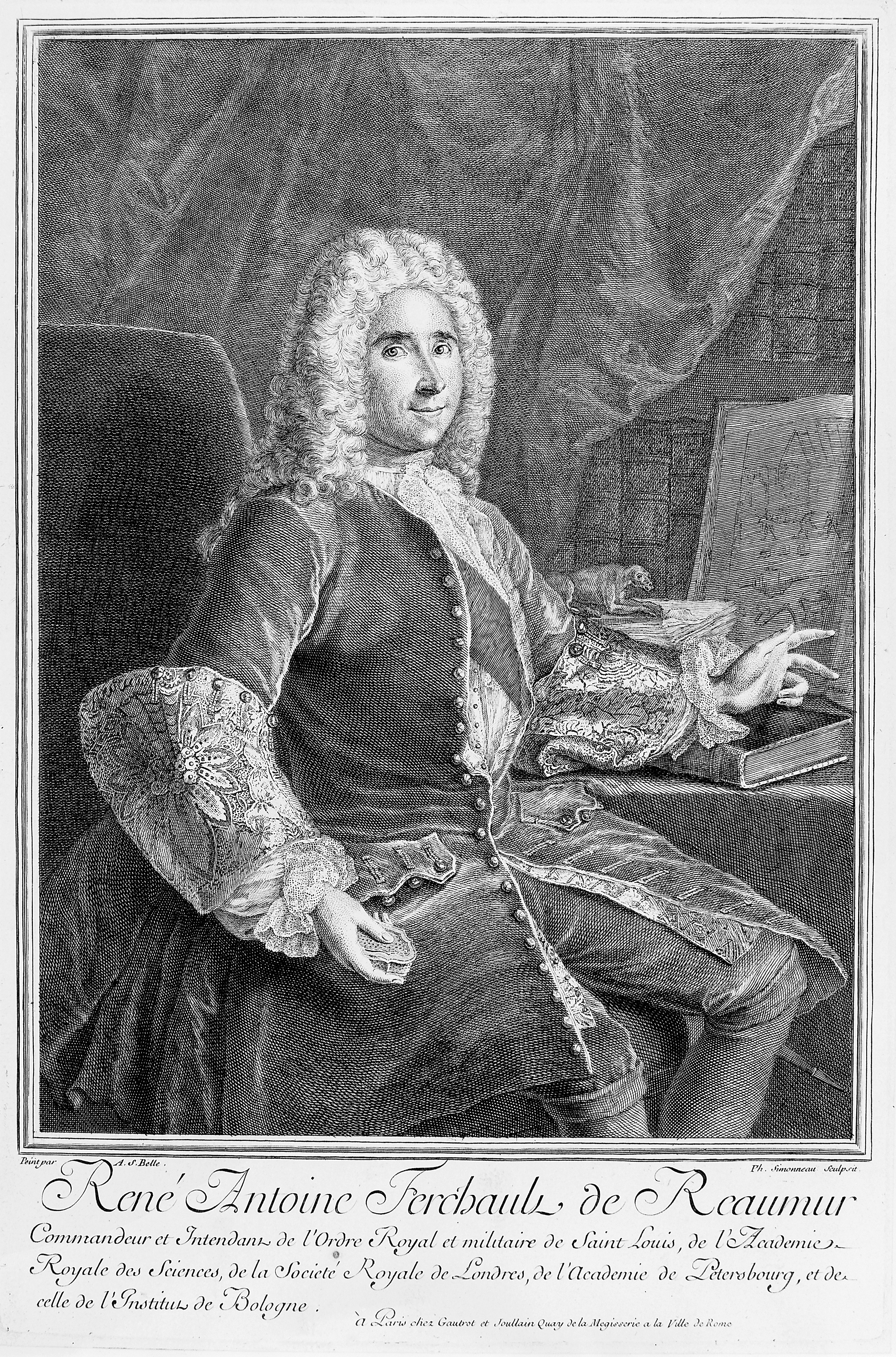
René-Antoine Ferchault de Réaumur by Simmonneau after Alexis Simon Belle

Réaumur's scientific papers deal with many branches of science. His first, in 1708, was on a general problem in geometry. His last, in 1756, on the forms of birds' nests. He proved experimentally the fact that the strength of a rope is more than the sum of the strengths of its separate strands. He examined and reported on the auriferous (gold-bearing) rivers, the turquoise mines, the forests and the fossil beds of France. He devised the method of tinning iron that is still employed, and investigated the differences between iron and steel, correctly showing that the amount of carbon is greatest in cast iron, less in steel, and least in wrought iron. His book on this subject (1722) was translated into English and German.

He was noted for a thermometer he constructed on the principle of taking the freezing point of water as 0°, and graduating the tube into degrees each of which was one-thousandth of the volume contained by the bulb and tube up to the zero mark. It was an accident dependent on the particular alcohol employed which made the boiling-point of water 108°; mercurial thermometers graduated into 80 equal parts between the freezing- and boiling-points of water are named Réaumur thermometers but diverge from his design and intention.

Réaumur wrote much on natural history. Early in life he described the locomotor system of the Echinodermata, and showed that the supposed ability of replacing their lost limbs was actually true. He has been considered as a founder of ethology.

In 1710 he wrote a paper on the possibility of spiders being used to produce silk, which was so celebrated at the time that the Kangxi Emperor of China had it translated into Chinese. His observations of wasps making paper from wood fibres have led some to credit him with this change in paper-making techniques. It was over a century before wood pulp was used on any industrial scale in paper making.

He studied the relationship between the growth of insects and temperature. He also computed the rate of growth of insect populations and noted that there must be natural checks since the theoretical population numbers achievable by geometric progression were not matched by observations of actual populations.

He also studied botanical and agricultural matters, and devised processes for preserving birds and eggs. He elaborated a system of artificial incubation, and made important observations on the digestion of carnivorous and graminivorous (grass-eating) birds. One of his greatest works is the Mémoires pour servir à l'histoire des insectes, 6 vols., with 267 plates (Amsterdam, 1734–1742). It describes the appearance, habits and locality of all the known insects except the beetles, and is a marvel of patient and accurate observation. Among other important facts stated in this work are the experiments which enabled Réaumur to prove the correctness of Peyssonel's hypothesis, that corals are animals and not plants.

He was elected a fellow of the Royal Society in November 1738 by virtue of the fact that:

His Name hath been known for many years among the Learned by Several Curious disertations published in the Memoirs of the Royal Academy of Sciences at Paris & in particular by a very Learned and usefull book wrote in French entitled 'The Art of Converting Forged Iron into Steel' and 'the Art of Soft'ning Cast Iron' printed at Paris 1722 4to and lately by his 'Curious Memoires relating to the History of Insects' at Paris in 4to three Volumes of which work have been Laid before the Royal Society.

He was elected a foreign member of the Royal Swedish Academy of Sciences in 1748.

He is commemorated in numerous place names including the rue Réaumur and the Réaumur–Sébastopol metro station in Paris and the Place Réaumur, Le Havre.

== Selected works ==
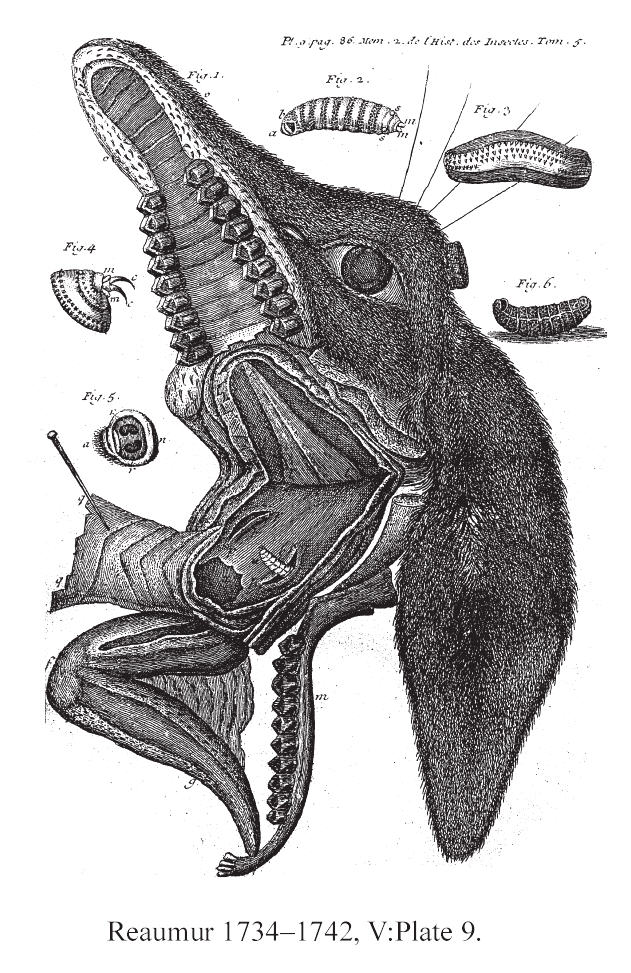
Dissected head of a deer showing botfly larvae

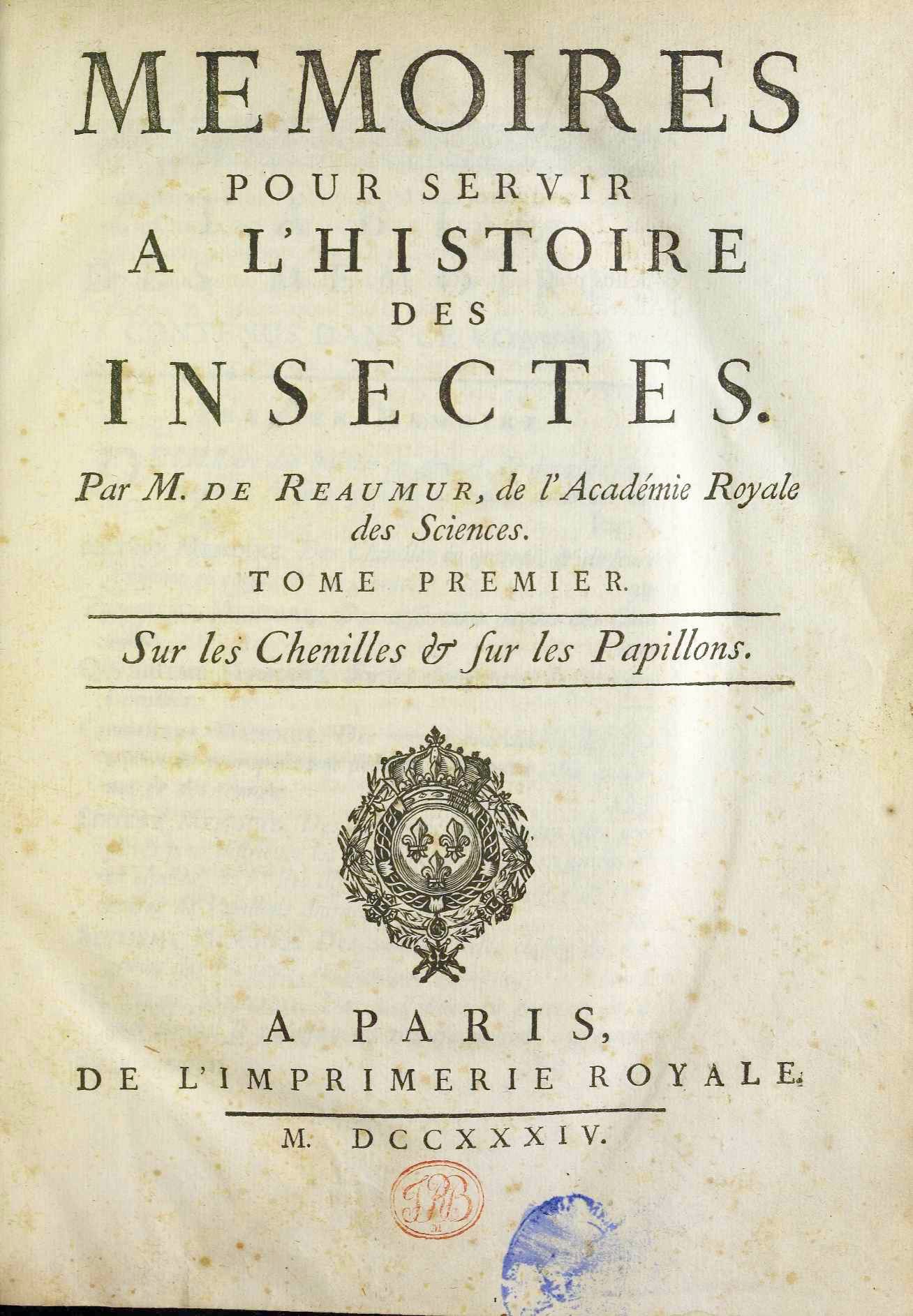
Mémoires pour servir a l'histoire des insectes, 1734

- Réaumur, R.-A. F. de. 1722. L'art de convertir le fer forgé en acier, et l'art d'adoucir le fer fondu, ou de faire des ouvrages de fer fondu aussi finis que le fer forgé. Paris, France.
- Réaumur, R.-A. F. de. 1734–1742. Mémoires pour servir à l'histoire des insectes. Six volumes. Académie Royale des Sciences, Paris, France.
- Réaumur, R.-A. F. de. 1749. Art de faire éclorre et d'élever en tout saison des oiseaux Domestiques de toutes espèces. Two volumes. Imprimerie royale, Paris, France.
- Réaumur, R.-A. F. de. 1750. The art of hatching and bringing up domestic fowls. London, UK.
- Réaumur, R.-A. F. de. 1800. Short history of bees I. The natural history of bees . . . Printed for Vernor and Hood in the Poultry, by J. Cundee, London, UK.
- Réaumur, R.-A. F. de. 1926. The natural history of ants, from an unpublished manuscript. W. M. Wheeler, editor and translator. [Includes French text.] Knopf, New York City, USA. Reprinted 1977. Arno Press, New York City, USA.
- Réaumur, R.-A. F. de. 1939. Morceaux choisis. Jean Torlais, editor. Gallimard, Paris, France.
- Réaumur, R.-A. F. de. 1955. Histoire des scarabées. M. Caullery, introduction. Volume 11 of Encyclopédie Entomologique. Paul Lechevalier, Paris, France.
- Réaumur, R.-A. F. de. 1956. Memoirs on steel and iron. A. G. Sisco, translator. C. S. Smith, introduction and notes. University of Chicago Press, Chicago, Illinois, USA.

== Publications ==
- Mémoires pour servir a l'histoire des insectes (in French). Vol. 1. Paris: Imprimerie Royale. 1734.
- Mémoires pour servir a l'histoire des insectes (in French). Vol. 2. Paris: Imprimerie Royale. 1736.
- Mémoires pour servir a l'histoire des insectes (in French). Vol. 3. Paris: Imprimerie Royale. 1737.
- Mémoires pour servir a l'histoire des insectes (in French). Vol. 4. Paris: Imprimerie Royale. 1738.
- Mémoires pour servir a l'histoire des insectes (in French). Vol. 5. Paris: Imprimerie Royale. 1740.
