= Bourse station =

Metro station in Paris, France

Bourse
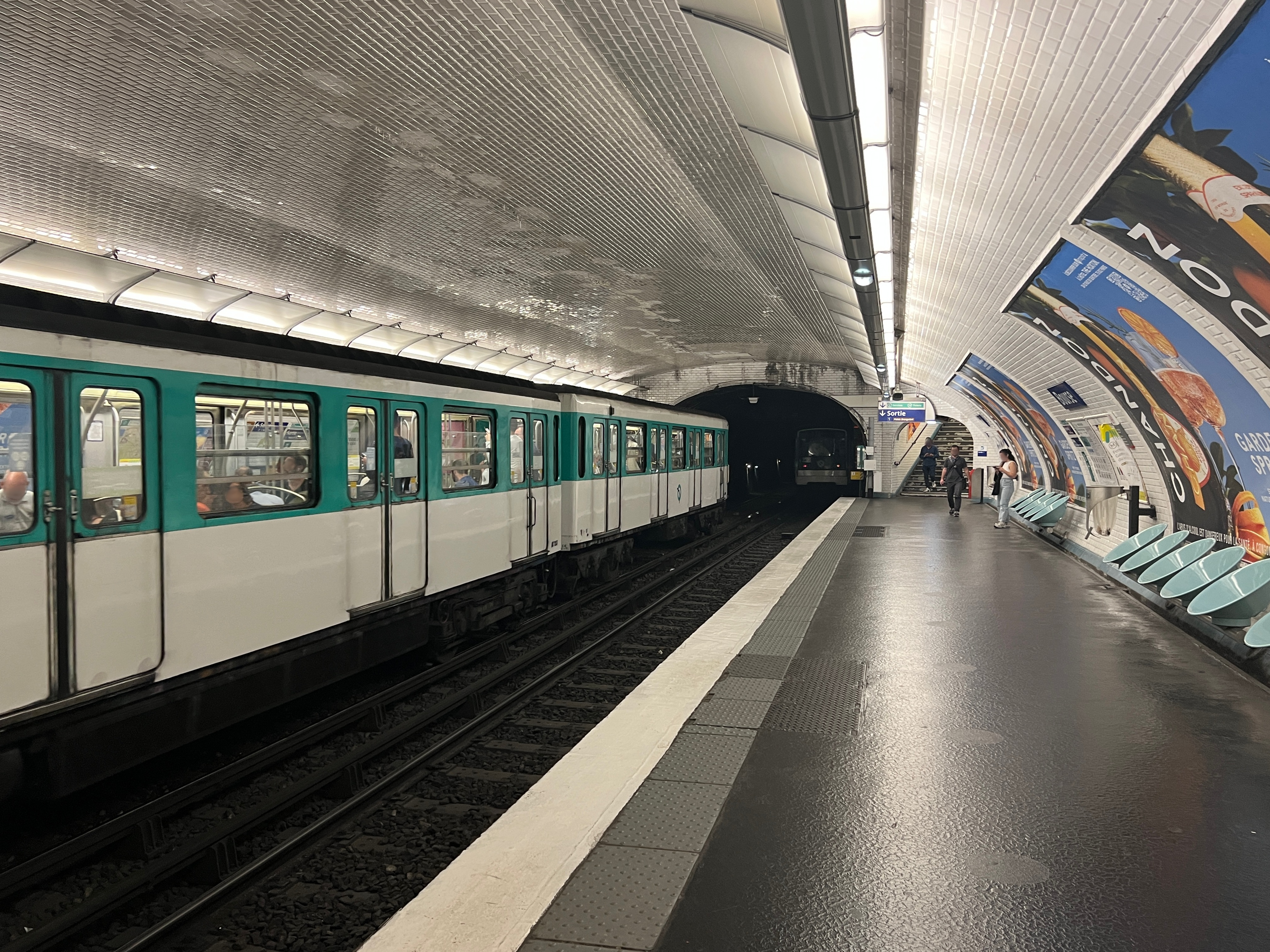

General information
- Location: 12, place de la Bourse; Rue Notre-Dame-des-Victoires at rue Réaumur; 2nd arrondissement of Paris; Île-de-France; France
- Coordinates: 48°52′07″N 2°20′29″E
- Owner: RATP
- Operator: RATP

Other information
- Fare zone: 1

History
- Opened: 19 October 1904

Services
Preceding station	Paris Metro	Following station
Quatre-Septembre towards Pont de Levallois–Bécon	Line 3	Sentier towards Gallieni
Location
- Location within Paris

Bourse (pronounced [buʁs]) is a station on Paris Métro Line 3, located in the 2nd arrondissement of Paris.

== Location ==
The station is located under the axis of the Rue Quatre-Septembre and Réaumur, right next to Place de la Bourse. Oriented approximately along an east–west axis, it is located between Quatre-Septembre and Sentier stations.

== History ==
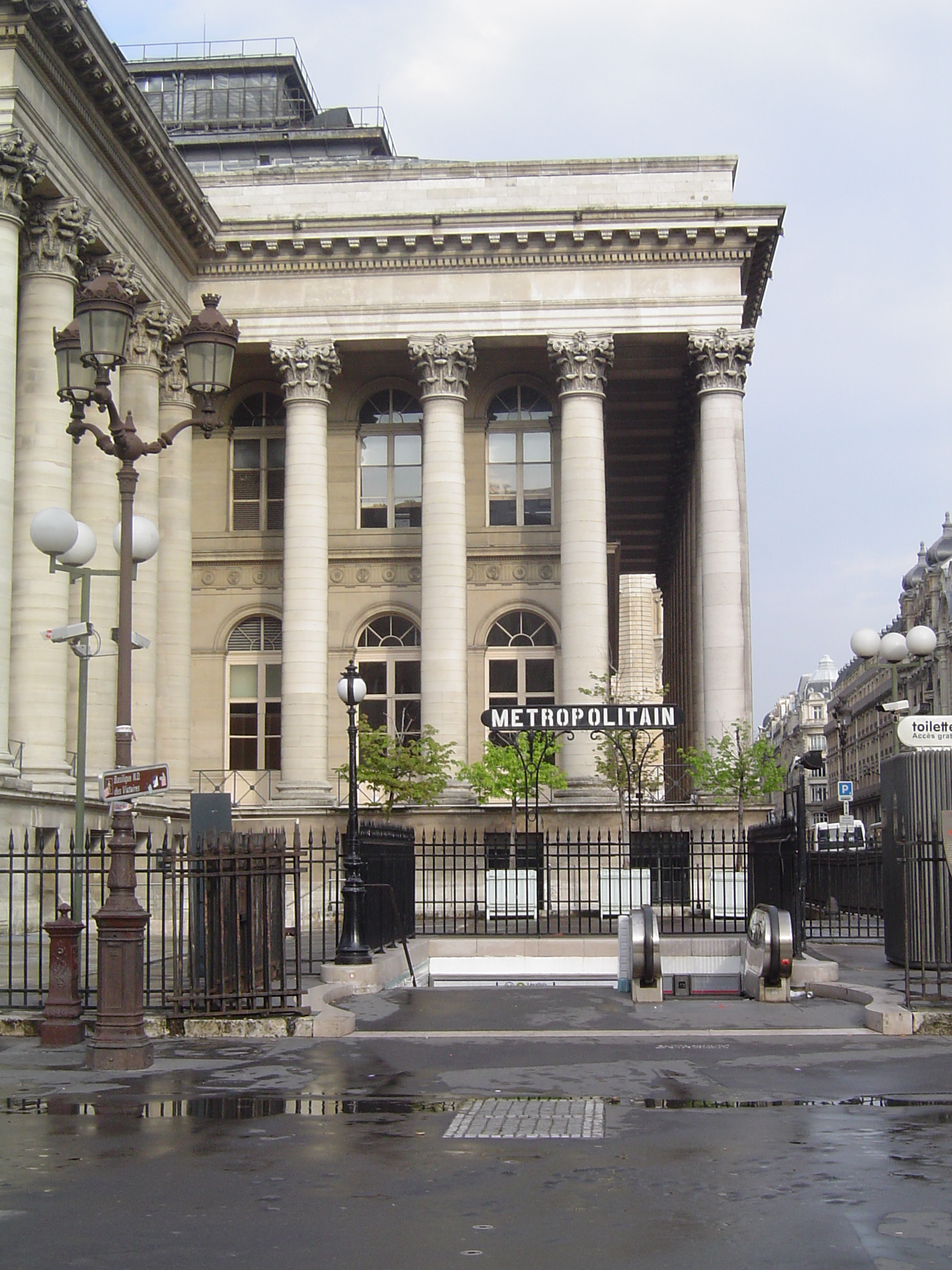
Station entrance

It opened on 19 October 1904 as part of the first section of the line opened between Père Lachaise and Villiers. It is named after the nearby Bourse de Paris (stock exchange) of which it provides a service, and at the center of which is built the Palais Brongniart, then known as the Palais de la Bourse because it housed the Paris Stock Exchange at the time. The latter sat there from 1828 to 1998 before being integrated into Euronext.

As part of the RATP's Metro Renewal program, the station's corridors were renovated on 11 July 2003, then the turn of the platforms in 2008.

In 2019, 3,386,481 travelers entered this station which places it at 148th position of metro stations for its usage.

On 9 October 2019, half of the nameplates on the platforms were temporarily replaced by the RATP in order to celebrate the 60th anniversary of Astérix and Obélix, as in eleven other stations. Taking up in particular the typography characteristic of the comics of René Goscinny and Albert Uderzo, the Bourse was humorously renamed Sesterce, from the name of the Roman currency in use during the last two centuries of the Roman Republic.

== Passenger services ==
=== Access ===
The station has two adjoining accesses to the Palais Brongniart, whose respective surroundings have the distinction of being integrated into the gates surrounding the latter:

- entrance 1 - Palais Brongniart, consisting of a fixed staircase lined with an escalator, with an atypical inscription (METROPOLITAIN) above the gates, at the southwest corner of the building;
- entrance 2 - Rue Notre-Dame-des-Victoires, with a fixed staircase established on the same street, at the southeast corner of the building.

=== Station layout ===
Street Level

B1	Mezzanine

Line 3 platforms	Side platform, doors will open on the right
Line 3 platforms	Westbound	← toward Pont de Levallois – Bécon (Quatre-Septembre)
Line 3 platforms	Eastbound	toward Gallieni (Sentier) →
Line 3 platforms	Side platform, doors will open on the right

=== Platforms ===
Bourse is a standard configuration station. It has two platforms separated by the metro tracks and the vault is elliptical. The decoration is that of the style used for most metro stations. The lighting canopies are white and rounded in the Gaudin style du renouveau du métro des années 2000 renovation, and the bevelled white ceramic tiles cover the walls, the vault, the tunnel exits, and outlets of the corridors. The advertising frames are in white ceramic and the name of the station is written in Parisine font on enamelled plates. The seats are in the Akiko style in cyan colour.

=== Bus services ===
The station is served by lines 20, 29, 39, 74 and 85 of the RATP Bus Network and, at night, by lines N15 and N16 of the Noctilien network.

== Nearby Attractions ==
- Paris Bourse
- Palais Brongniart
- Town Hall of the 2nd arrondissement
- National Library of France (Rue de Richelieu branch)
- Agence France-Presse
