= Quartier du Mail =

Coordinates: 48.865966796875°N 2.3412444591522217°E

Mail
- Quartier du Mail
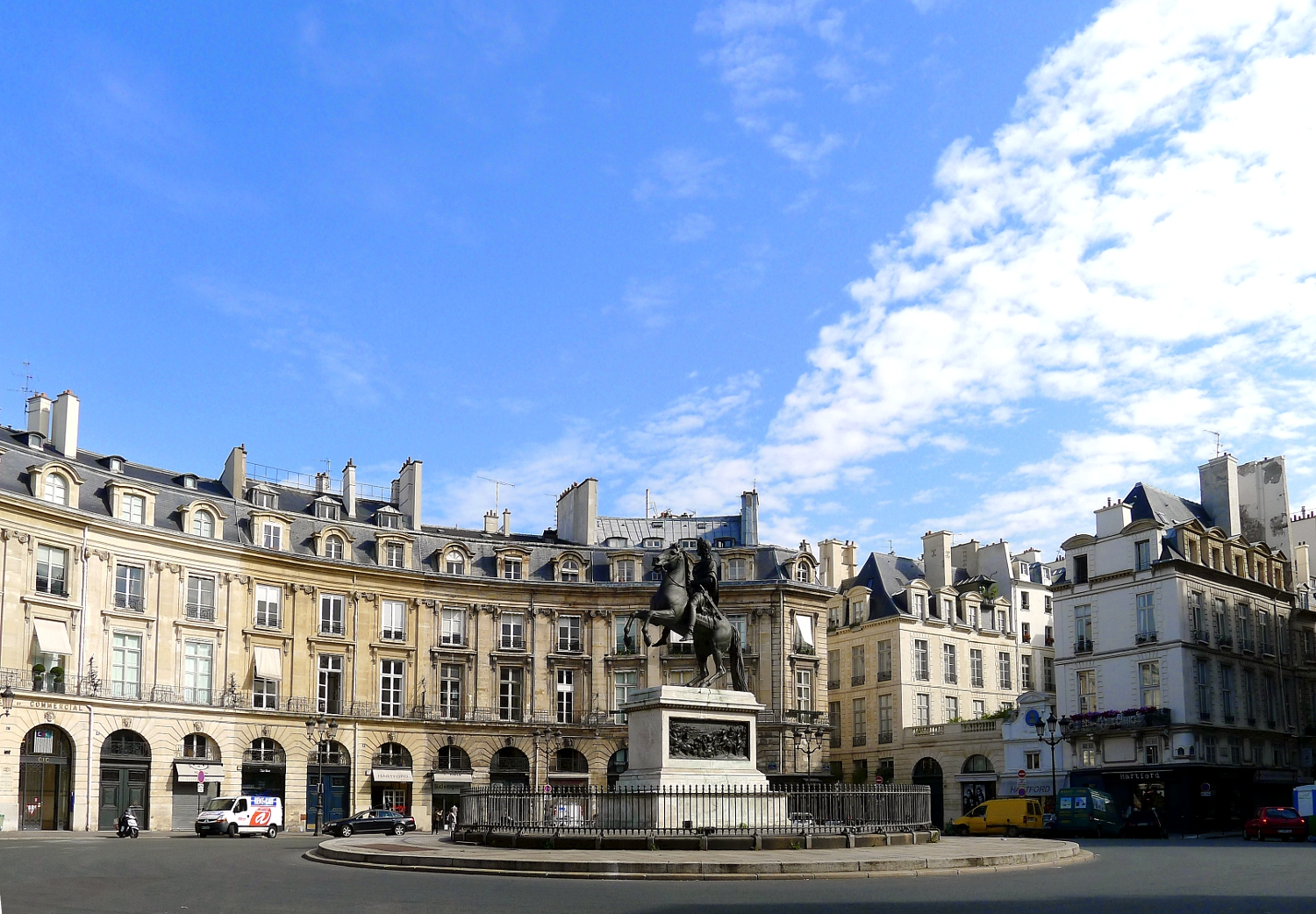
- Place des Victoires
- Interactive map of Mail
- Country: France
- Region: Île-de-France
- Ville: Paris
- Arrondissement: 2nd

Area
  - Total: 0.278 km^{2} (0.107 sq mi)

Population (2016)
  - Total: 6,382
  - Density: 22,957/km^{2} (59,460/sq mi)

The Quartier du Mail is the 7th administrative district of Paris; it is located in the 2nd arrondissement. Place des Victoires is also situated in this district.

== Boundaries ==
The quarter of the 2nd arrondissement.

The neighborhood is bounded by the following streets:

- West: starting at Place des Victoires, via Rue Vide-Gousset to Rue Notre-Dame-des-Victoires, and continuing along Rue Montmartre
- North: Boulevard Poissonnière
- East: Rue Poissonnière, Rue des Petits-Carreaux, and Rue Montorgueil
- South: Rue Etienne Marcel

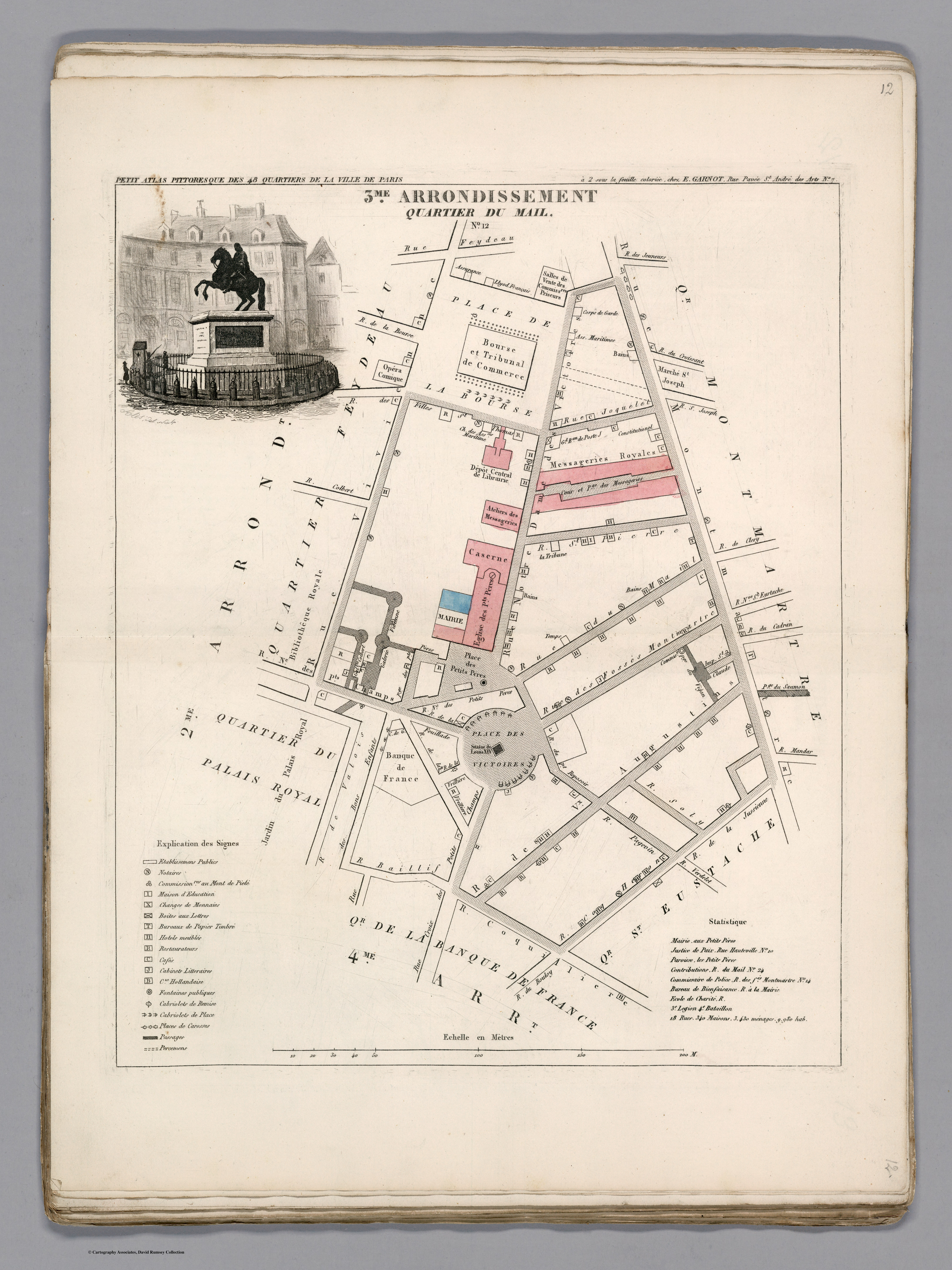
Map of the Quarter of Mail in the former 3rd arrondissement in 1834.
