= Théâtre Comte =

Theatre in Paris, France

Coordinates: 48.868390°N 2.335476°E

The Théâtre Comte (French pronunciation: [teɑtʁ kɔ̃t]), also called Théâtre des Jeunes-Élèves (pronounced [teɑtʁ de ʒœn(z‿)elɛv]; "Young Pupils Theatre"), (Note: The latter name was revived from a previous theatre, located in the rue de Thionville, that had been closed down by Napoleon's decree of June 1807.) was a Parisian entertainment venue founded by the ventriloquist and magician Louis Comte in 1820. The building was located in the passage des Panoramas of the 2nd arrondissement of Paris.

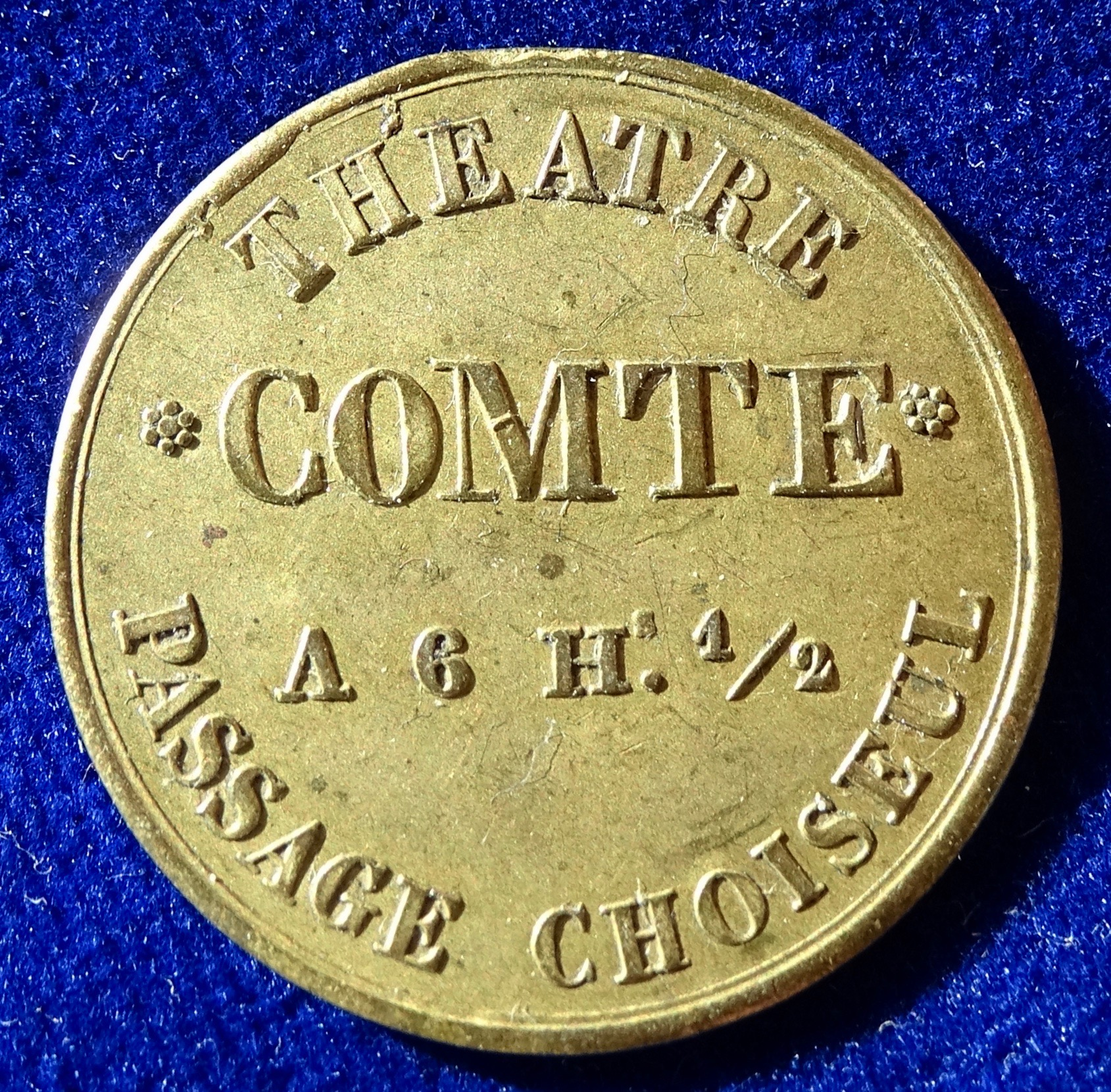
Admission token Théâtre Comte, passage Choiseul, for a family of 4, obverse.

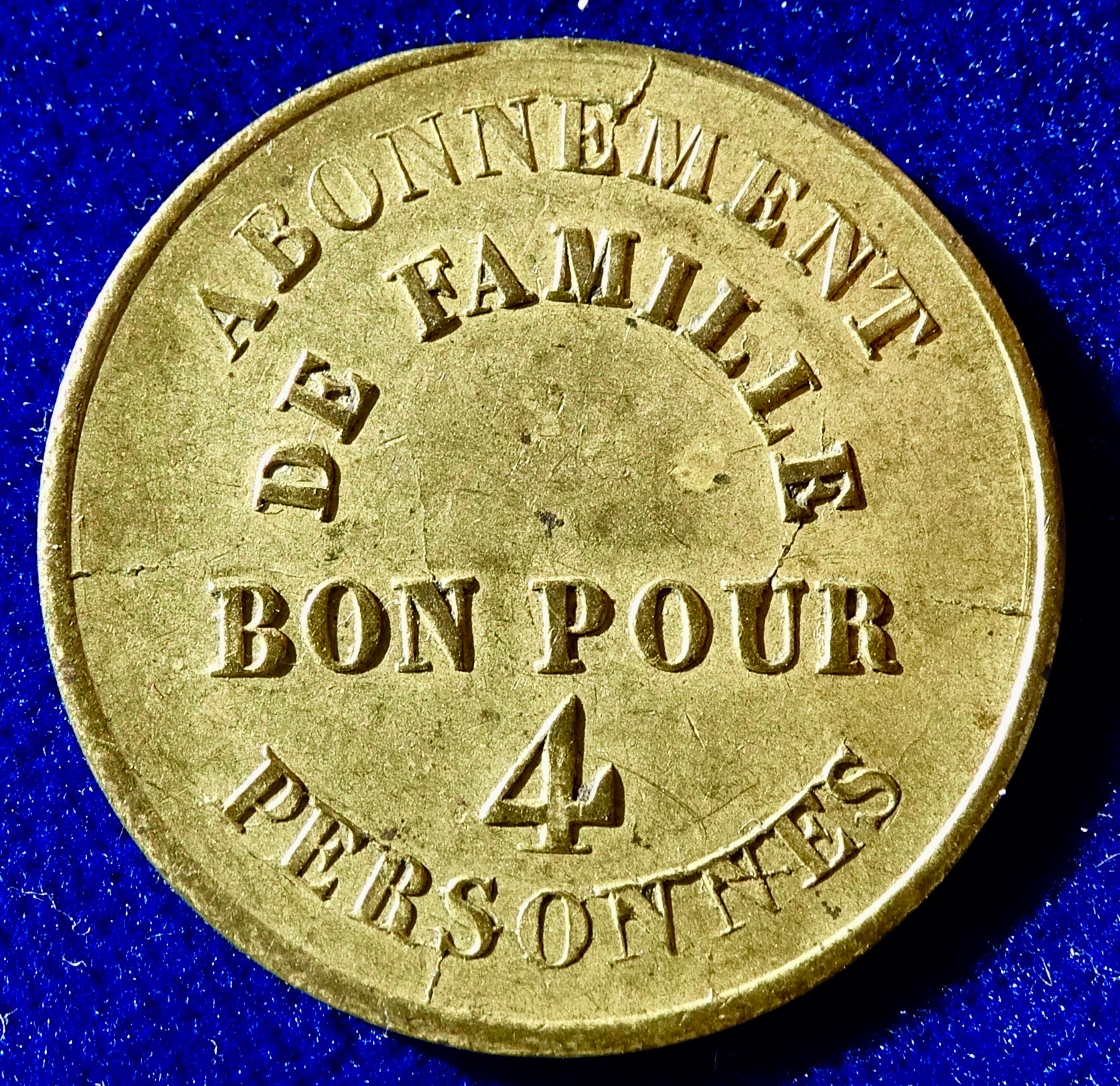
Admission token Théâtre Comte, passage Choiseul, for a family of 4, reverse.

The comedian Hyacinthe made his debut in the place in 1821. In 1826, Louis Comte had to leave the passage des Panoramas for security reasons. He then commissioned the architects Allard and Brunneton the construction of a new hall in the Choiseul area being redeveloped at that time. With double access to passage Choiseul and rue Neuve-Ventadour (current rue Monsigny), it was inaugurated on 23 January 1827.

In 1846, a law prohibiting children to play in the Theaters, Louis Comte gave up the direction to his son Charles. Jacques Offenbach took the lease in 1855 and set up his théâtre des Bouffes-Parisiens, a name which this space has retained to the present day.
