= Covered passages of Paris =

19th-century shopping arcades in Paris, France

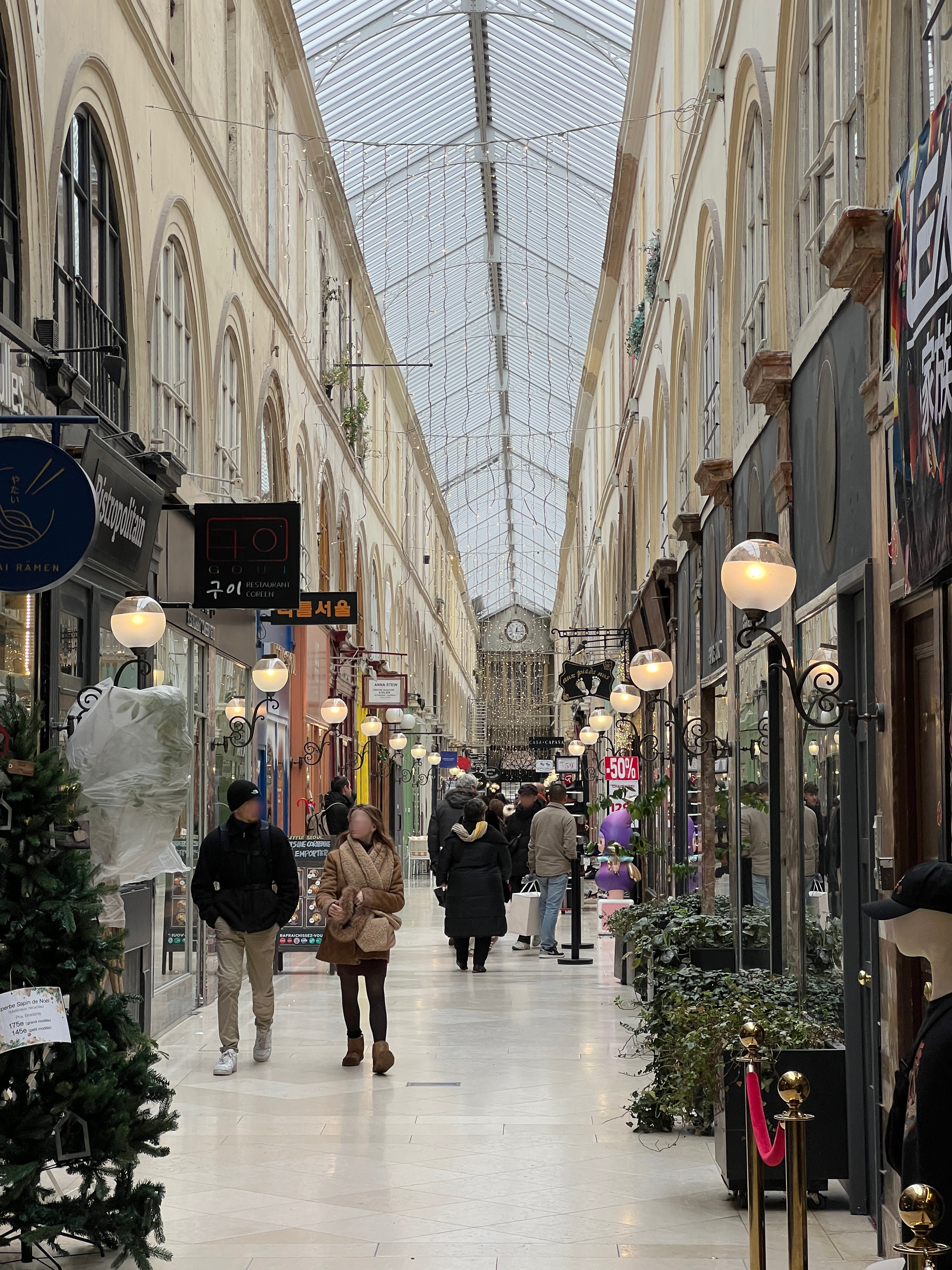
Passage Choiseul, located in the 2nd arrondissement

The covered passages of Paris (French: Passages couverts de Paris) are an early form of shopping arcade built in Paris, France, primarily during the first half of the 19th century. In recent years French author Patrice de Moncan has found historical proof of the existence of up to 50 covered passages in Paris (number that seems to have been inflated from 100 to 185 in older references) but many were demolished during Haussmann's renovation of Paris. Only 25 survived into the 21st century, all but one are in the arrondissements (municipal districts) on the Right Bank of the Seine.

The common characteristics of the covered passages is that they link at least two streets, have glass ceilings and are pedestrianised, artificially illuminated at night (initially with gas lamps), privately owned, highly ornamented and decorated, and lined with small shops on the ground floor. The passages’ upper floors usually had apartments. Originally, to keep the passages clean, each would have at the entrance an artiste de décrottage (a ‘shoe cleaning artist’).

The passages have served as centers of social interaction: Alfred de Musset frequented the Galerie Vérot-Dodat when visiting a famous actress. Eugène-Francois Vidocq, the father of criminology and of the French police system, lived in the Galerie Vivienne in 1840. As a child, Louis-Ferdinand Céline lived in the Passage Choiseul. The passages were the subject of Walter Benjamin's incomplete magnum-opus Das Passagen-Werk (Arcades Project) which was posthumously published.

They should be distinguished from other Parisian roads also called passages but whose route runs in the open air.

== List of currently accessible passages ==
The following table lists the covered passages that still exist and remain accessible to the public.

District	Name	Date	Entrance	Hours	Heritage listing	Length	Image
1	Passage des Deux-Pavillons	1820	6 rue de Beaujolais; 5 rue des Petits-Champs		Mérimée	33m	
1	Galerie Véro-Dodat	1826	19 rue Jean-Jacques-Rousseau; 2 rue du Bouloi	Monday-Saturday (except public holidays) 0700-2200	Mérimée	80m	Galerie Véro-Dodat
2	Passage Ben-Aïad	1826	9-11 rue Léopold-Bellan; 8 rue Bachaumont	Closed to the public	Mérimée	90m	
2	Passage du Bourg-l'Abbé	1828	120 rue Saint-Denis; 3 rue de Palestro	Monday-Saturday 0700-1900	Mérimée	47m	Passage du Bourg-l'Abbé
2	Passage du Caire	1798	33 rue d'Alexandrie; 2 place du Caire; 237-239 rue Saint-Denis; 14, 34 et 44 rue du Caire	Monday-Friday 0700-1800		360m	Passage du Caire
2	Passage Choiseul	1829	40 rue des Petits-Champs; 23 rue Saint-Augustin; 40 rue Dalayrac; Passage Sainte-Anne		Mérimée	190m	Passage Choiseul
2	Galerie Colbert	1826	6 rue des Petits-Champs; 2 rue Vivienne		Mérimée	83m	Galerie Colbert
2	Passage du Grand-Cerf	1825	145 rue Saint-Denis; 10 rue Dussoubs	Monday-Saturday 0800 - 2000	Mérimée	117m	Passage du Grand-Cerf
2	Passage des Panoramas	1800	10 rue Saint-Marc; 11 boulevard Montmartre; 38 rue Vivienne; 151 rue Montmartre	0600-2400	Mérimée	133m	Passage des Panoramas
2	Passage du Ponceau	1826	119 boulevard de Sébastopol; 212 rue Saint-Denis	Monday-Friday 8-9		92m	Passage du Ponceau
2	Passage des Princes	1860 (originally closed in 1985 and rebult in 1995)	5 boulevard des Italiens; 97-99 rue de Richelieu	Monday-Saturday 0800 - 2000	Mérimée	80m	Passage des Princes
2	Passage Sainte-Anne	1829	59-61 rue Sainte-Anne; Passage Choiseul		Mérimée	47m	Passage Sainte-Ann
2	Galerie Vivienne	1823	4 rue des Petits-Champs; 6 rue Vivienne; 5 rue de la Banque	0800 - 2000	Mérimée	176m	Galerie Vivienne
3	Passage Molière	1791	82 rue Quincampoix; 157, 159, 161 rue Saint-Martin		Mérimée	46m	Passage Molière
3	Passage Vendôme	1827	16 rue Béranger; 3 place de la République	Monday-Friday 0700 - 2000; Saturday 0800 - 2000	Mérimée	57m	Passage Vendôme
6	Cour du Commerce-Saint-André	1776	59 rue Saint-André-des-Arts; 21 rue de l'Ancienne-Comédie; 130 boulevard Saint-Germain		Mérimée	120m	Cour du Commerce-Saint-André
8	Galerie de la Madeleine	1845	9 place de la Madeleine; 30 rue Boissy-d'Anglas	Monday-Saturday (except public holidays) 0800-1900	Mérimée	53m	Galerie de la Madeleine
8	Passage Puteaux	1839	33 rue de l'Arcade; 28 rue Pasquier	Monday-Friday 0700 - 2400		29m	Passage Puteaux
9	Passage du Havre	1845	69 rue de Caumartin; 109 rue Saint-Lazare			115m	Passage du Havre
9	Passage Jouffroy	1845	10-12 boulevard Montmartre; 9 rue de la Grange-Batelière	0700 - 2100	Mérimée	140m	Passage Jouffroy
9	Passage Verdeau	1847	6 rue de la Grange-Batelière; 31 bis rue du Faubourg-Montmartre	Monday-Friday 0700 - 2100; Saturday-Sunday 0700 - 2000	Mérimée	75m	Passage Verdeau
10	Passage Brady	1828	43 rue du Faubourg-Saint-Martin; 22 boulevard de Strasbourg; 33 boulevard de Strasbourg (covered section); 46 rue du Faubourg-Saint-Denis		Mérimée	216m	Passage Brady
10	Passage du Prado	1830	16 Boulevard Saint-Denis; 16 rue du Faubourg-Saint-Denis	0900 - 1900		120m	Passage du Prado
