= 2018 Paris knife attack =

Terrorist attack

- 2018 Paris knife attack (Paris)
- Location: 48.8683°N 2.335956°E; Paris, France
- Date: 12 May 2018; 8:47 p.m. CET
- Target: Pedestrians
- Attack type: Mass stabbing
- Weapon: Knives
- Deaths: 2 (including the perpetrator)
- Injuries: 4
- Perpetrator: Khamzat Azimov
- Motive: Islamic extremism

The attack took place on Rue Saint-Augustin and the attacker was shot in the adjoining Rue Monsigny

On 12 May 2018, a 20-year-old Chechnya-born French citizen, armed with a knife, killed one pedestrian and injured four others near the Palais Garnier opera house in Paris, France, before being fatally shot by police. The stabbings were in the area of Rue Saint-Augustin and Passage Choiseul. French President Emmanuel Macron said France had "paid once again the price of blood but will not cede an inch to the enemies of freedom." The suspect, identified as Khamzat Azimov, had been on a counter-terrorism watchlist since 2016. Amaq News Agency posted a video of a hooded person pledging allegiance to Islamic State of Iraq and the Levant (ISIL) leader Abu Bakr al-Baghdadi, claimed to be the attacker. Europol classified the attack as jihadist terrorism.

== Incident ==
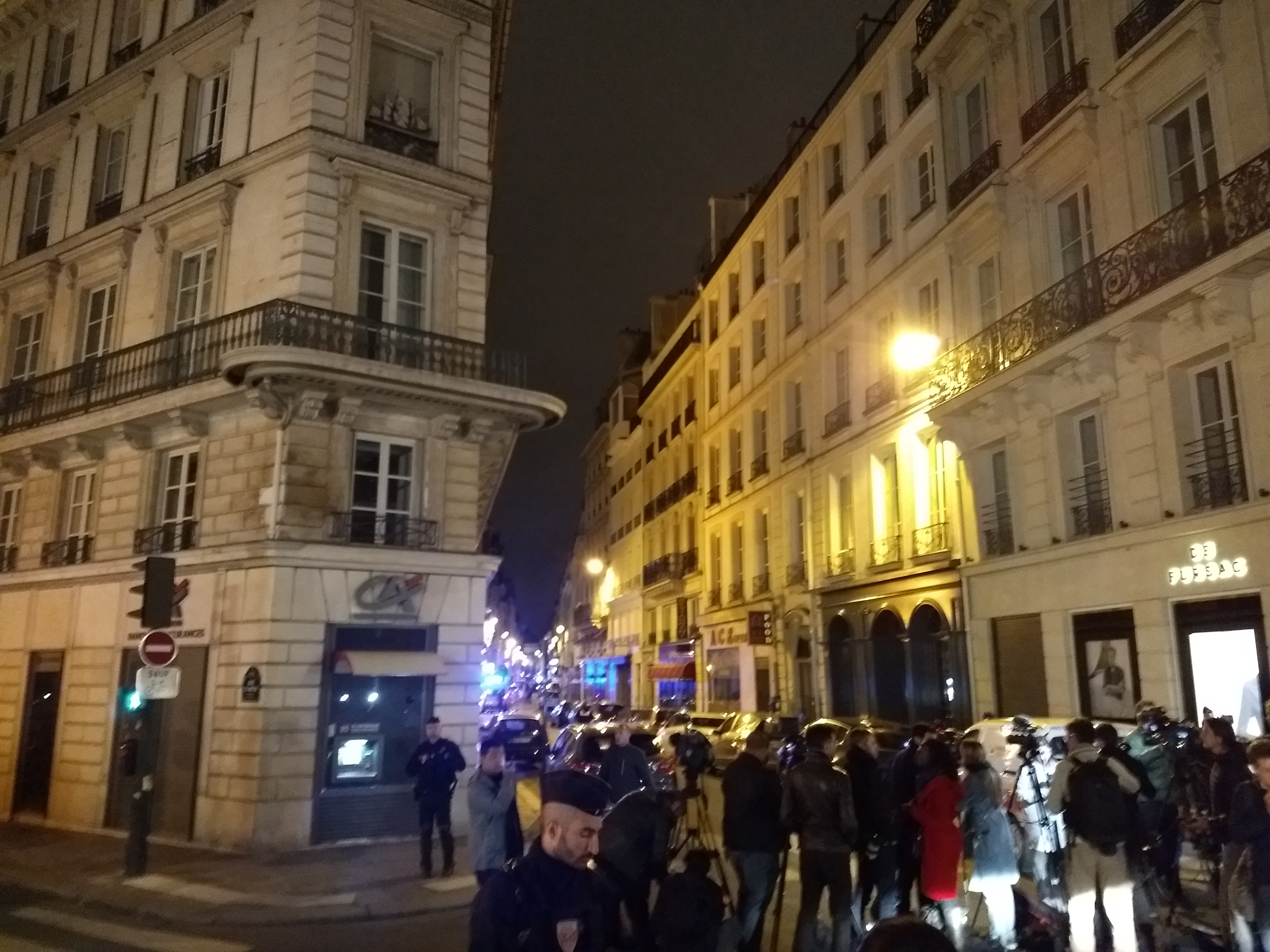
Paris police cordon off area following the attack.

The attack occurred at around 8:47 p.m., in the second arrondissement of Paris. Police first tried twice to stop the attacker with a stun-gun before shooting the suspect fatally when the stun-gun failed to incapacitate him. Footage from the scene shows people running northward from Rue Mehul into Rue Marsollier, and at least one individual on the corner of the streets potentially wounded. An unnamed witness was interviewed by France's BFM network, who stated that a young woman at the entrance of a restaurant was knifed in the neck, before being rescued, and the attacker moved to another street. The sole deceased victim of the attack was a 29-year-old man.

== Suspect ==
The attack was put under investigation of a counter-terrorism unit of the Paris Police Prefecture. The pro-ISIL Amaq News Agency claimed the suspect as a "soldier of the Islamic State", responding to its call to attack coalition citizens. Prosecutor Francois Molins stated that the attacker shouted "Allahu Akbar" during the attack.

The suspect was named as Khamzat Azimov, a French citizen and nursing student, born on 1 November 1997, in Argun, Chechnya. He came with his parents to France in the early 2000s where the family was granted refugee status in 2004. Growing up in Strasbourg, in the Region of Alsace, in 2010, his mother became a French citizen, which allowed him to be naturalized also. The then-19-year-old suspect became a person of interest for the DGSI in 2016, when some of his acquaintances planned to travel to Syria. He had no previous criminal record; however, NBC reported that the "suspect was on a police watch list for radicalism." A judicial source told French media that his parents were being held for questioning. In Chechnya, security forces deployed armored personnel carriers in Argun to round up relatives of Azimov for questioning.

A high-school friend of Azimov was arrested in Strasbourg and transferred to Paris. Shortly before the attack, he had sent his sister a text message of "a jihadist chant regularly used by the Islamic State" from one of his at least eight cellphones. The suspect, identified as Abdul Hakim A, also a Chechen-born French national who had appeared on terror watch lists, was charged with "associating with criminal terrorists with plans to attack people." Two women were detained for questioning, one reportedly Hakim A's radicalised wife who in 2017 had attempted to leave for Syria.

== Reactions ==
Paris Mayor Anne Hidalgo wrote on Twitter about the attack that "tonight, our city has been bruised" and that "all Parisians are by their side", referring to the families and friends of the victims. French President Emmanuel Macron categorized the attacker a "terrorist". French Interior Minister Gérard Collomb praised the cool and quick response of the French police who "neutralized" the assailant.

President of the Chechen Republic, Ramzan Kadyrov, blamed French authorities and his upbringing in France for the attack, declaring that "In this light, I see fit to declare that all responsibility for the fact that Azimov has embarked on the criminal path rests with the French authorities." This caused French Foreign Minister Jean-Yves Le Drian to respond by blaming it on "extrajudicial crackdowns against Chechen civilians" by Kadyrov's security forces.
