= Manche à gigot =

Tableware used for carving meat

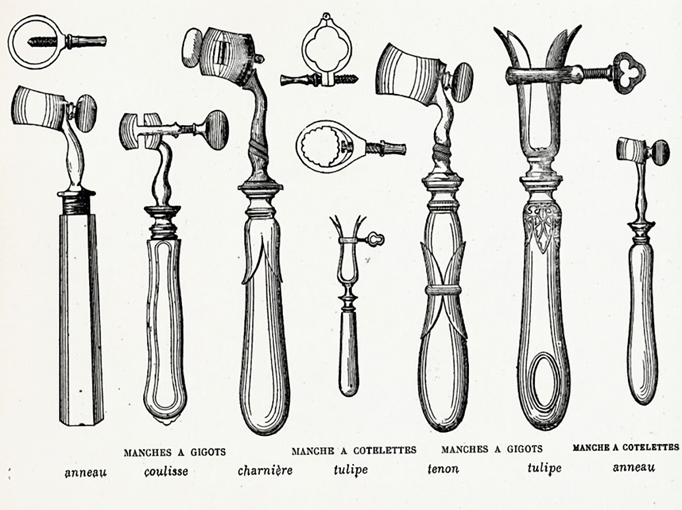
A variety of designs of manche à gigot (1890s)

The manche à gigot (French for "leg of lamb handle", also manche d'un gigot) is a specialized piece of tableware created around 1840, designed to hold the bone of a leg of lamb (or venison) while carving meat at the table.

In 1890, the gastronomy guide published in New York described the manche à gigot to be common at the French table, right after the spoons and forks, but before the salt cellar. They are still being manufactured and sold in the 21st century, targeted for niche markets.

== History and design ==
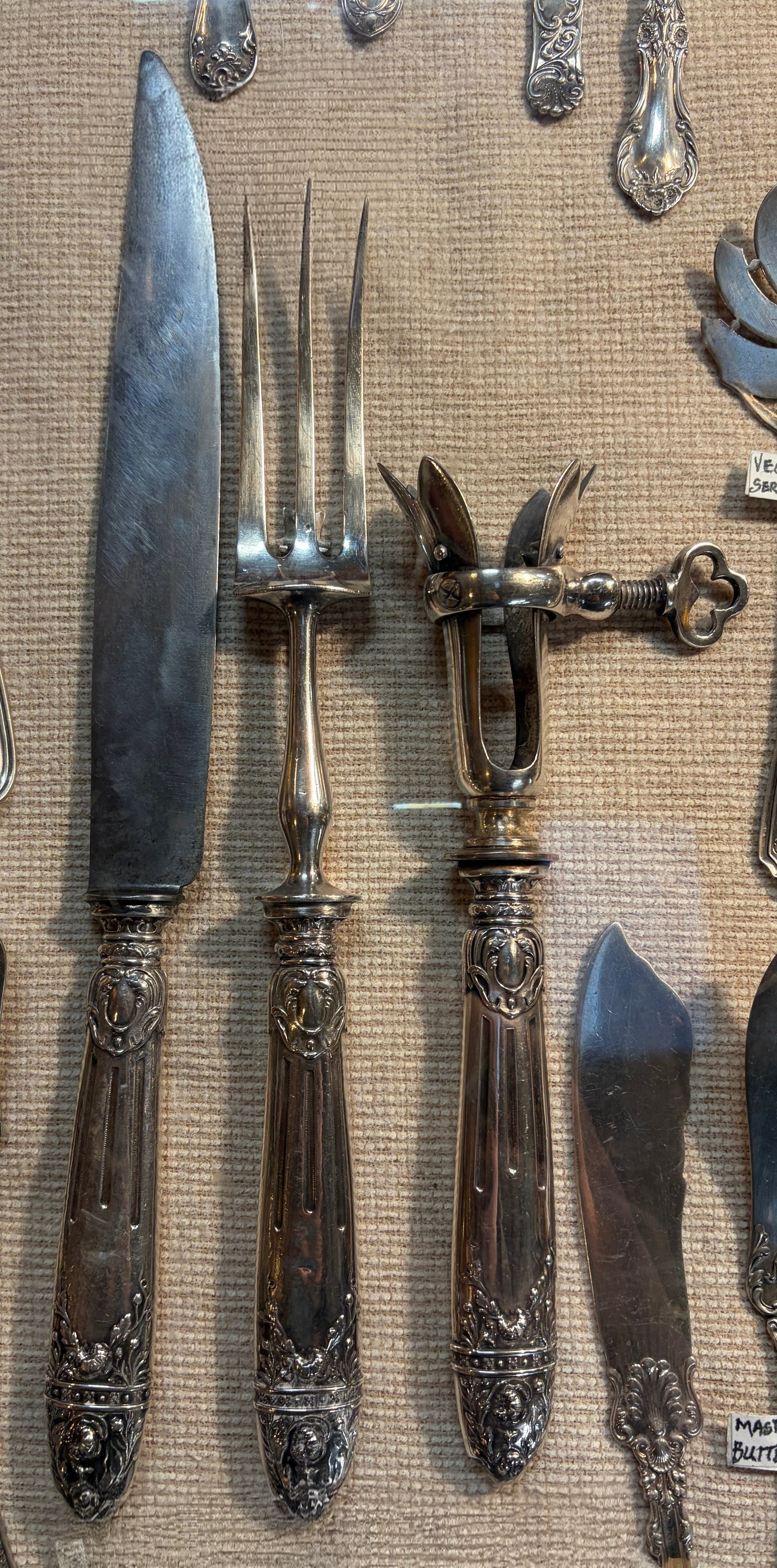
Cutlery set with manche à gigot

The original utensil, appearing c. 1840, was constructed from polished malleable cast iron. It consisted of a rod or stem ending in a ring. The bone of the leg of lamb was inserted into this ring and secured by a screw. This early primitive system had two significant drawbacks: the end of the leg bone often had to be cut because it was too large to fit through the ring, and the tightening screw frequently crushed or broke the bone, rendering the instrument useless.

In 1850, M. Evras, a cutler located at the Galerie Véro-Dodat in Paris, patented a "hinged" system (manche à gigot à charnière) on 22 October to address these issues. The ring was composed of two parts connected by a hinge, allowing the device to be attached to the narrow part of the bone without requiring the bone to be cut. An external screw tightened the ring, applying even pressure around the bone without breaking it.

The "tulip" style (manche à gigot à tulipe) was created in 1866 by Jules Piault (patent of 21 November 1866) and eventually superseded previous designs. Described as the most convenient and graceful version, it features a steel socket shaped like a tulip formed of two parts held by a ring and a screw. While this model requires the bone to be cut to fit, this practice became standard among butchers as the instrument became common on dining tables.

M. Huet of Paris simplified the manufacturing of the device by utilizing a single piece of sheet steel that was stamped into a tulip shape where the two branches acted as a spring under the pressure of the screw. This socket was then screwed onto a malleable cast iron piece forming the base and the tang for the handle.

== Variations ==
A smaller version known as the manche à côtelettes (cutlet handle) also existed. These were miniature instruments intended to hold the bone of a cutlet to prevent the diner from soiling their fingers, though they were not as widely adopted as the larger version.

== Sources ==
- Académie française. "manche". Dictionnaire de l'Académie française (in French) (online ed.).
- Child, Theodore (1890). Delicate Feasting. Harper.
- Hamlyn (2018-08-02). New Larousse Gastronomique. Octopus Books. ISBN 978-0-600-63587-1.
- Lowry, Dave (28 May 2010). "Béarnaise Basics & Manche de gigot". St. Louis Magazine.
- Olney, Richard (2011-03-15). The French Menu Cookbook: The Food and Wine of France. Clarkson Potter/Ten Speed. ISBN 978-1-60774-002-5.
- Pagé, Camille (1898). "Manche à gigot". La coutellerie depuis l'origine jusqu'à nos jours [Cutlery from the Origin to Our Days] (in French). Vol. 4. Châtellerault: H. Rivière.
