= Quartier de la Place-Vendôme =

Coordinates: 48.8674634°N 2.3294281°E

Place-Vendôme
- Quartier de la Place-Vendôme
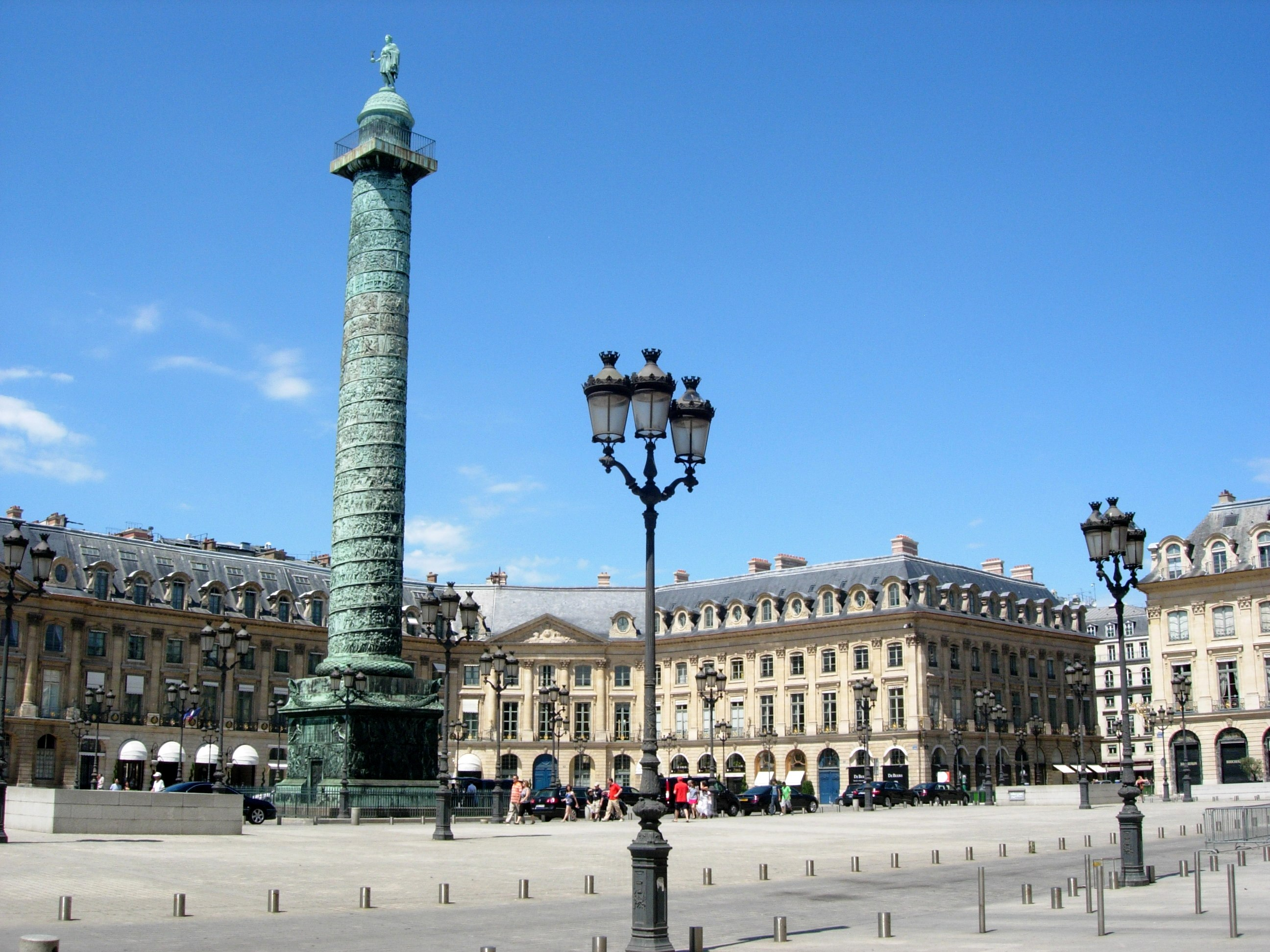
- Place Vendôme
- Interactive map of Place-Vendôme
- Country: France
- Region: Île-de-France
- Ville: Paris
- Arrondissement: 1st

Area
  - Total: 0.269 km^{2} (0.104 sq mi)

Population (2016)
  - Total: 2,743
  - Density: 10,197/km^{2} (26,410/sq mi)

The Quartier de la Place-Vendôme is one of the 80 quartiers administratifs of Paris, the fourth in the official numbering, situated in the 1st arrondissement. This district takes its name from the Place Vendôme.

Typographical rules distinguish between the following forms in writing:

- place Vendôme, for the square itself;
- Place Vendôme, a metonymic name for the Ministry of Justice;
- Place-Vendôme, the short name for this administrative district.

administrative districts of the 1st arrondissement.

== History ==
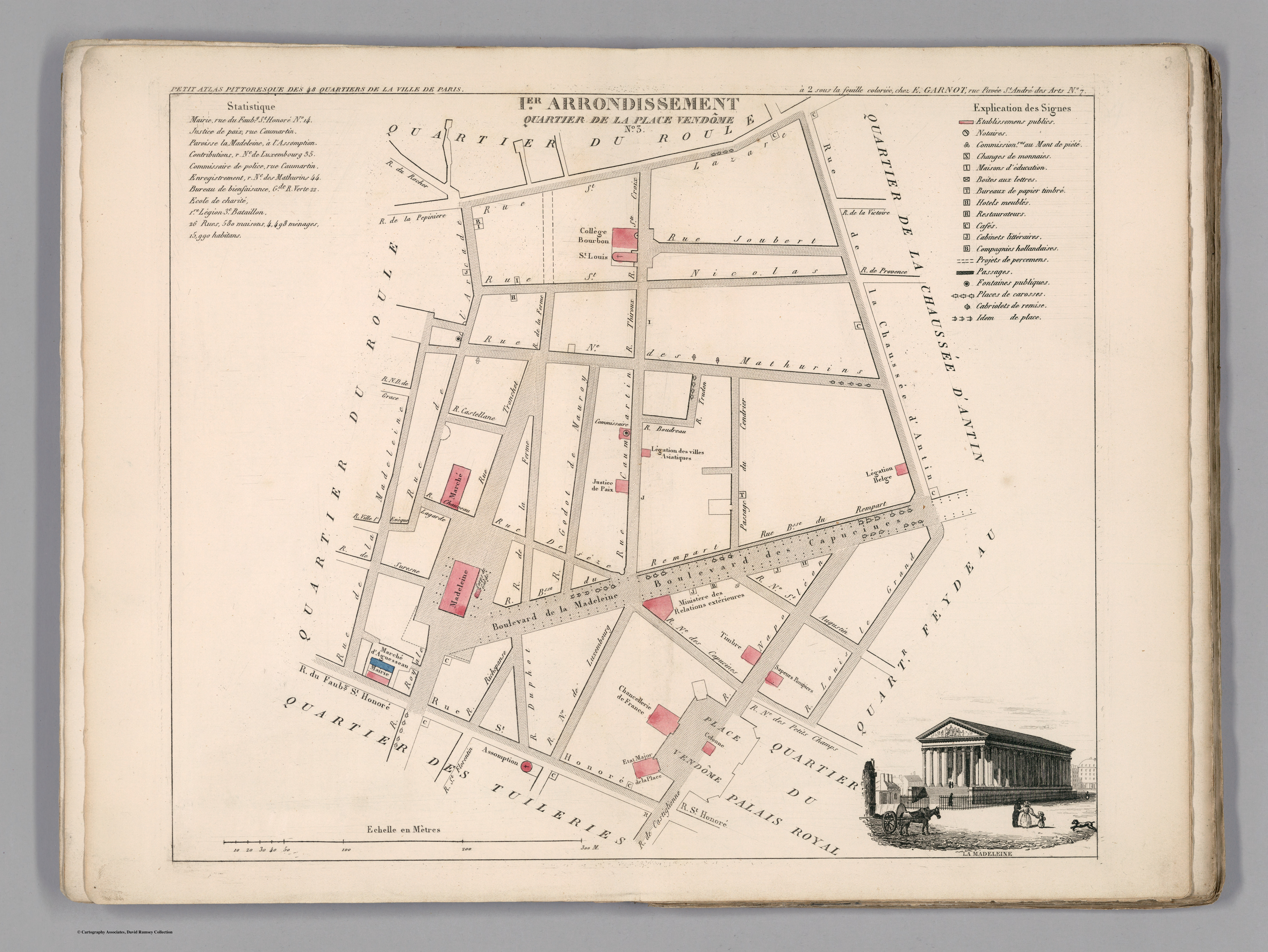
Map of the Place Vendôme neighborhood in the former 1st arrondissement in 1834.

The Place Vendôme section was established in 1790; this administrative district became the "Section des Piques" in 1792 and subsequently the "Place-Vendôme Quarter" in 1795. It was located within Paris's 1st arrondissement, with boundaries extending from Place Vendôme and following—to the left—the streets of Neuve-des-Petits-Champs, Louis-le-Grand, Chaussée-d'Antin, Saint-Lazare, Arcade, Madeleine, Faubourg-Saint-Honoré, and Saint-Honoré, returning to Place Vendôme.

A new administrative quarter was created by the Imperial decree of November 1, 1859; the attached map defined the quarter as follows: "Place Vendôme Quarter (sic). A line starting from Rue de Rivoli and following the axis of the streets of (sic) Saint-Florentin, Richepance, and Duphot; the streets of Neuve-des-Capucines, Neuve-des-Petits-Champs, Neuve-Saint-Roch, and Dauphin; and Rue de Rivoli, returning to the starting point..."

== Places of interest ==
- L’église Notre-Dame de l’Assomption
- Place du Marché-Saint-Honoré
- Ministry of Justice
- Hôtel de Gramont
- Passage des Jacobins
- Cour des Comptes
