= Union syndicale des journalistes polonais en France =

Union syndicale des journalistes polonais en France (Polish: Syndykat Dziennikarzy Polskich we Francji, 'Polish Journalists' Union in France') was an organization of Polish journalists in France. The organization was founded in 1923. The organization had its headquarters on Rue Bachaumont, in the 2nd arrondissement of Paris. As of 1934, the chairman of the organization was Alfred Bzowiecki.
