= Galerie Vivienne =

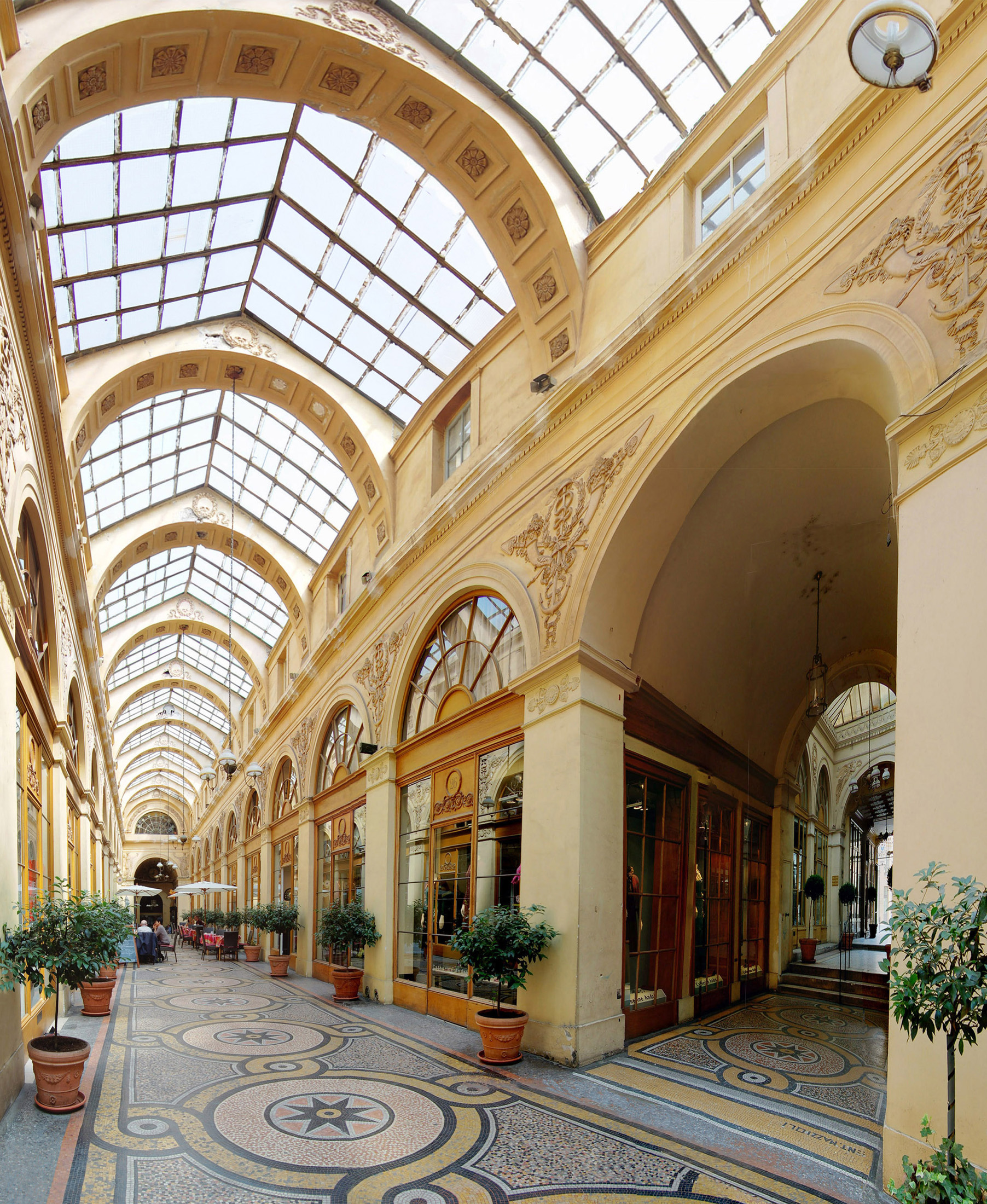
- Galerie Vivienne at intersection towards the Rue Vivienne

- Location within Paris

General information
- Type: Gallery
- Location: 6 Rue Vivienne, Paris, France
- Coordinates: 48.8667°N 2.3397°E
- Opened: 1823

The Galerie Vivienne (French pronunciation: [ɡalʁi vivjɛn]) is one of the covered passages of Paris, located in the 2nd arrondissement. It is 176 metres (577 ft) long and 3 metres (9.8 ft) wide. The gallery has been registered as a historical monument since 7 July 1974.

== History ==
The gallery was built in 1823 by Marchoux, President of the Chamber of Notaries, at the location of the Hôtel Vanel de Serrant and the Passage des Petits-Pères. It was based on plans drawn up by the architect Francois Jean Delannoy. Inaugurated in 1826 under the name Marchoux, but soon renamed Vivienne, the gallery took advantage of its unique location. It attracted many visitors with its tailor shops, cobblers, wine shop, restaurant, Jousseaume bookstore, draper, confectioner, print-seller, and so on.

Located between the Palais-Royal, the Paris Bourse (stock exchange) and the Grands Boulevards, the passage enjoyed considerable success until the end of the Second Empire. But the gallery lost some of its appeal with the move of the prestigious shops to the Madeleine and the Champs-Élysées, and particularly because of the renovation of Paris by Georges-Eugène Haussmann. The gallery has been the scene of interesting events. The monumental staircase of no. 13 led to the former home of Eugène François Vidocq after his disgrace. The convict had become chief of a police squad made up of former criminals.

There has historically been competition with the newer, nearby Galerie Colbert. Since 1960, the gallery has once again become very active. It features fashion and home furnishings, and haute couture shows held there. The installation of Jean Paul Gaultier and Yuki Torii shops in 1986 helped with the resurrection of the gallery. It now houses many shops selling ready-to-wear and decorative items.

The Galerie Vivienne and Galerie Colbert were acquired by the Bibliothèque Nationale. The latter houses the Institut National d'Histoire de l'Art.

== Description ==
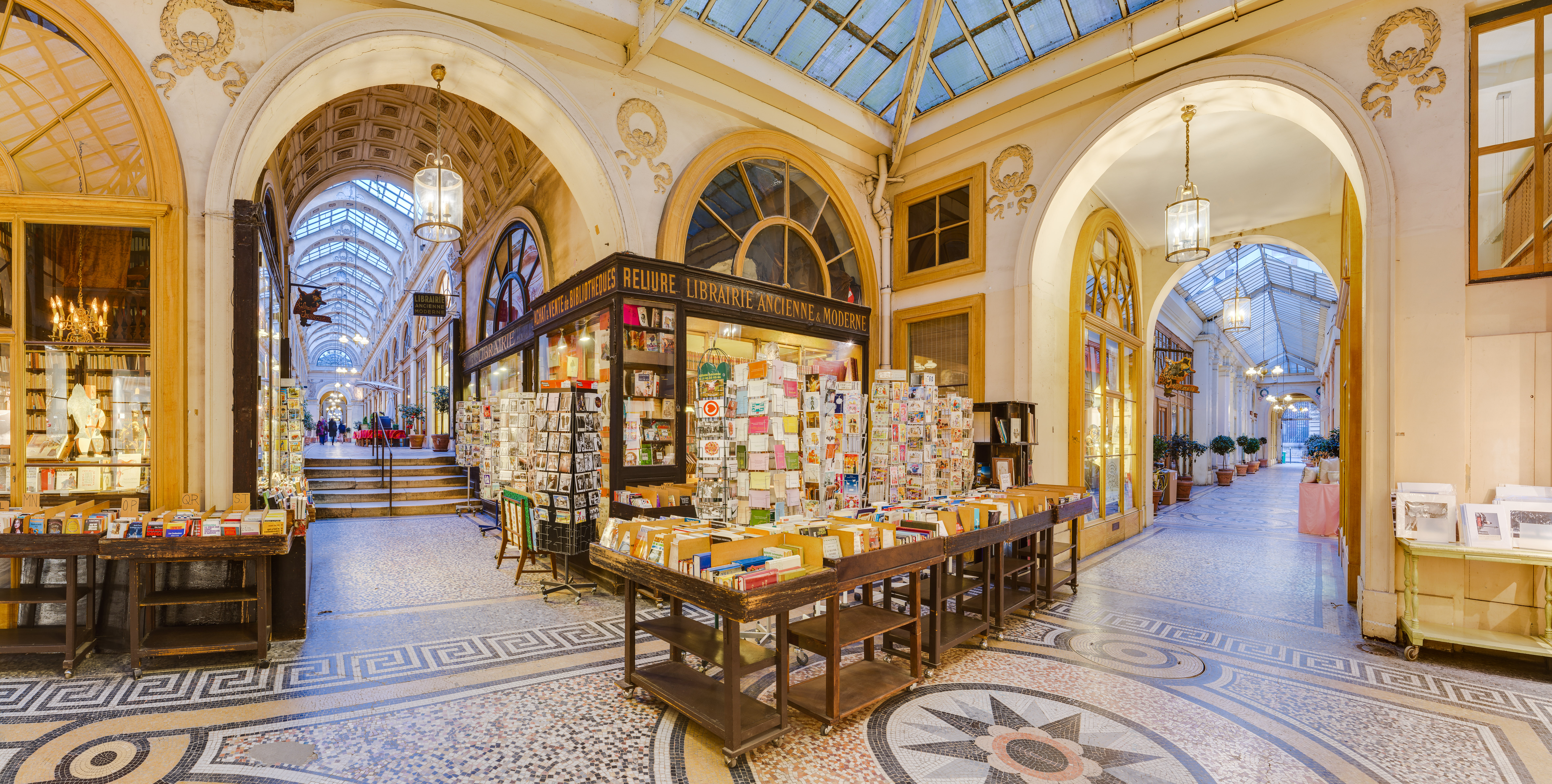
An interior view of the Galerie Vivienne

François-Jacques Delannoy conceived the decor in neo-classical Pompeian style covered with an elegant canopy, with mosaics, paintings and sculptures exalting trade. The restoration work rehabilitated the abundant ornaments around the half-moon windows, and the goddesses and nymphs that adorn the rotunda. The mosaic floors are signed Giandomenico Facchina and Mazzioli. Their sobriety emphasized by the repetition of simple geometric shapes is reminiscent of the style of the mosaics of the Rue de Rivoli. The 42 metres (138 ft) long gallery is sheltered by a glazed rotunda with a hemispherical glass dome that allows for air circulation.

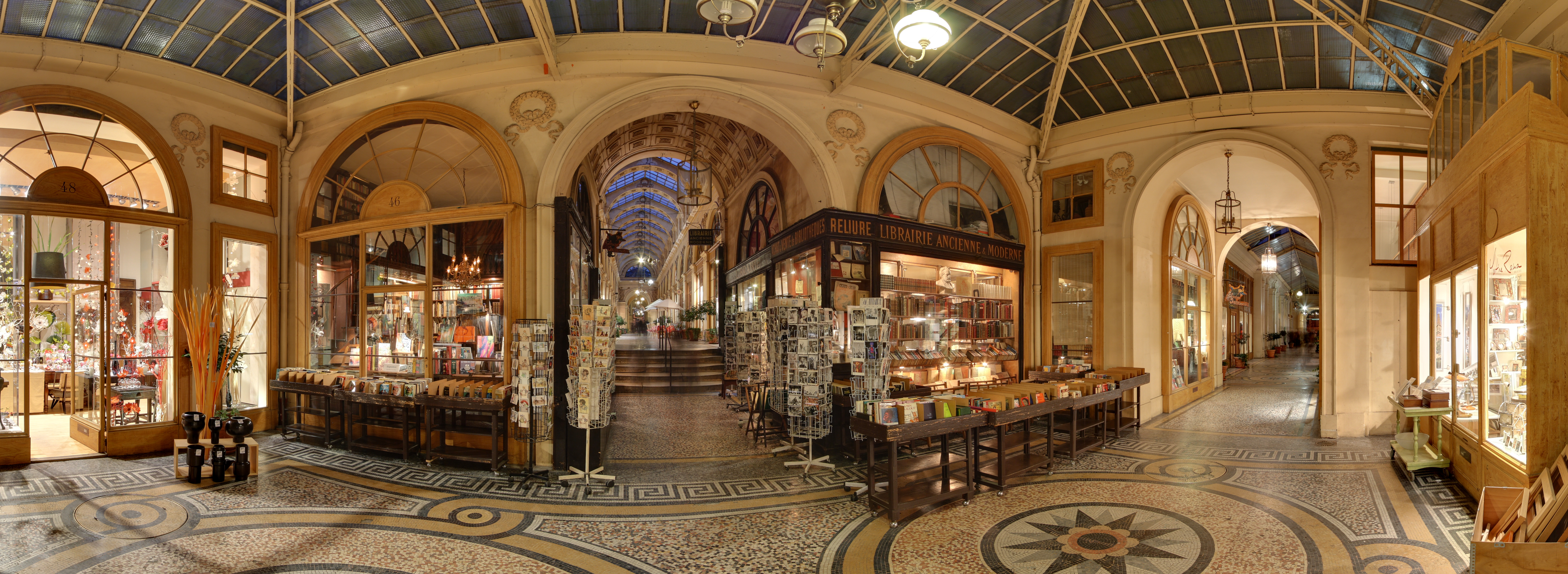
Panorama of the Galerie Vivienne

== Location ==
Located near the Metro station: Bourse.

The gallery has entrances from the Rue des Petits-Champs, Rue de la Banque and Rue Vivienne.

== Gallery ==
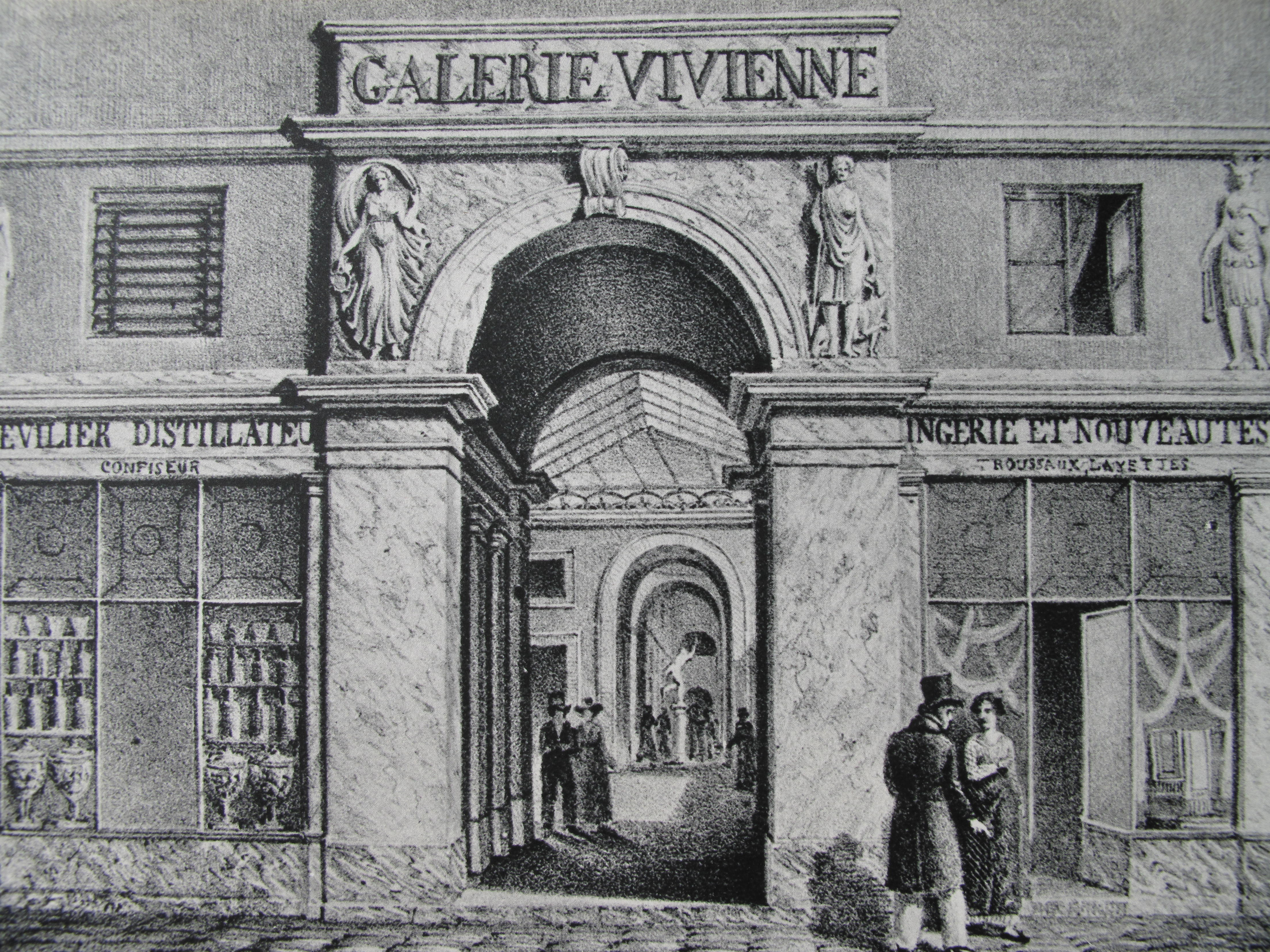
Galerie Vivienne during the Restoration

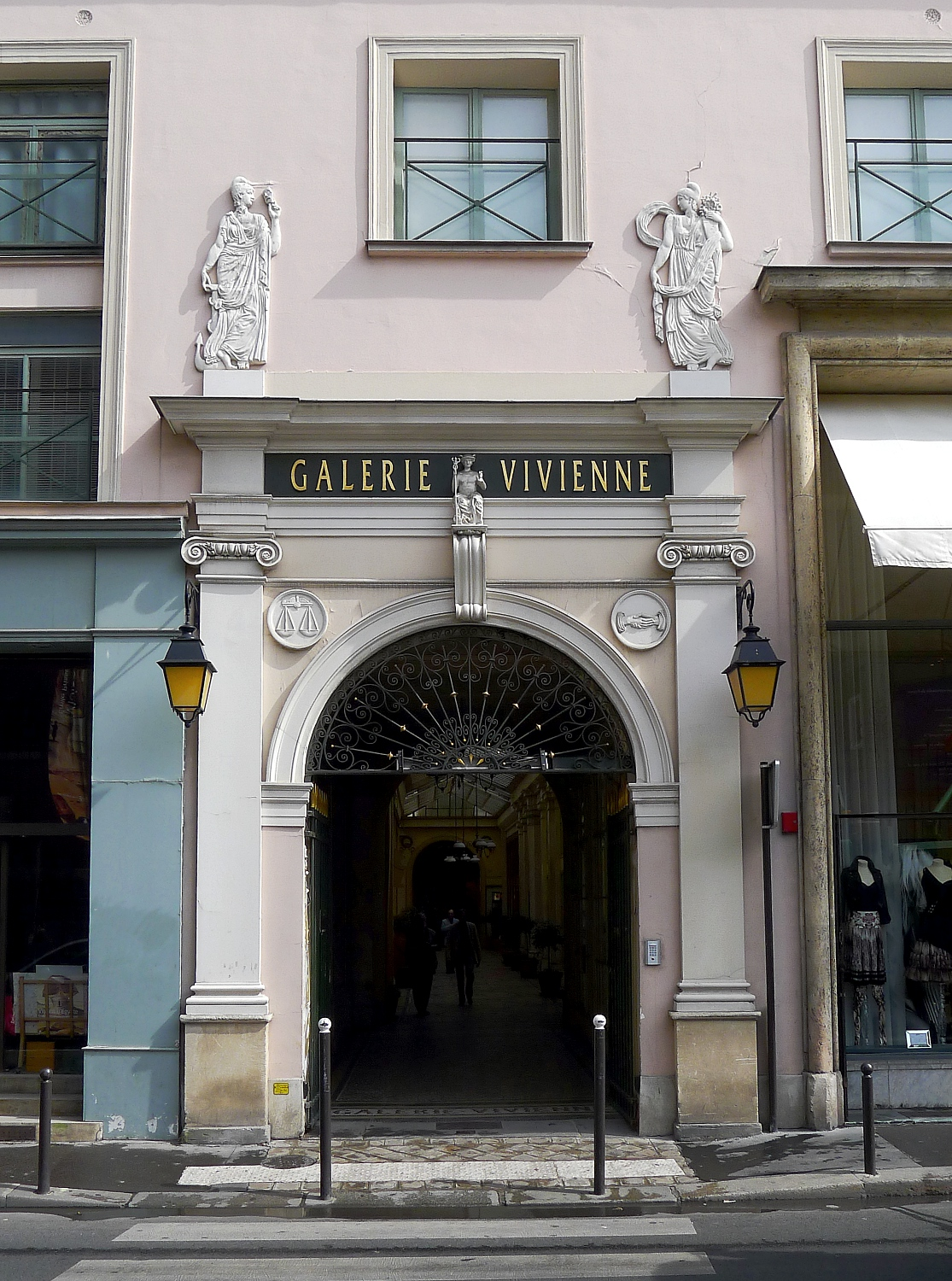
Entrance on the Rue Vivienne

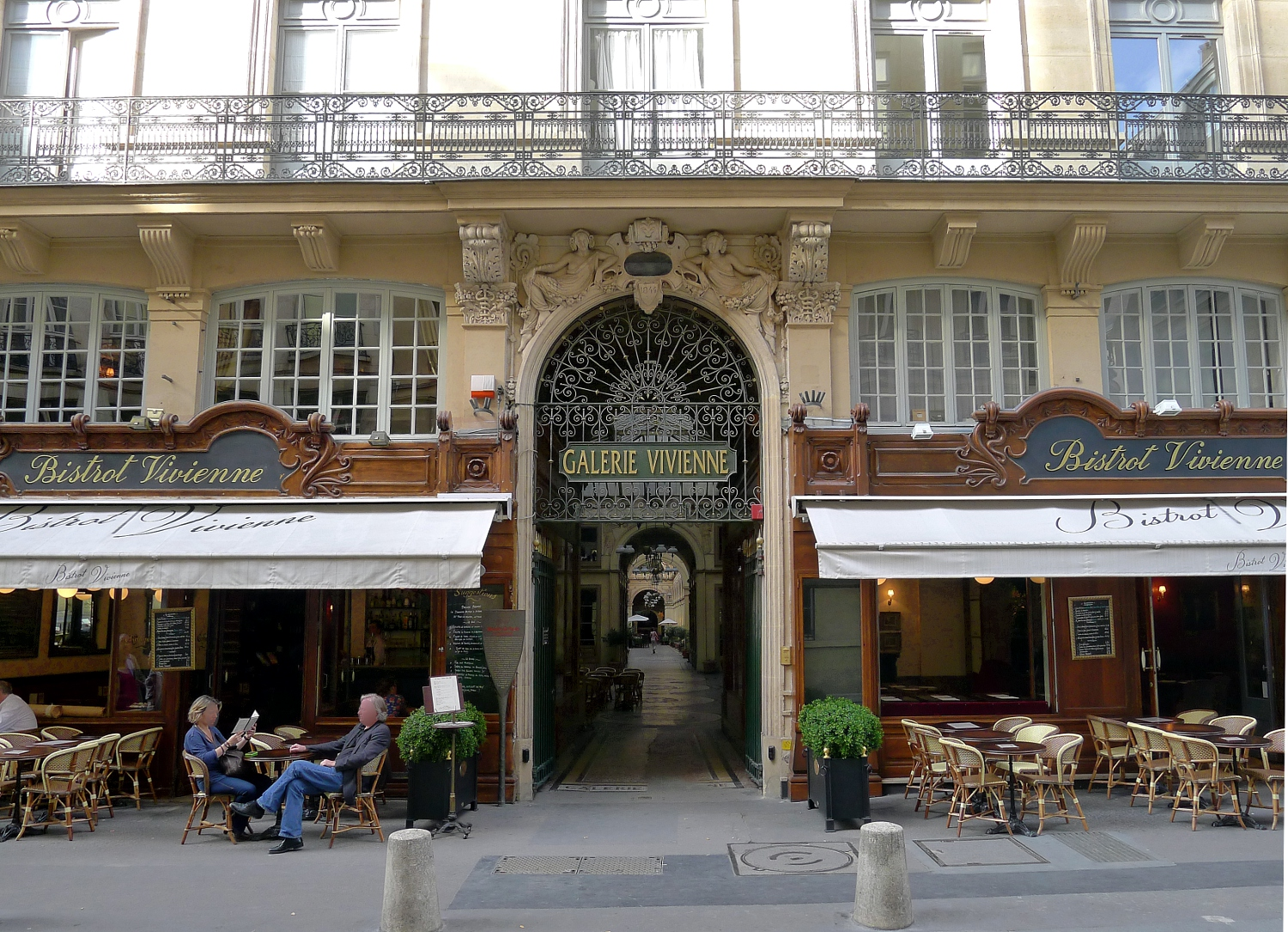
Entrance on the Rue des Petits-Champs

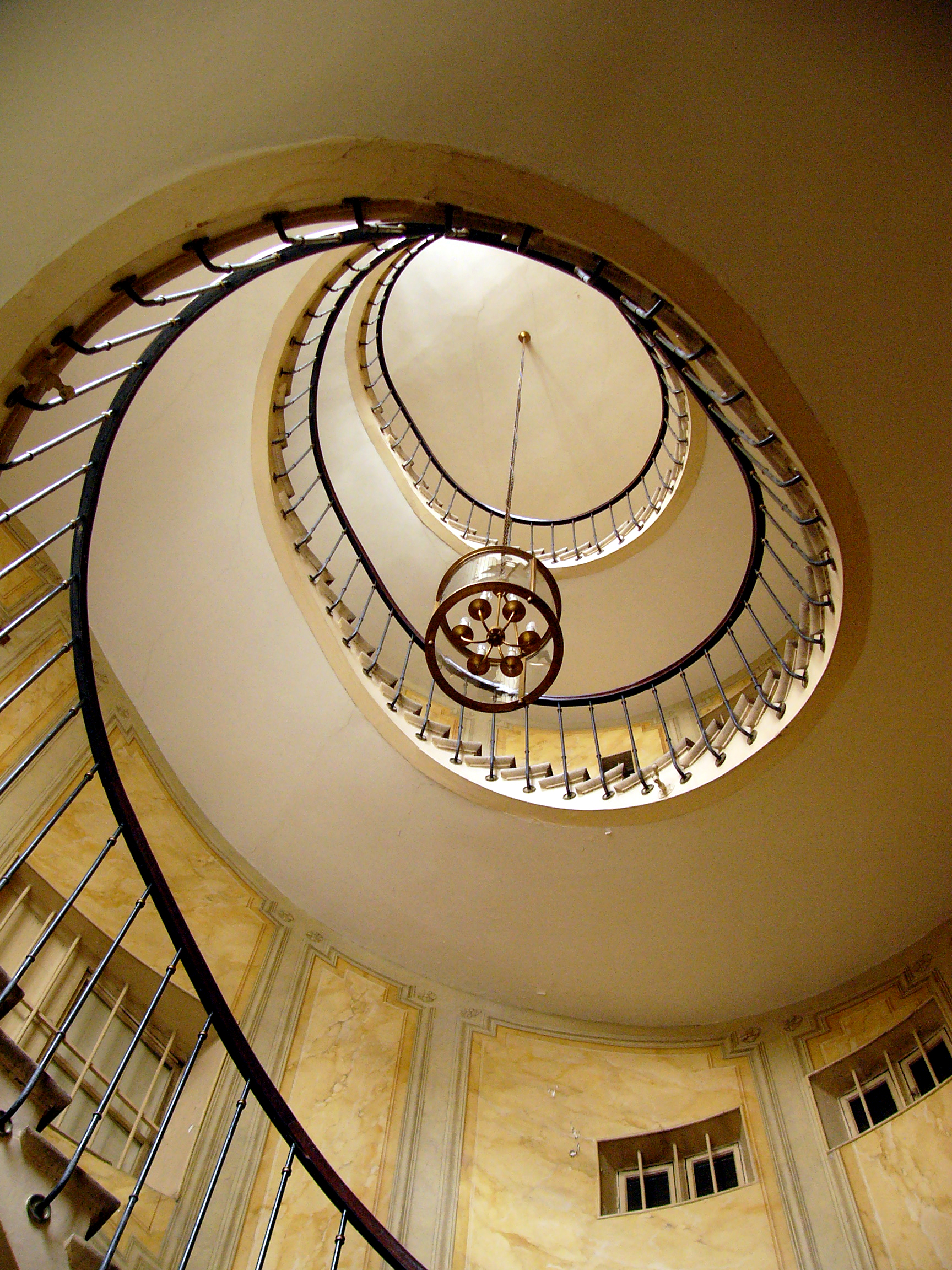
Stairway

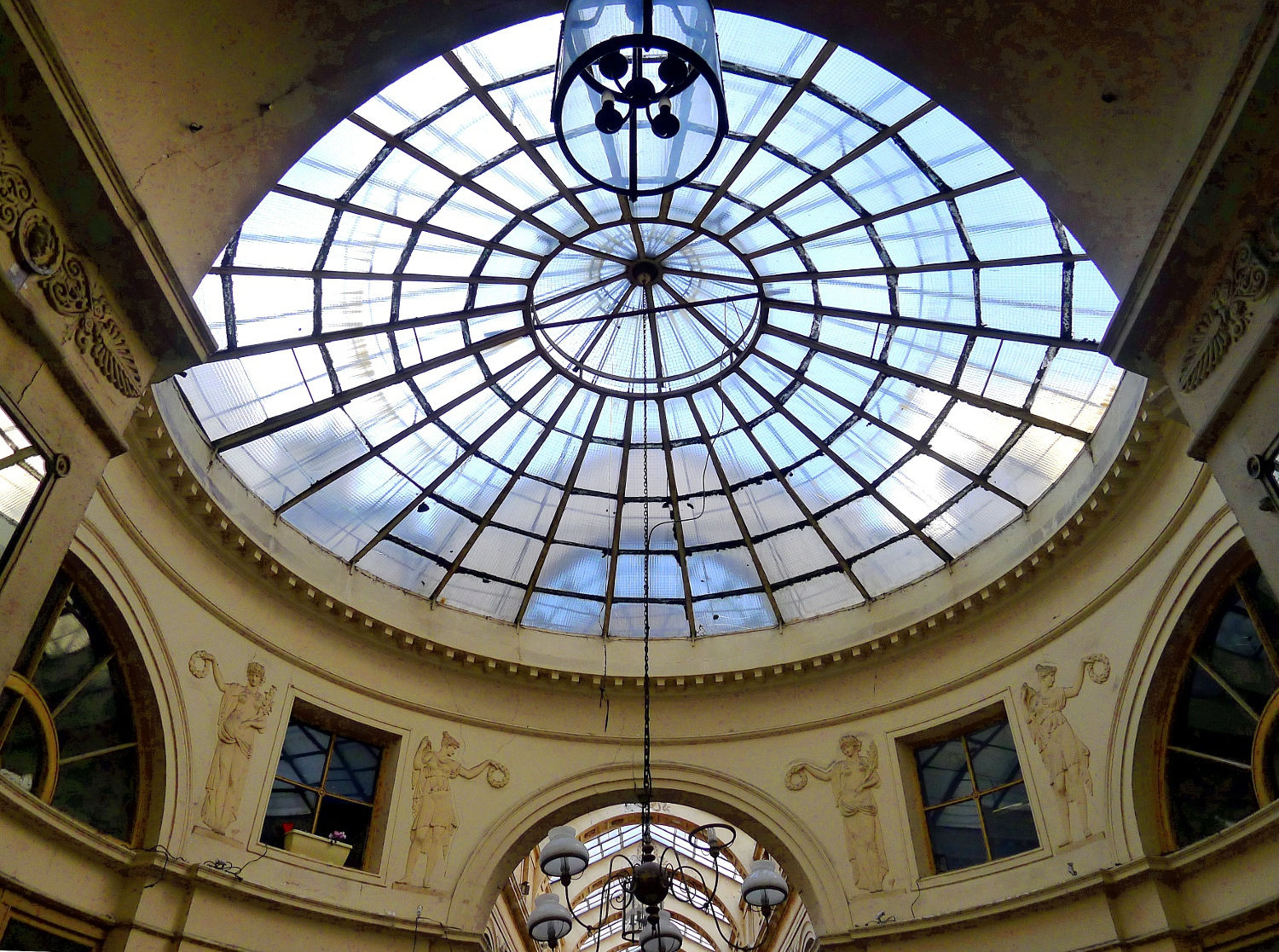
Rotunda and cupola

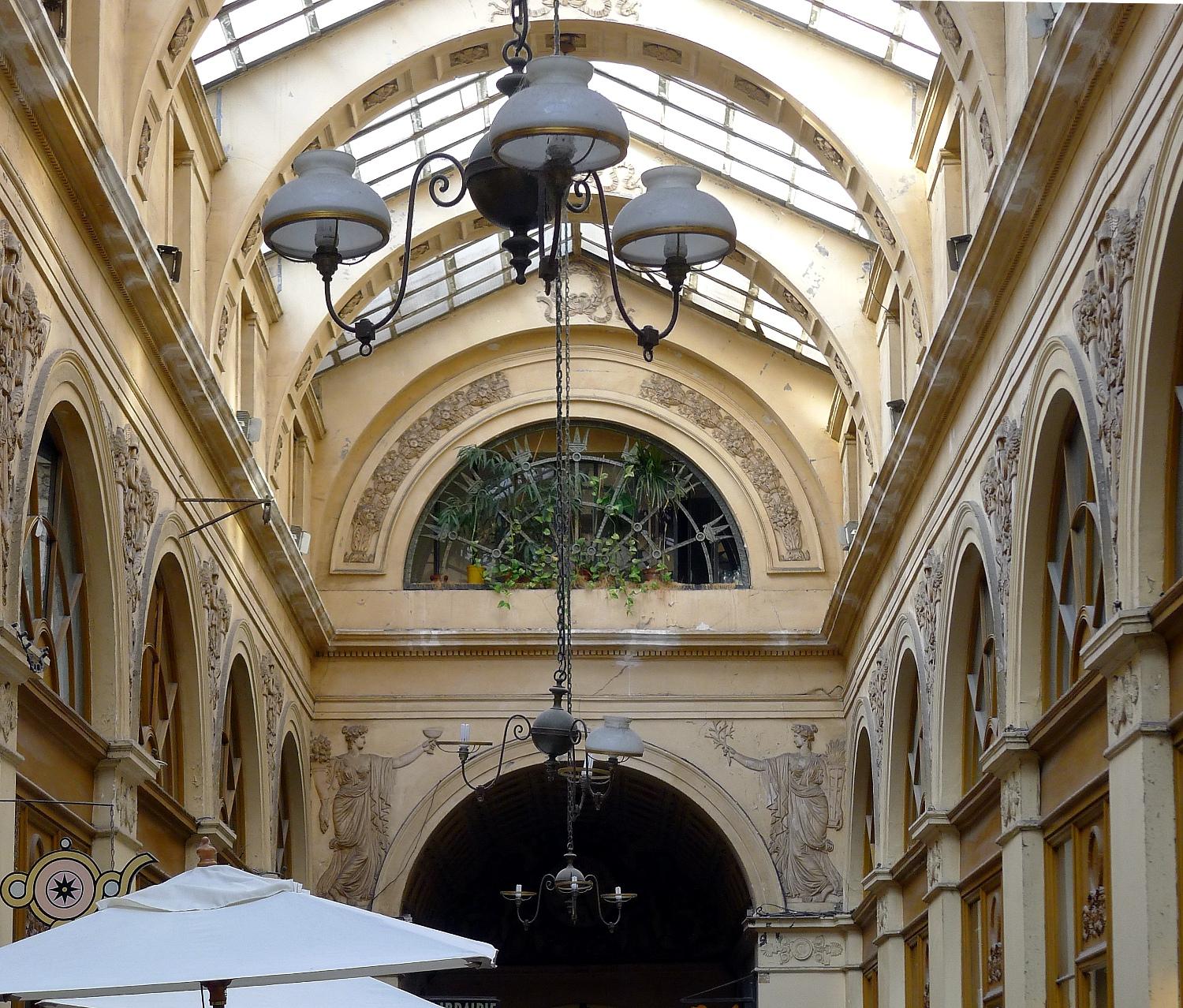
Architectural details

== See also ==
- Passage des Panoramas
- Galleria Vittorio Emanuele II
- Galleria Umberto I
