= Passage Choiseul =

Covered passage in Paris, France

Coordinates: 48°52′08″N 2°20′09″E

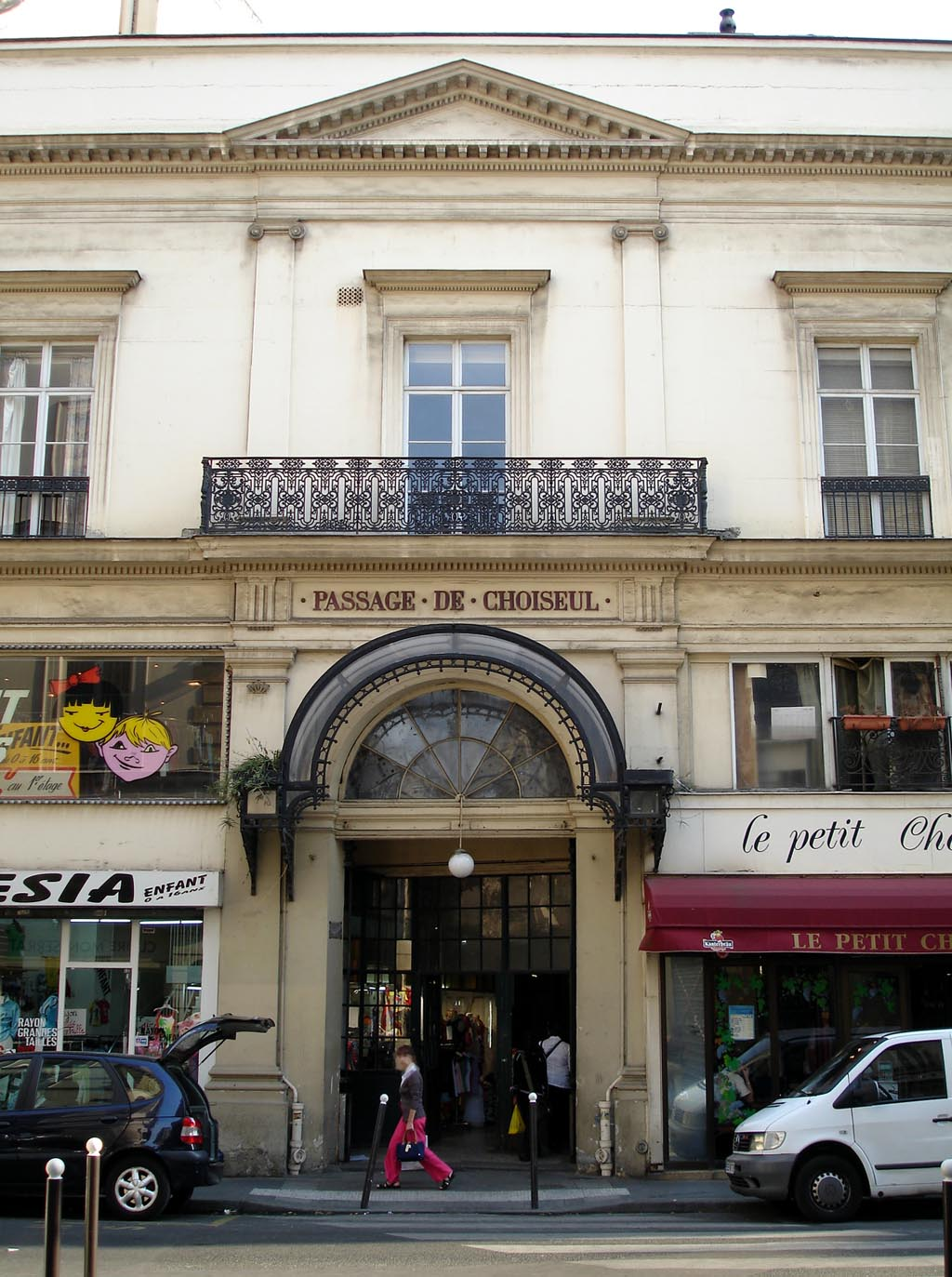
Entrance to the Passage Choiseul

The Passage Choiseul (French pronunciation: [pasaʒ ʃwazœl]) is one of the covered passages of Paris, located in the 2nd arrondissement. It is the continuation of the Rue de Choiseul.

== History ==
The Passage Choiseul is on a site previously occupied by four hôtels particuliers, acquired by the Mallet Bank for a real-estate development that included the Opéra-Comique's nearby Salle Ventadour. The passage was built between 1826 and 1827, first to the designs of the architect François Mazois, then Antoine Tavernier. Mazois died before the building was complete, and Tavernier completed the work.

The author Louis-Ferdinand Céline lived there as a child in the early 20th century. The Passage Choiseul is mentioned in two of his novels: Journey to the End of the Night and Death on the Installment Plan. Céline described it as having gas lamps that "stank as badly as the stagnant air", and the aroma of "dogs urine" in the passage.

In 1907, the glass roof was replaced (although its ironwork dates from 1891). The passage later fell into disrepair. In the 1970s, visitation increased when Kenzo opened a boutique in the passage. They have since relocated to the Place des Victoires.

== Today ==
The Passage Choiseul is a shopping and food area. It has restaurants, clothing stores, book stores, jewellery shops, art galleries, art supply shops and a hair stylist. The entrance to the Théâtre des Bouffes-Parisiens is located in the passage. The ground floor is mainly retail and the upper floors are primarily residential. It is the longest covered passage in the city, at 190 meters long and 3.7 meters wide. In 2012, renovations and restoration were begun under Jean Frédéric Grevet. It is a registered historic monument in France.

== Location ==
Located near the Métro stations: Pyramides and Quatre-Septembre.

It is just west of the Galerie Vivienne on the Rue des Petits-Champs in the 2nd arrondissement.
