= Galerie Véro-Dodat =

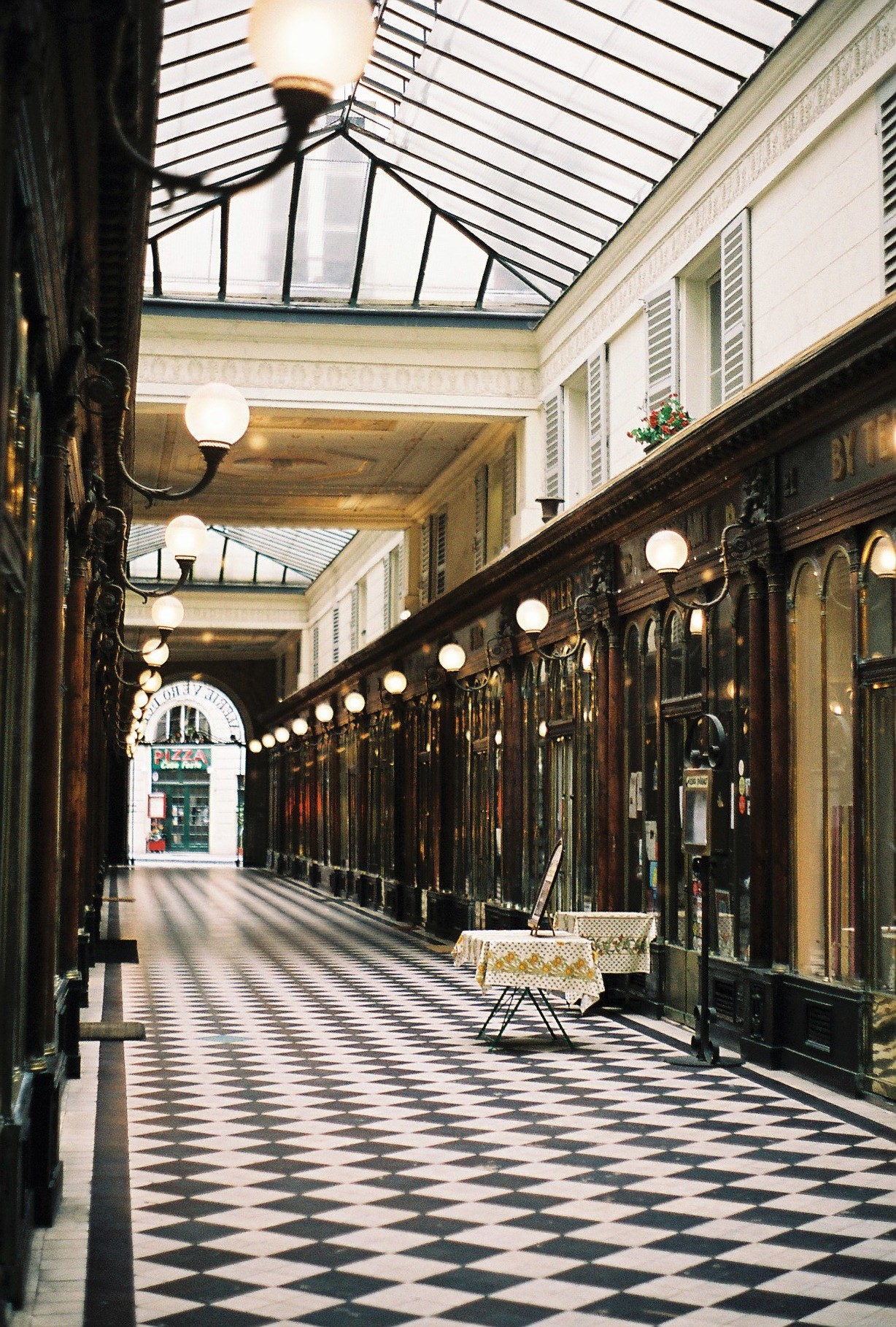
- Galerie Véro-Dodat

- Location within Paris

General information
- Type: Gallery
- Location: Paris, France
- Coordinates: 48°51′46″N 2°20′25″E
- Opened: 1826

The Galerie Véro-Dodat is one of the covered passages of Paris. It is located in the 1st arrondissement, connecting the Rue de Jean-Jacques Rousseau and the Rue Croix-des-Petits-Champs. It was built in 1826.

== History ==
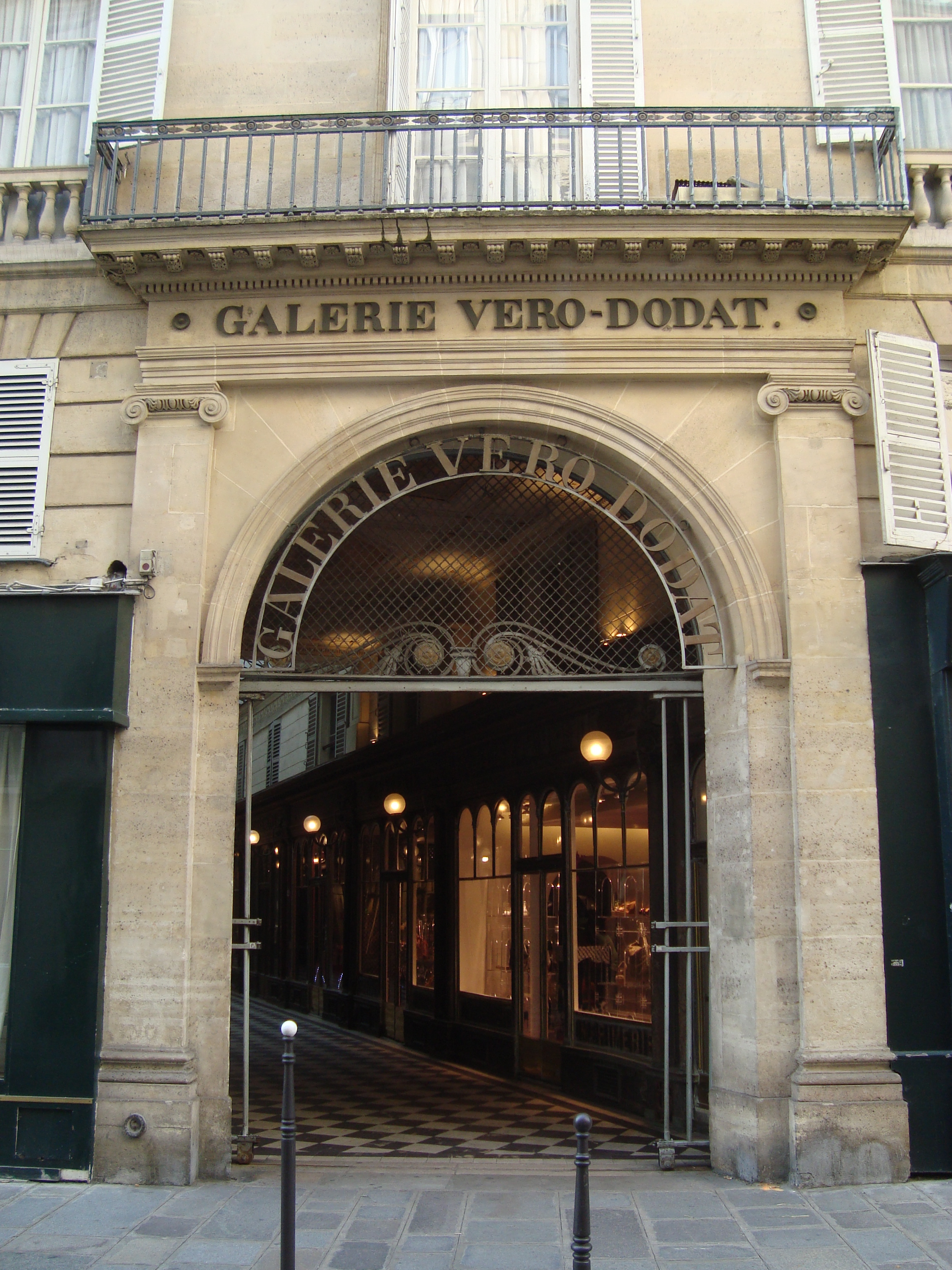
Entrance facing the Rue du Bouloi

The Galerie Véro-Dodat was built in 1826 by two charcutiers, connecting the Rue du Bouloi and the Rue de Jean-Jacques Rousseau between the Palais-Royal and Les Halles. This was during the Bourbon Restoration in the early 1800s, when covered passages or galeries in Paris were growing quickly in popularity. They provided warm, dry places for the wealthy to shop and dine on rainy, muddy days. In a time before paved streets and sewers, the galleries' billiards, bistros and public baths served as a grown-up playground for the emerging middle class. At the height of their popularity in the mid 19th century, there were more than 150 passages. However, with the advent of the department store around 1850, the galleries began to decline. Today, eighteen passages remain.

Véro-Dodat was one of the first of Paris's passageways to get gas lighting in 1830, and one of the last to fall into decline. Its decline began during the Second Empire with the demise of the Messageries Laffitte et Gaillard. It was listed as a French historical landmark on 9 June 1965 and was restored in 1997 to its former 19th-century, neoclassical glory, complete with its elegant shops specializing in antiques, objets d'art, art books and fashion accessories.

It is said this is where French writer Gérard de Nerval would often drink at the restaurant Café de l'Époque, located on the Rue Croix-des-Petits-Champs entrance of the gallery, and that is where he took his last drink before committing suicide by hanging in Châtelet. The actress Rachel occupied an apartment in the passage of 1838 in 1842. The print-seller Gabriel Aubert, editor of Le Charivari and of La Caricature, also settled there and introduced the gallery to the most famous caricaturists of the time.

== Description ==
The Galerie is neoclassical in style, with marble columns, gold trim, frescoes, and a black and white tiled floor. The passage is arranged to give an illusion of depth, the diagonal grid of black and white tiles, the low height of the ceiling decorated with paintings of landscapes where it is not glass, for shops on the alignment of a strict horizontal plane. The entries in the gallery are ionic arcades closed by gates. Entries are crowned with a balcony. The façade of the gallery on the Rue du Bouloi is decorated with two statues in niches representing Hermes with his winged helmet and a Caduceus hand, god of merchants, and Hercules dressed in the skin of Nemean lion.

== Retail ==
The Galerie Véro-Dodat is filled with mostly high-caliber, designer boutiques and antique shops. Among them are two Christian Louboutin stores, the women's Paris flagship boutique, and the world's first CL Men's store, Boutique Homme.

== Location ==
Located near the Metro station: Louvre - Rivoli.
