= Rue des Petits-Champs =

Street in Paris

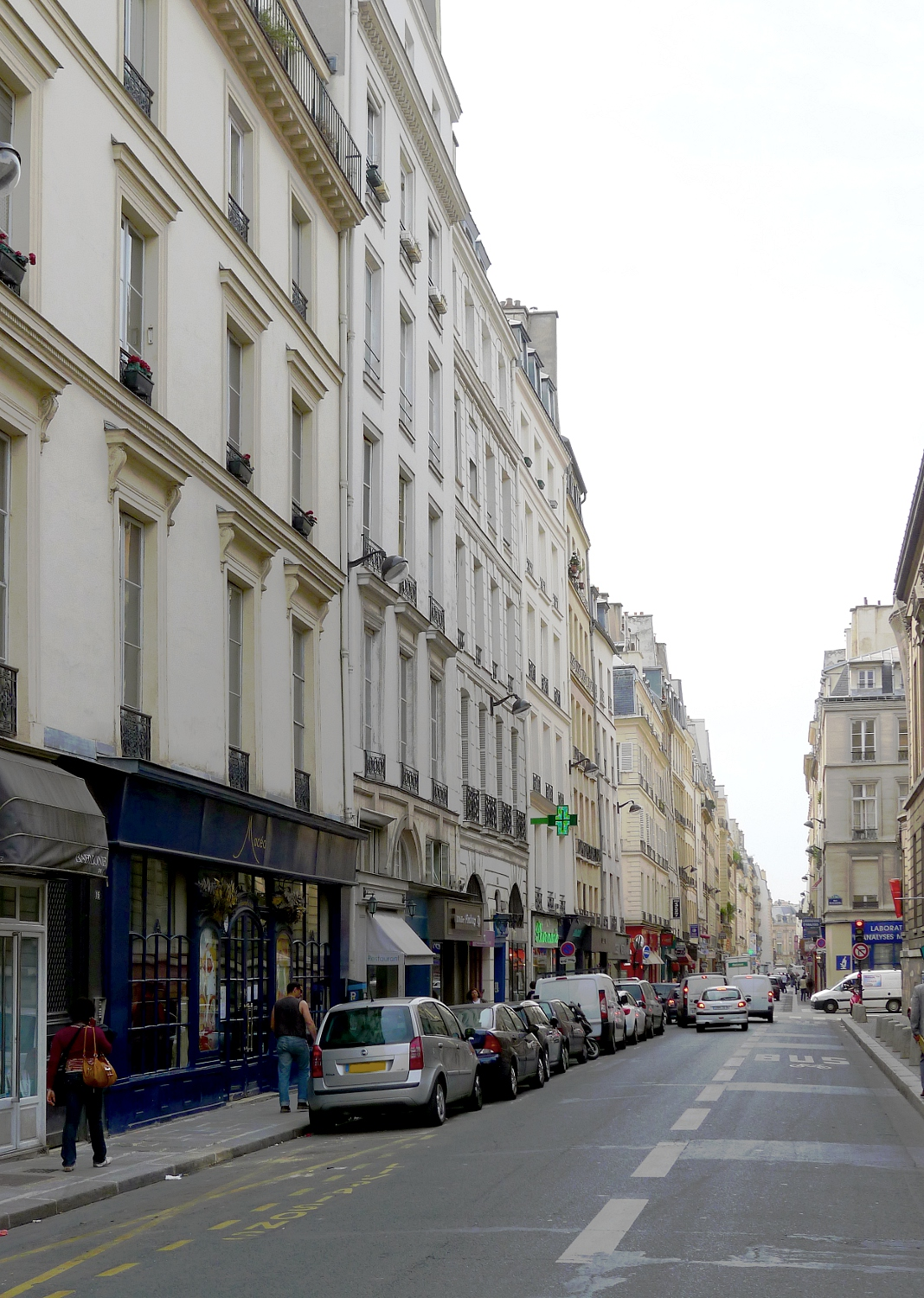
- Rue des Petits-Champs

- Location within Paris
- Former names: Rue Bautru; Rue Neuve-des-Petits-Champs
- Length: 450 m (1,480 ft)
- Width: 12 m (39 ft)
- Arrondissement: 1st, 2nd
- Quarter: Palais-Royal; Gaillon; Vivienne
- Coordinates: 48°52′01″N 2°20′10″E
- From: 1, rue de la Banque et rue La Vrillière
- To: 26, avenue de l'Opéra

Construction
- Completion: 1634
- Denomination: 24 January 1881

The Rue des Petits-Champs (French pronunciation: [ʁy de pəti ʃɑ̃]) is a street that runs through the 1st and 2nd arrondissement of Paris, France.

== Location ==
This one-way street, running east–west, is located between the Rue de la Banque and the Avenue de l'Opéra.

== History ==
It was officially created in 1634 by orders of the king during the construction of Palais-Cardinal. It was named the Rue Bautru, then the Rue Neuve-des-Petits-Champs. In 1881, it was given its present name. In 1944, the part of the Rue des Petits Champs that extends across Opera near the Place Vendôme was renamed the Rue Danielle Casanova after a French Resistance fighter who died in 1943.

== Name origin ==
The street received that name because of the small fields, or the large gardens, that used to be there (petits champs meaning "small fields" in French). There is a record of a street, in the same location and under the same name in the vicus de Parvis Campis (1273).

== Buildings of note ==
The Rue des Petits-Champs is lined by several impressive mansions:

- No. 4: Galerie Vivienne, a registered historical monument, one of the most iconic covered passages in Paris.
- No. 6: Bibliothèque Nationale de France, site Richelieu (Galerie Colbert Entrance)
- No. 8: Hôtel du Président Tubeuf, built in 1635, houses the national library's departments of Maps and Plans and Etchings and Photography.
- No. 40: Passage Choiseul, the longest covered passage in Paris.

== Closest transport ==
Metro: Line 3 (Quatre Septembre), 1 & 7 (Palais-Royal-Musée du Louvre), 7 & 14 (Pyramides)

Bus: Lines 39 (Bus Sainte-Anne - Petits Champs), 68 21 27 95 (Pyramides)

== Trivia ==
- Jean-Jacques Rousseau lived at number 57.
- Louis-Ferdinand Céline (né Destouches) grew up at no. 40 rue des Petits-Champs, in the Passage Choiseul where his mother owned a lace and lingerie shop with family quarters upstairs.
- Henri Paul Deputy Director of Security at the Hôtel Ritz Paris and driver of the car in the crash that killed Diana, Princess of Wales on 31 August 1997 lived in an apartment on the fifth floor at number 33 Rue des Petits-Champs.
- Fictional private eye Nestor Burma has his office at Rue des Petits-Champs.
