= Passage des Panoramas =

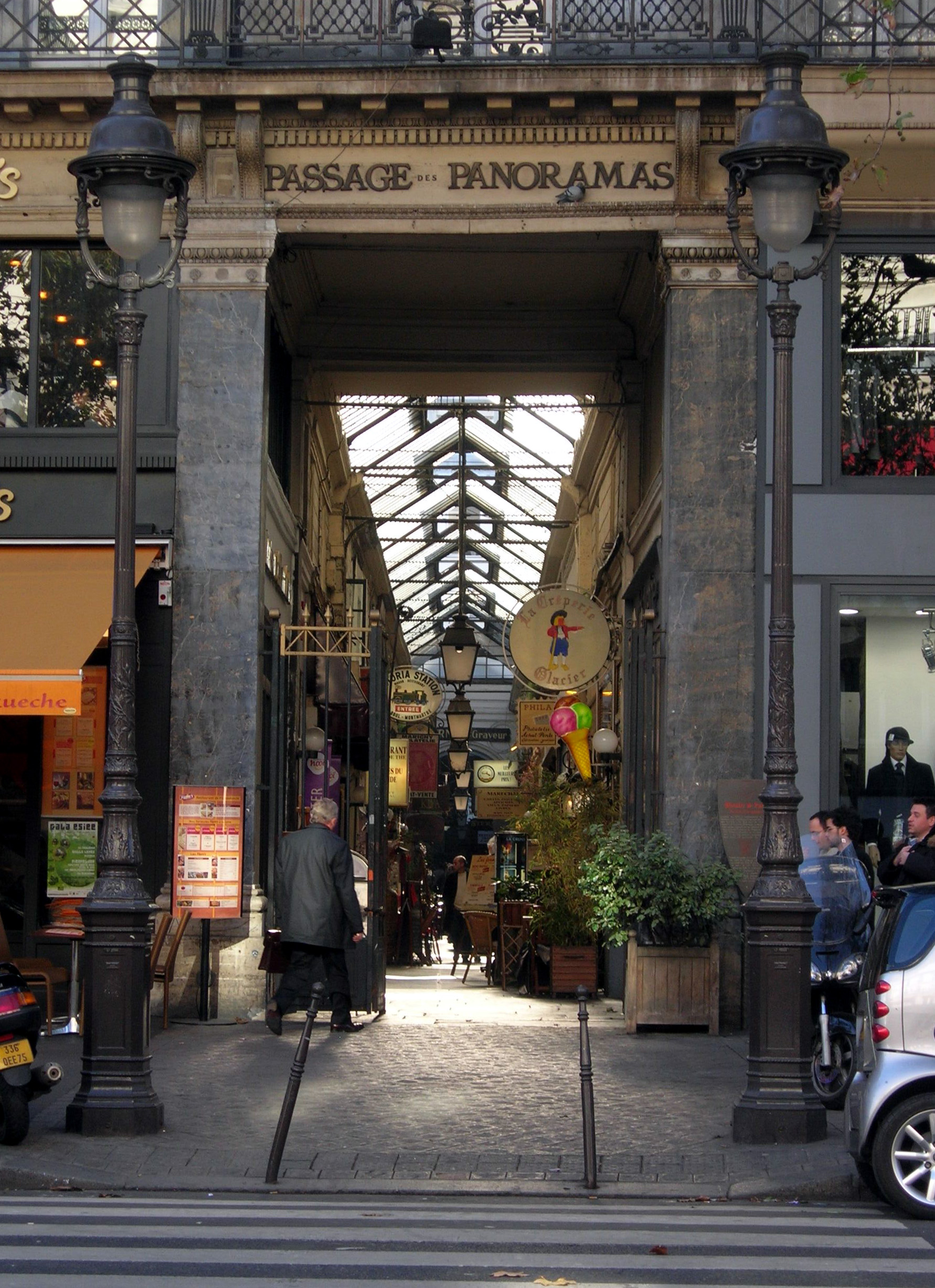
- Passage des Panoramas

- Location within Paris

General information
- Type: Gallery
- Location: Paris, France
- Coordinates: 48°52′16″N 2°20′30″E
- Opened: 1799

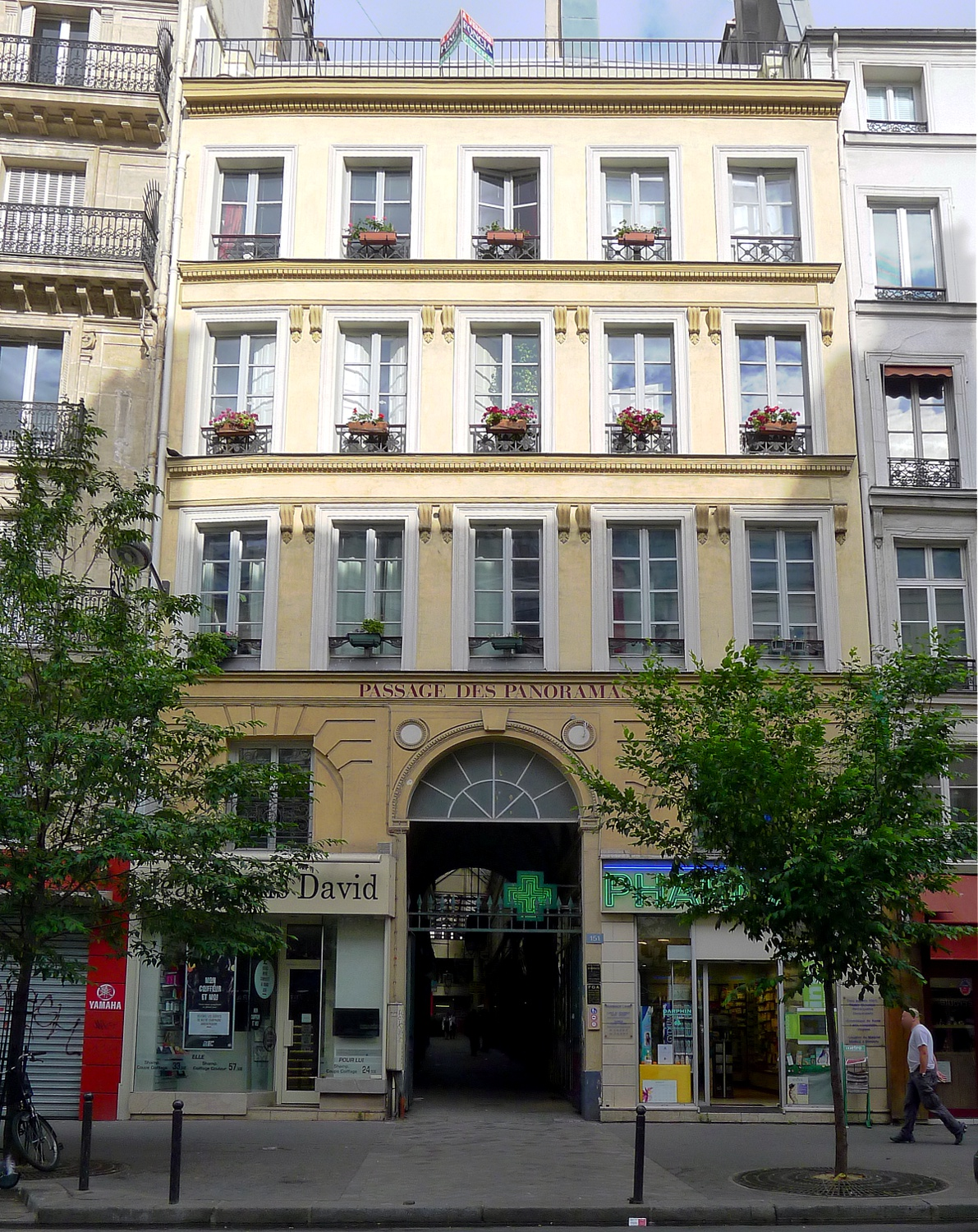
Façade on the Rue Montmartre

The Passage des Panoramas (French pronunciation: [pasaʒ de panɔʁama]) is the oldest of the covered passages of Paris, located in the 2nd arrondissement between the Boulevard Montmartre to the north and the Rue Saint-Marc to the south. It is one of the earliest venues of the Parisian philatelic trade, and it was one of the first covered commercial passageways in Europe. Bazaars and souks in the Orient had roofed commercial passageways centuries earlier, but the Passage de Panoramas innovated in having glazed roofing and, later on, in 1817, gas lights for illumination. It was an ancestor of the city gallerias of the 19th century and the covered suburban and city shopping malls of the 20th century.

== History ==
The passage was built in 1799 and opened in 1800 on the site of the town residence of the Marechal de Montmorency, Duke of Luxembourg, which had been built in 1704. The doorway of the modern building, which opened on the Rue Saint-Marc, facing the Rue des Panoramas, was the gateway of the original mansion. Its name came from an attraction built on the site; two large rotundas where panoramic paintings of Paris, Toulon, Rome, Jerusalem, and other famous cities were displayed. They were a business venture of the American inventor Robert Fulton, who had come to Paris to offer his latest inventions, the steamboat, submarine, and torpedo, to Napoleon and the French Directory. While waiting for an answer, Fulton earned money from his exhibition. Napoleon, who had little interest in the navy, finally rejected Fulton's projects. Fulton left behind his Panoramas and went to London to offer his inventions to the British.

In 1800, Paris streets were narrow, dark, muddy and crowded, and very few had sidewalks or lighting; they were very unpleasant for shopping. The first indoor gallery, at the Palais-Royal, had opened in 1786, followed by the passage Feydau in 1790–91, the Passage du Caire in 1799, and the Passage des Panoramas in 1800. The rotundas were destroyed in 1831. In the 1830s, the architect Jean-Louis Victor Grisart renovated the passage and created three additional galleries inside the block of houses: the Saint-Marc gallery parallel with the passage, the gallery of the Variétés which gives access to the entry of the artists of the Théâtre de Variétés, and the Feydeau galleries and Montmartre. Stern the famous engraver settled there in 1834, then merchants of postcards and postage stamps, and some restaurants moved in. The part of the passage close to the Boulevard Montmartre is richly decorated, while the distant part is more modest. The passage, as it was in 1867, is described in chapter VII of Émile Zola's novel Nana.
