= 2nd arrondissement of Paris =

- Municipal arrondissement
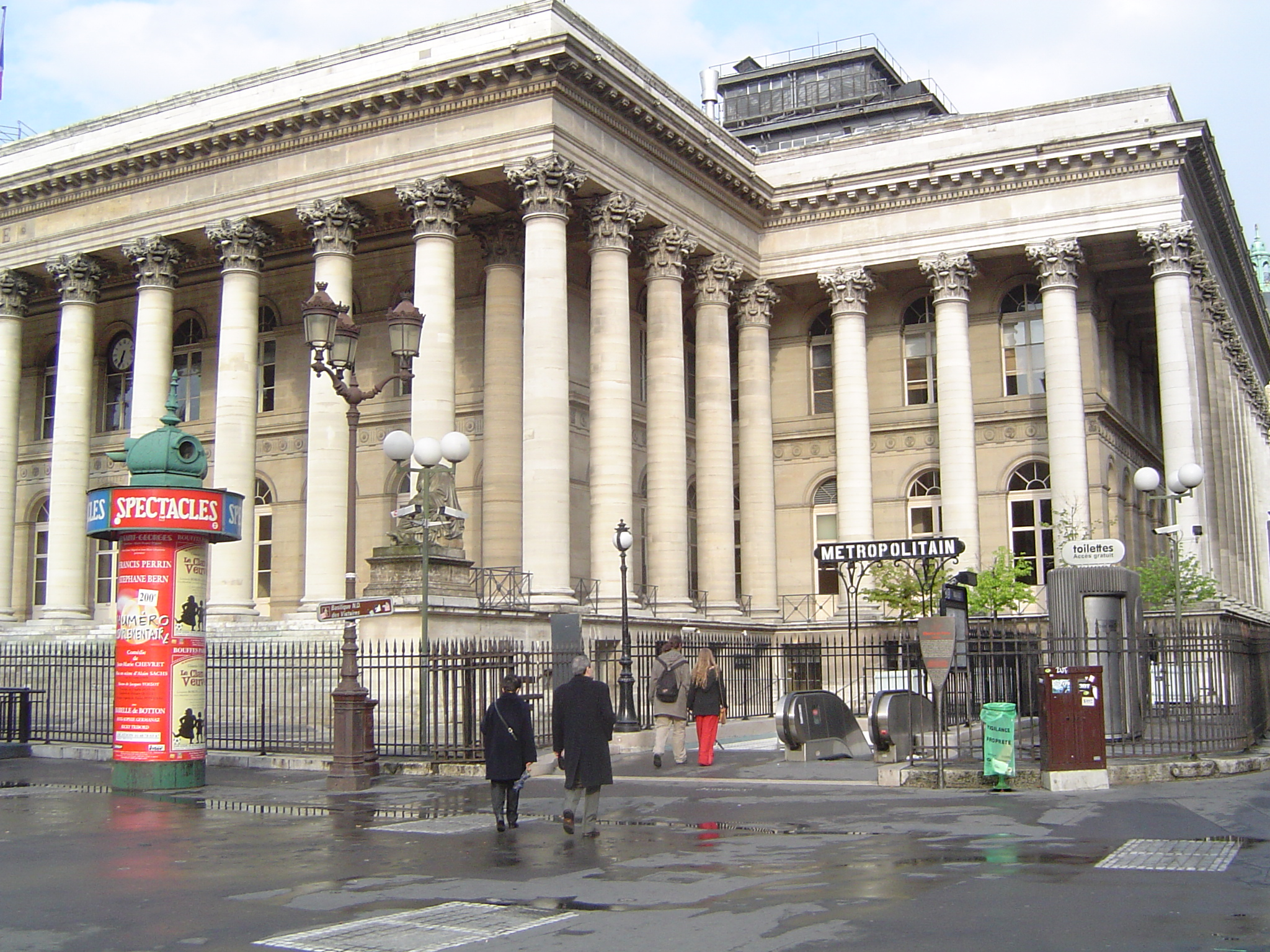
- The former Paris Bourse

- Coat of arms

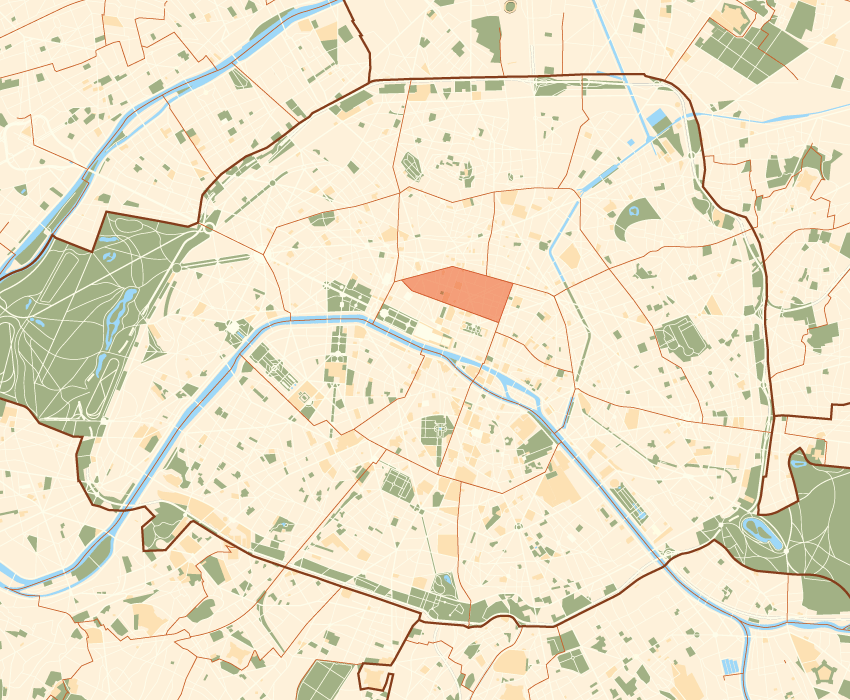
- Location within Paris
- Coordinates: 48°52′09″N 2°20′26″E
- Country: France
- Region: Île-de-France
- Department: Paris
- Commune: Paris

Government
  - Mayor (2020–2026): Ariel Weil (PS)
- Area: 0.992 km^{2} (0.383 sq mi)
- Population (2023): 19,847
  - Density: 20,000/km^{2} (51,800/sq mi)
- INSEE code: 75102

The 2nd arrondissement of Paris (II^{e} arrondissement) is one of the 20 arrondissements of the capital city of France. In spoken French, this arrondissement is colloquially referred to as deuxième (second/the second). It is governed locally together with the 1st, 3rd and 4th arrondissement, with which it forms the 1st sector of Paris. In 2023, it had a population of 19,847.

Also known as Bourse, this arrondissement is located on the right bank of the River Seine. The 2nd arrondissement, together with the adjacent 8th and 9th arrondissements, hosts an important business district, centred on the Paris Opéra, which houses the city's most dense concentration of business activities. The arrondissement contains the former Paris Bourse (stock exchange) and several banking headquarters, as well as a textile district, known as the Sentier, and the Opéra-Comique's theatre, the Salle Favart. The 2nd arrondissement is the home of Grand Rex, the largest movie theater in Paris.

The 2nd arrondissement is also the home of most of Paris's surviving 19th-century glazed commercial arcades. At the beginning of the 19th century, most of the streets of Paris were dark, muddy, and lacked sidewalks. A few entrepreneurs copied the success of the Passage des Panoramas and its well-lit, dry, and paved pedestrian passageways. By the middle of the 19th century, there were about two dozen of these commercial malls, but most of them disappeared as the Paris authorities paved the main streets and added sidewalks, as well as gas street lighting. The commercial survivors are – in addition to the Passage des Panoramas – the Galerie Vivienne, the Passage Choiseul, the Galerie Colbert, the Passage des Princes, the Passage du Grand Cerf, the Passage du Caire, the Passage Lemoine, the Passage Jouffroy, the Passage Basfour, the Passage du Bourg-L'abbé, and the Passage du Ponceau.

== Geography ==
The 2nd arrondissement is Paris's smallest arrondissement, with a land area of just 0.992 km^{2}, or 99.2 hectares (0.383 sq. miles, or 245 acres).

== Demographics ==
The 2nd arrondissement reached its peak of settlement in the years before 1861, although it has only existed in its current shape since the re-organization of Paris in 1860. As of the 1999 census, the number of jobs provided there was 61,672 – this despite a land area of only 0.992 km^{2}, making it the arrondissement with the densest concentration of commercial activity in the capital, with an average of 62,695 jobs per km^{2}.

=== Historical population ===
Historical population

Year	Pop.	±% p.a.
1861	81,609	—
1872	73,578	−0.94%
1881	77,442	+0.57%
1891	69,812	−1.03%
1901	64,267	−0.82%
1911	60,404	−0.62%
1921	53,317	−1.24%
1931	44,311	−1.83%
1936	41,780	−1.17%
1946	41,419	−0.09%
1954	43,857	+0.72%

Year	Pop.	±% p.a.
1962	40,864	−0.88%
1968	35,357	−2.38%
1975	26,328	−4.12%
1982	21,203	−3.05%
1990	20,738	−0.28%
1999	19,585	−0.63%
2007	21,745	+1.32%
2012	22,390	+0.59%
2017	20,900	−1.37%
2023	19,847	−0.86%

Source: Demographia (1861-1999) and INSEE (1876-2023)

=== Immigration ===
Place of birth of residents of the 2nd arrondissement in 1999
Born in metropolitan France	Born outside metropolitan France			
71.4%	28.6%			
71.4%	Born in overseas France	Born in foreign countries with French citizenship at birth^{1}	EU-15 immigrants^{2}	Non-EU-15 immigrants
71.4%	0.8%	3.8%	6.1%	17.9%
^{1} This group is made up largely of former French settlers, such as pieds-noirs in Northwest Africa, followed by former colonial citizens who had French citizenship at birth (such as was often the case for the native elite in French colonies), as well as to a lesser extent foreign-born children of French expatriates. A foreign country is understood as a country not part of France in 1999, so a person born for example in 1950 in Algeria, when Algeria was an integral part of France, is nonetheless listed as a person born in a foreign country in French statistics.^{2} An immigrant is a person born in a foreign country not having French citizenship at birth. An immigrant may have acquired French citizenship since moving to France, but is still considered an immigrant in French statistics. On the other hand, persons born in France with foreign citizenship (the children of immigrants) are not listed as immigrants.

== Economy ==
The French newspaper L'Obs has its head office in the arrondissement. Bourbon has its head office in the arrondissement. All Nippon Airways has its Paris Office in the arrondissement. China Airlines also has its France office in the arrondissement.

Aigle Azur's registered office is in the arrondissement.

== Education ==
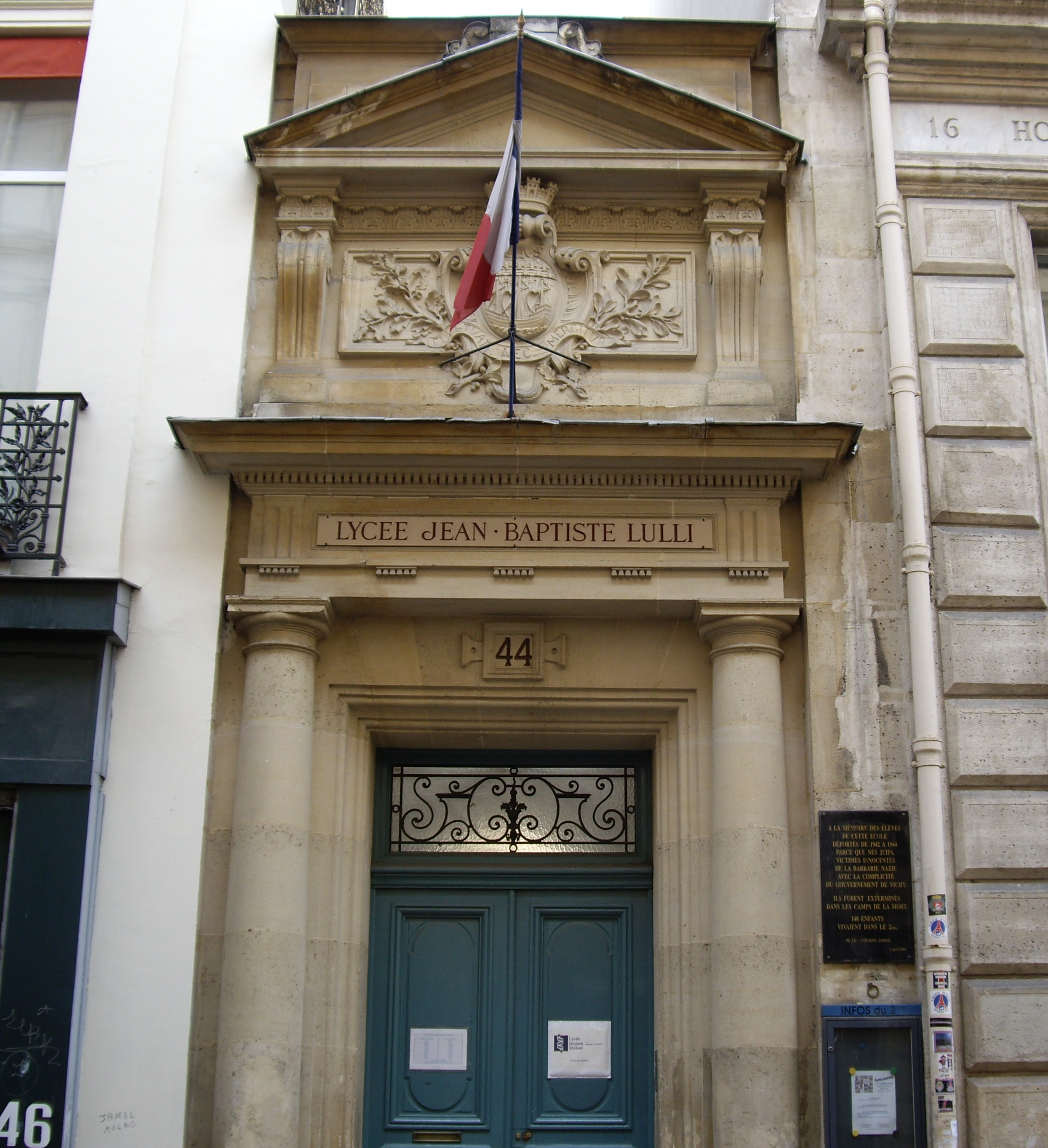
Lycée Jean-Baptiste Lulli

In terms of state-operated schools, the second arrondissement has three nursery schools (écoles maternelles), five primary schools (écoles élémentaires), and one high school (lycée).

The nursery schools are École Maternelle Dussoubs, École Maternelle Saint Denis, and École Maternelle Vivienne. The primary schools are École Élémentaire Beauregard, École Élémentaire Dussoubs, École Élémentaire Etienne Marcel, École Élémentaire Jussienne, and École Élémentaire Louvois. Collège César Franck is the sole state-operated high school in the arrondissement.

École Élémentaire Privée Saint-Sauveur is the sole private primary school institution in the second arrondissement. Private secondary school institutions include École du 2nd Degré Général Privée Rene Reaumur, École Générale et Technologique Privée Lafayette, École du 2nd degré professionnel privée CTRE PRI ENS SOINS ESTHETIQUES, École du 2nd degré professionnel privée EC INTERNATIONALE DE COIFFURE, École du 2nd degré professionnel privée ECOLE DE BIJOUTERIE-JOAILLERIE, and École technologique privée ITECOM INST TECHN COMMUNIC.

== Map ==
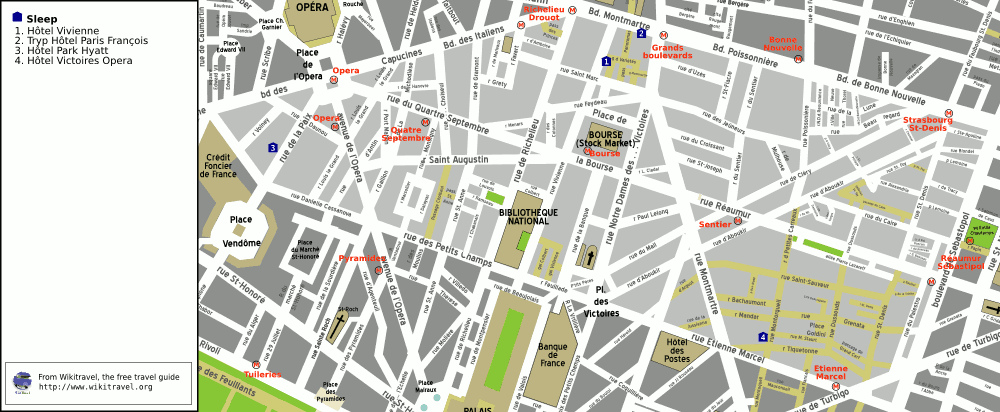
Map of the 2nd arrondissement

== Cityscape ==
=== Quarters of the arrondissement ===
The quarters of the 2ndarrondissement

- Quartier Gaillon (5)
- Quartier Vivienne (6)
- Quartier Mail (7)
- Quartier Bonne-Nouvelle (8)

=== Places of interest in the arrondissement ===
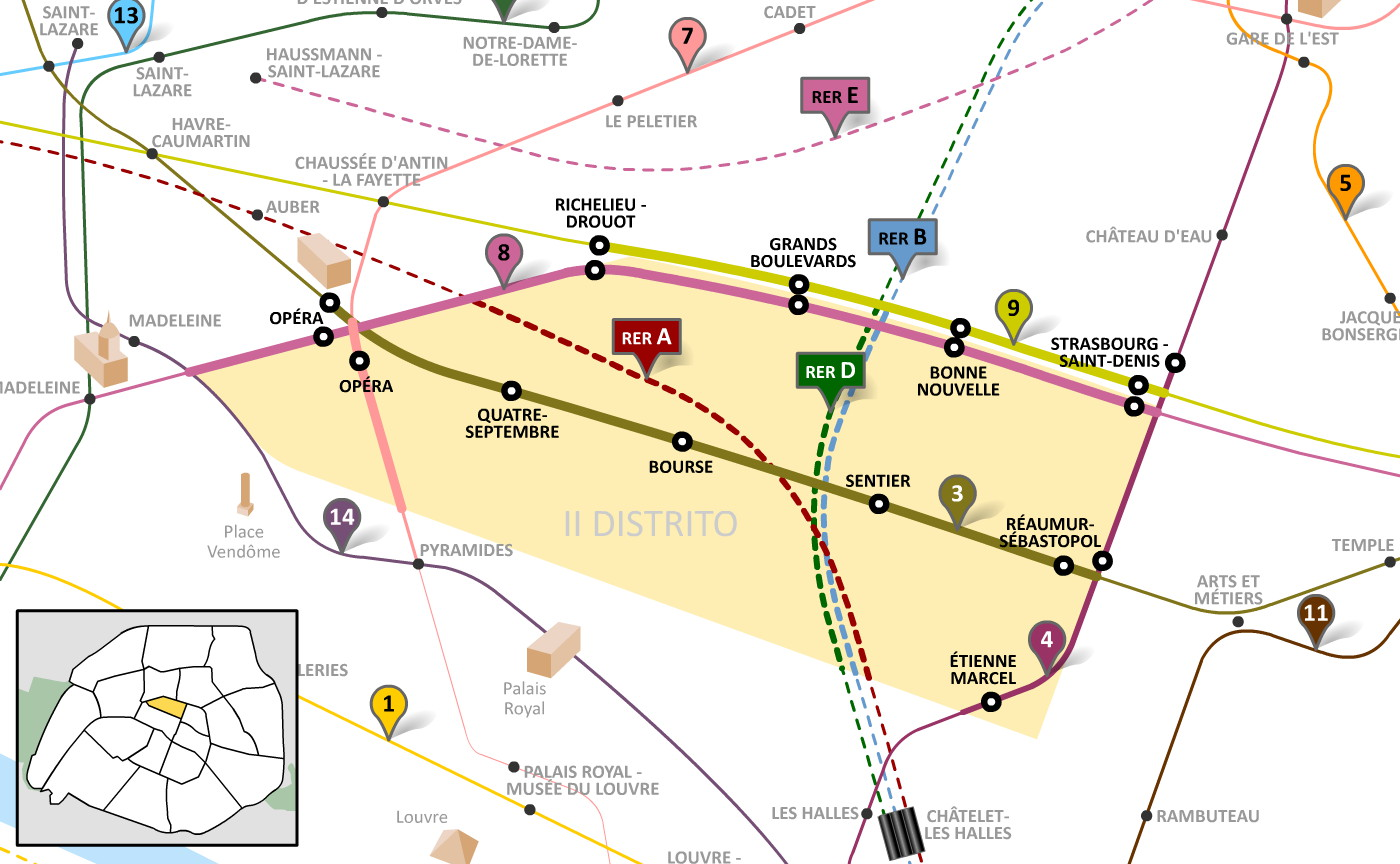

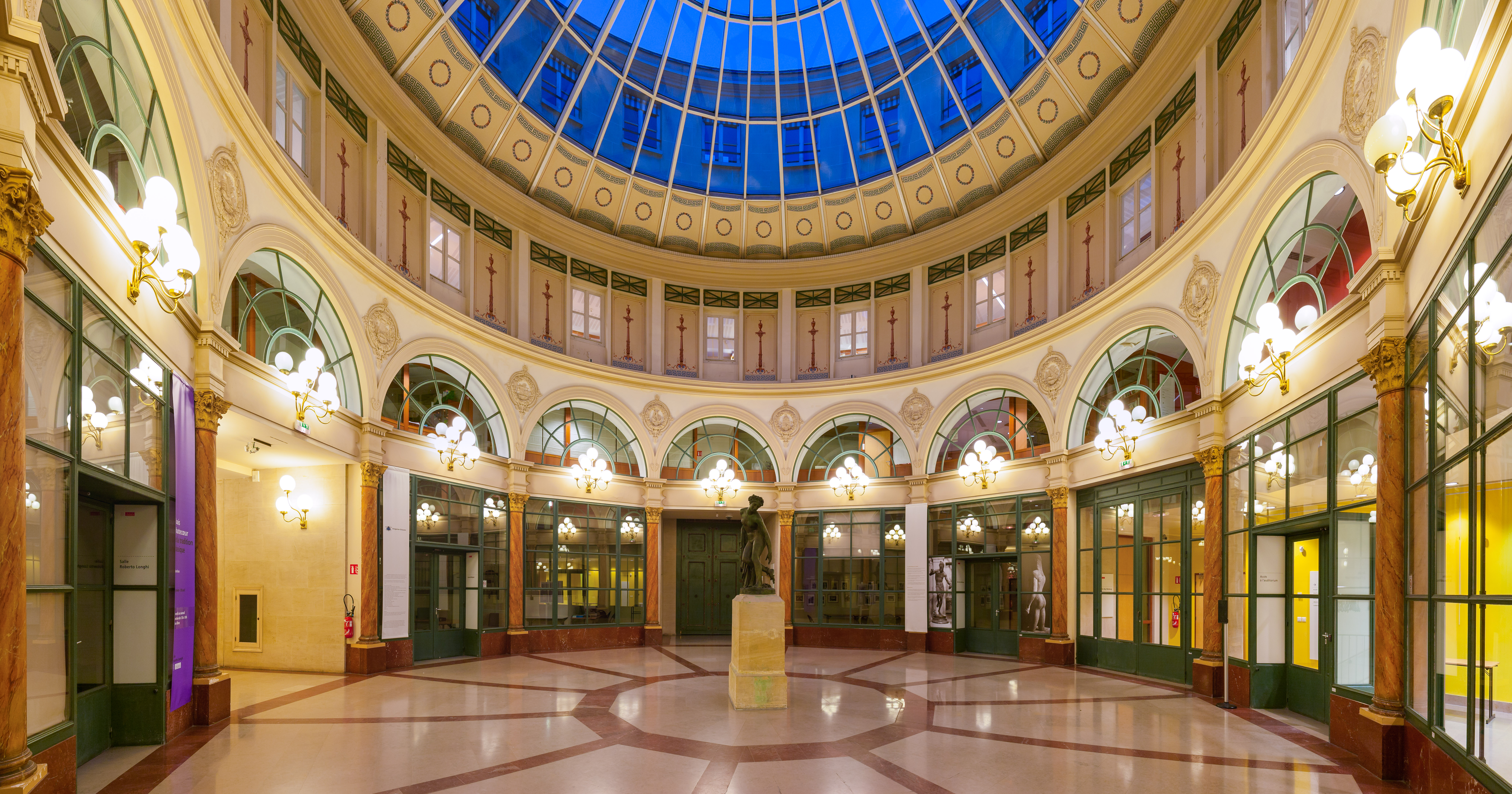
Rotunda of the Galerie Colbert, built in 1826 as a rival to the next and then very popular "Galerie Vivienne" covered passageway

- Bibliothèque nationale de France historical building (site Richelieu) (Monument historique)
- Galerie Colbert
- Opéra-Comique
- Paris stock exchange (Palais Brongniart, former headquarters)
- Passage des Panoramas
- Théâtre des Bouffes Parisiens
- Théâtre des Variétés
- Théâtre-Musée des Capucines, a perfume museum
- Tour Jean sans Peur, the last vestige of the Hôtel de Bourgogne

=== Former buildings in the arrondissement ===
- Salle Feydeau
- Salle de la Bourse
- Théâtre de l'Hôtel de Bourgogne

=== Main streets and squares ===
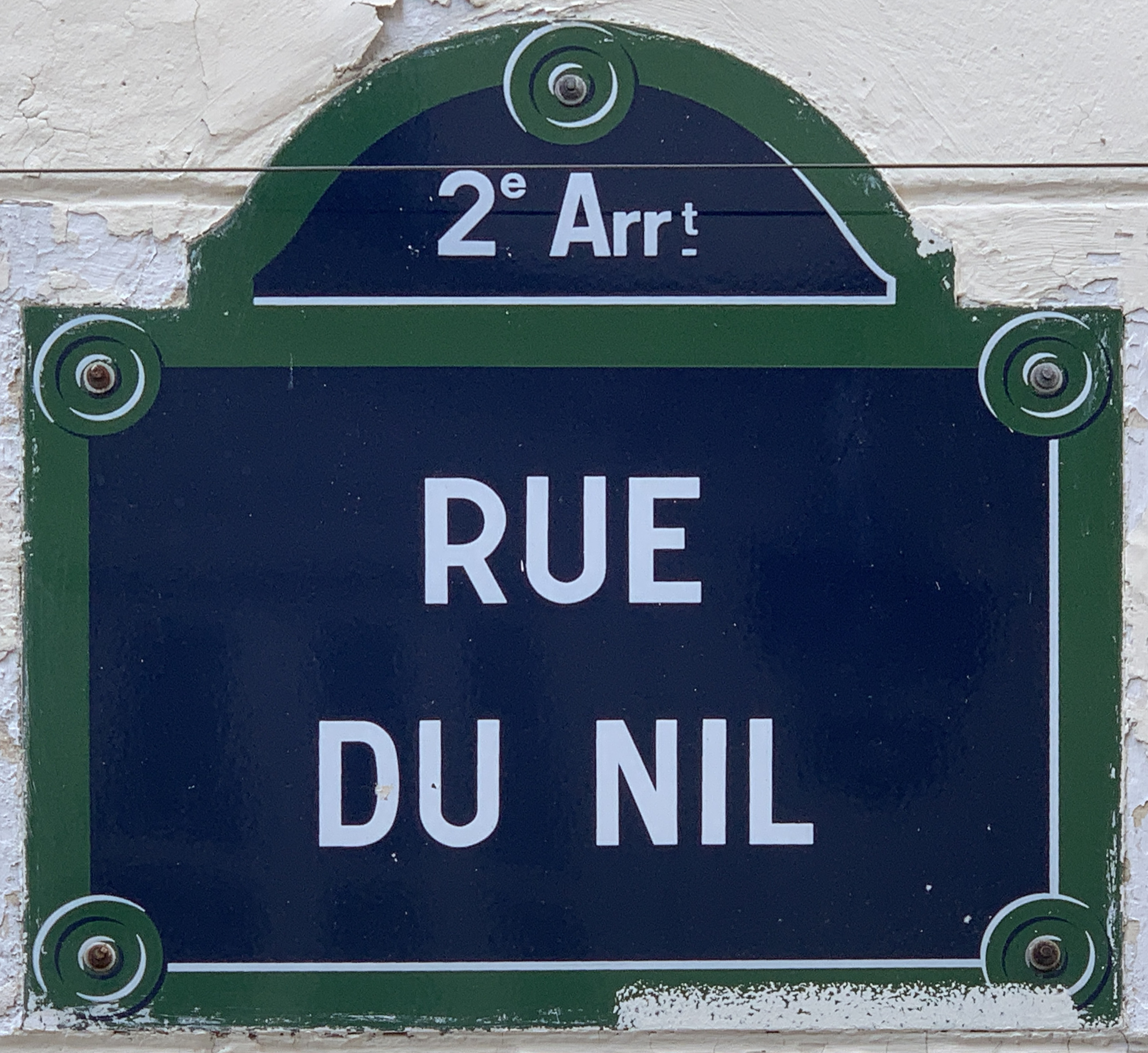
Rue du Nil

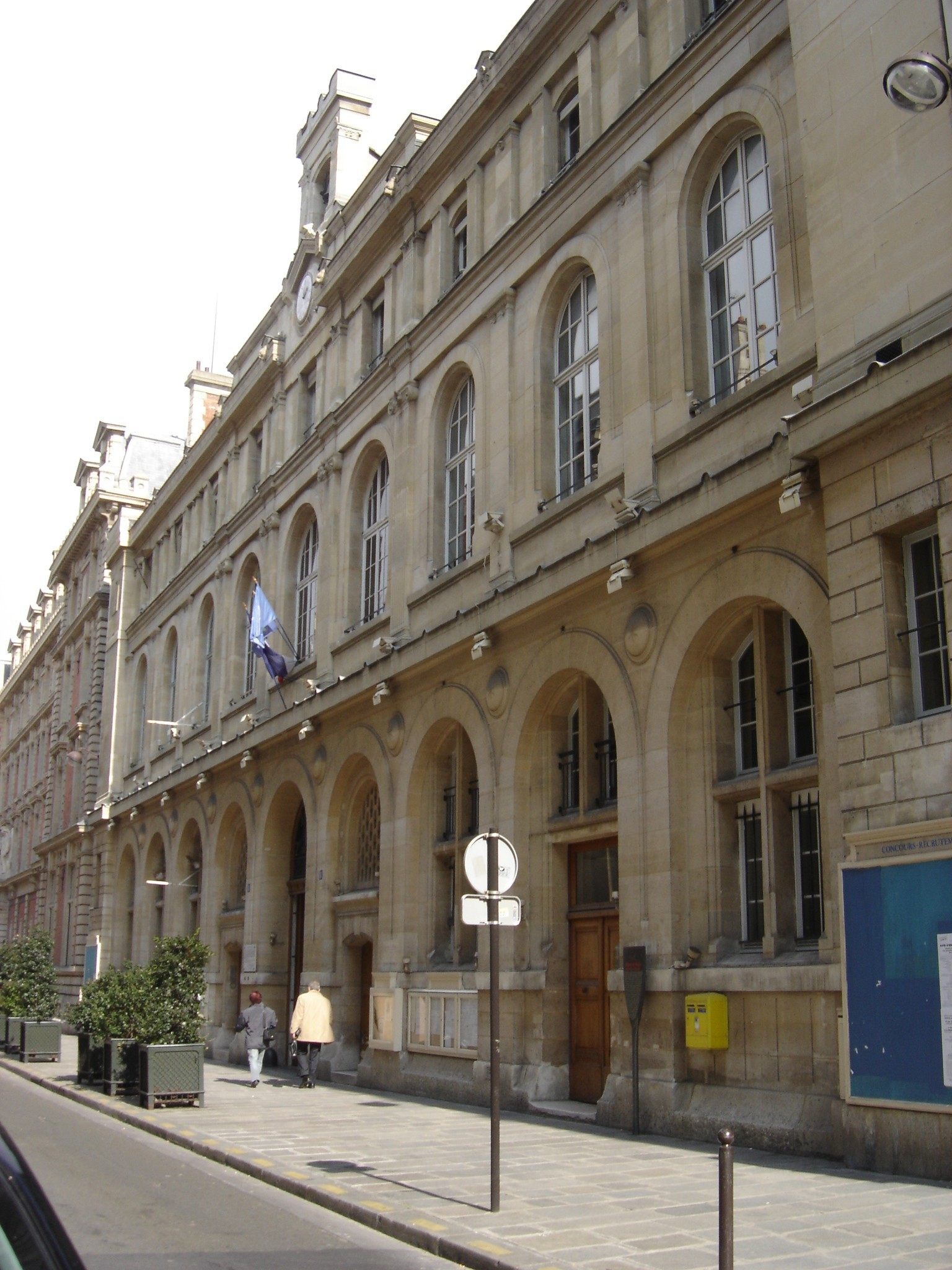
Former town hall at 8 rue de la Banque

There are several streets with an Egyptian connection in the area, reflecting interest in Napoleon's Egypt expedition of 1798–1801: rue du Nil, rue du Caire, passage du Caire, rue d'Aboukir, and rue d'Alexandrie.

- Rue de la Banque
- Place de la Bourse
- Boulevard de Bonne-Nouvelle
- Boulevard des Capucines
- Rue des Capucines
- Rue de Cléry
- Rue Étienne-Marcel
- Rue du Faubourg-Montmartre
- Boulevard des Italiens
- Rue du Louvre
- Rue Monsigny
- Boulevard Montmartre
- Rue Montmartre
- Rue Montorgueil
- Rue Notre-Dame des Victoires
- Avenue de l'Opéra (partial)
- Rue de la Paix
- Rue des Petits-Champs
- Boulevard Poissonnière
- Rue du Quatre-Septembre
- Rue Réaumur
- Rue de Richelieu (partial)
- Boulevard Saint-Denis
- Rue Saint-Denis
- Rue Sainte-Anne
- Rue Saint-Sauveur
- Boulevard Sébastopol
- Rue de Turbigo
- Place des Victoires (partial)
