= Lariboisière Hospital =

Coordinates: 48.8831°N 2.35306°E

- Assistance Publique – Hôpitaux de Paris
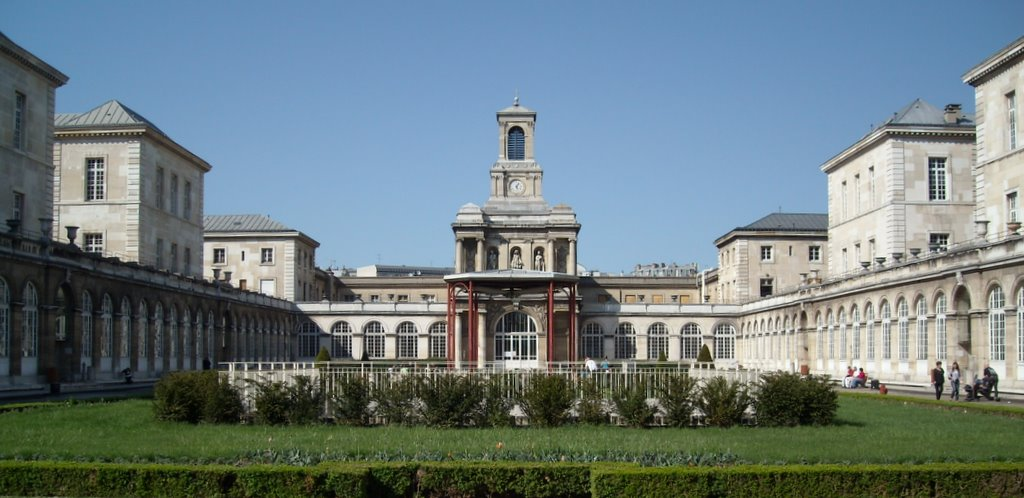
- Lariboisière Hospital, interior courtyard

Geography
- Location: Paris, Île-de-France, France

Organisation
- Care system: Public
- Type: Teaching
- Affiliated university: Université Paris Cité

Services
- Emergency department: Yes
- Beds: 1333

Links
- Website: http://hopital-lariboisiere.aphp.fr
- Lists: Hospitals in France

Lariboisière Hospital (French: Hôpital Lariboisière, pronounced [opital laʁibwazjɛʁ]) is a hospital in the 10th arrondissement of Paris, France.

The hospital was one of several built following the second cholera pandemic, which had reached Paris in 1832, and which led to a new emphasis on hygienic practices in hospitals. It was built from 1846 to 1853 under architect Pierre Gauthier, with six buildings arranged around a central courtyard, connected by colonnaded walkways. The grounds include the funeral monument, by Carlo Marochetti, of Élisa de Lariboisière, who donated a large portion of the funds for the hospital's construction.

It is a teaching hospital of Université Paris Cité.

(See also:Chapel of Lariboisiere Hospital, Paris)
