= 10th arrondissement of Paris =

- Municipal arrondissement
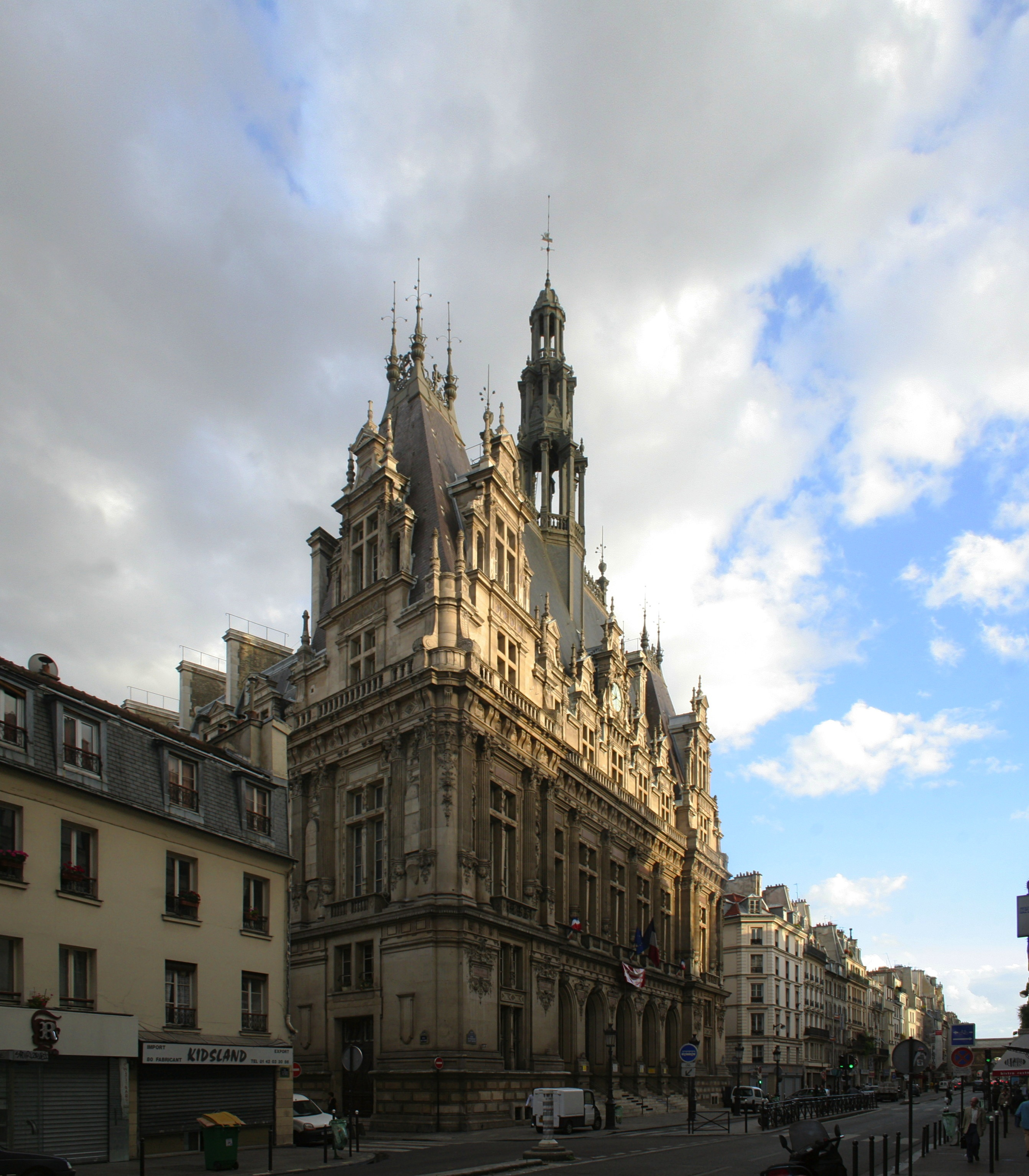
- The local town hall, on the Rue du Faubourg Saint-Martin

- Coat of arms

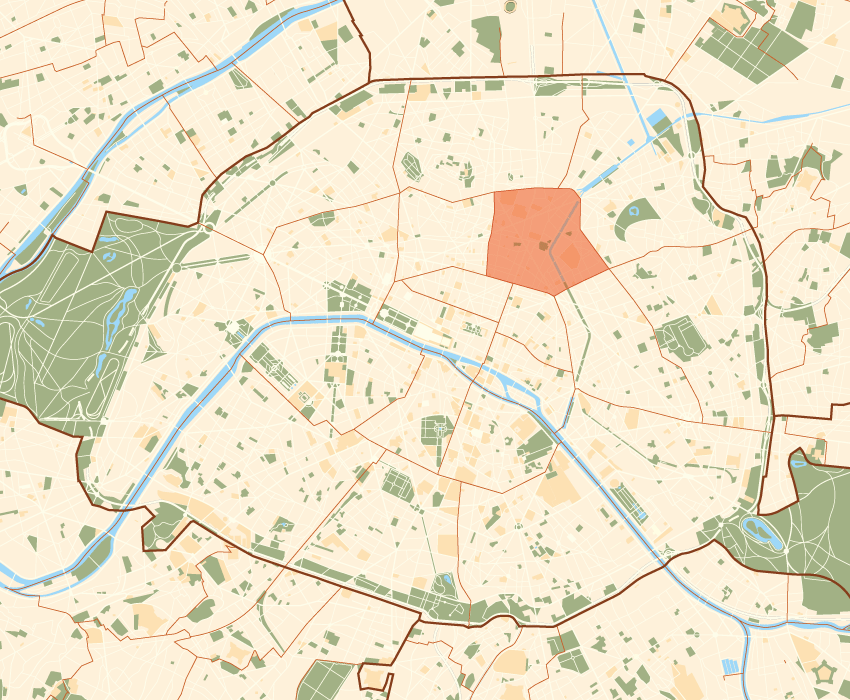
- Location within Paris
- Coordinates: 48°52′32″N 2°21′28″E
- Country: France
- Region: Île-de-France
- Department: Paris
- Commune: Paris

Government
  - Mayor (2020–2026): Alexandra Cordebard (PS)
- Area: 2.89 km^{2} (1.12 sq mi)
- Population (2023): 83,873
  - Density: 29,000/km^{2} (75,200/sq mi)
- INSEE code: 75110

The 10th arrondissement of Paris (X^{e} arrondissement) is one of the 20 arrondissements of the capital city of France. In spoken French, the arrondissement is referred to as le dixième ([dizjɛm]; "the tenth", formally le dixième arrondissement de Paris). In 2023, it had a population of 83,873.

The arrondissement, called Entrepôt (warehouse), is situated on the right bank of the River Seine. It contains two of the seven large mainline railway stations of Paris: the Gare du Nord and the Gare de l'Est. Built during the 19th century, these two termini are among the busiest in Europe. The 10th arrondissement also contains a large portion of the Canal Saint-Martin, linking the northeastern parts of Paris with the Seine.

The current mayor of the 10th arrondissement, since 2017, is Alexandra Cordebard.

== Geography ==
The quarters of the 10th arrondissement

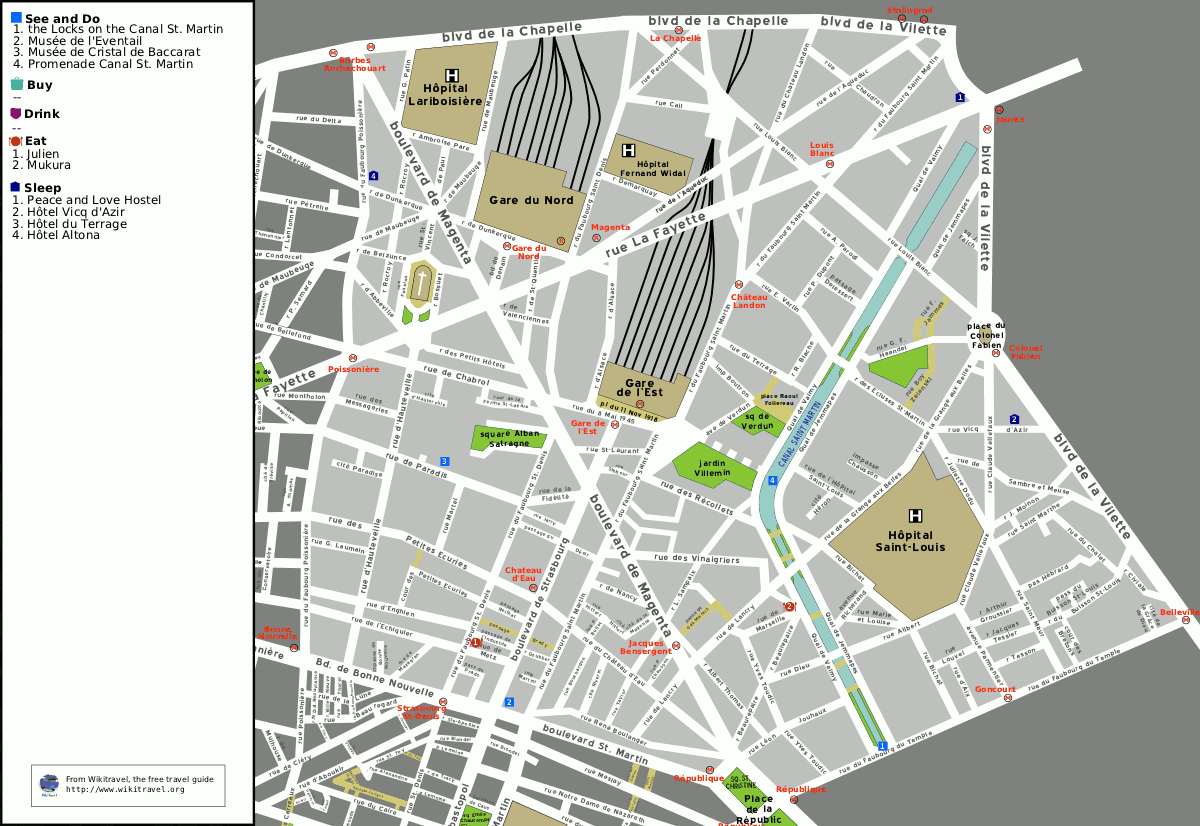
Map of the 10th arrondissement

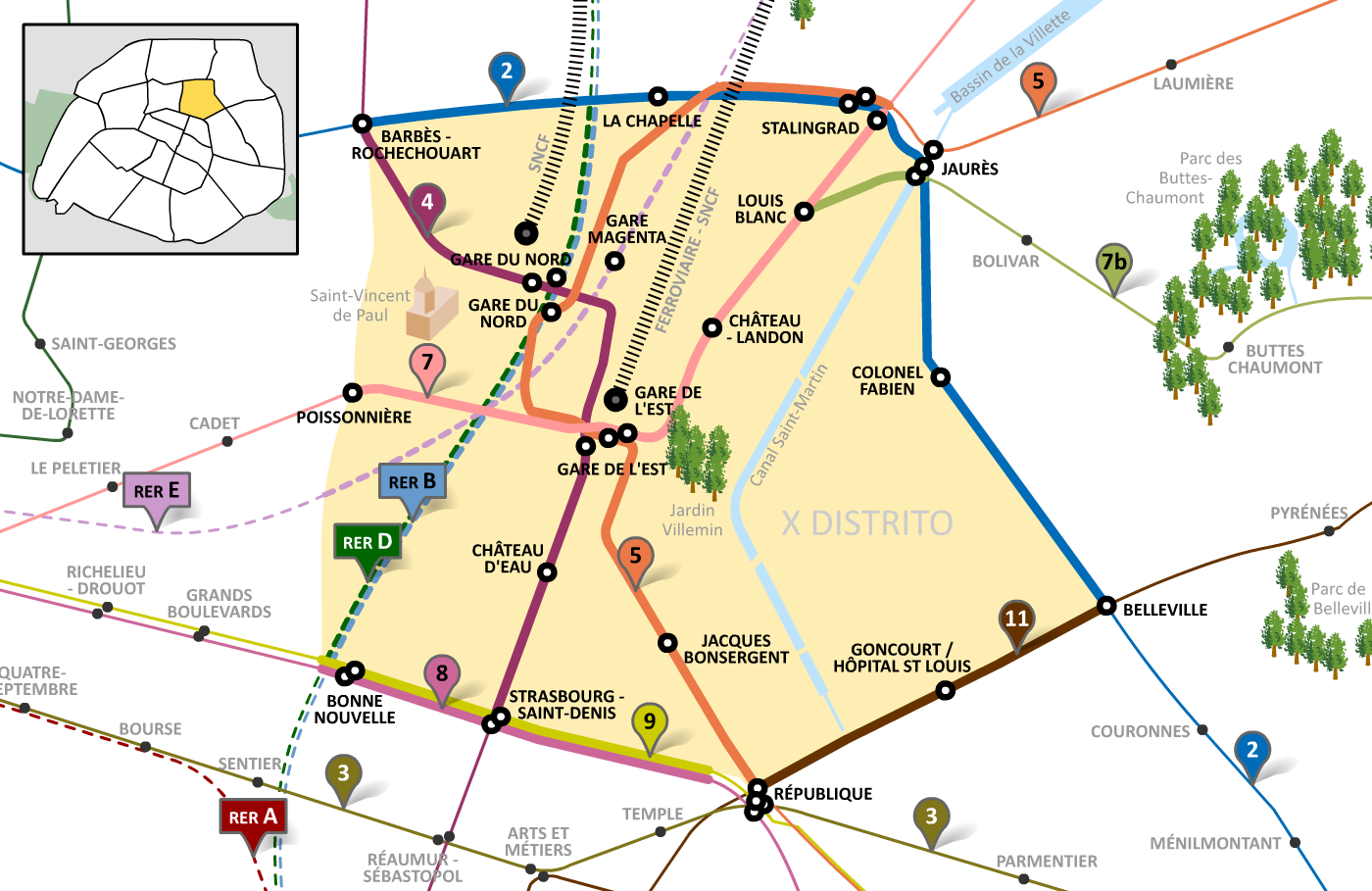

The land area of the arrondissement is 2.892 km^{2} (1.117 sq mi; 715 acres).

The 10th arrondissement is often referred to as l'Entrepôt. Like all Parisian arrondissements, it is divided into four quartiers (districts):

- Saint-Vincent-de-Paul, the 37th quartier, has 21,624 people in an area of 92.7 hectares (229 acres)
- Porte-Saint-Denis, the 38th quartier, has 15,066 people in an area of 47.2 hectares (117 acres)
- Porte-Saint-Martin, the 39th quartier, has 23,125 people in an area of 60.9 hectares (150 acres)
- Hôpital-Saint-Louis, the 40th quartier, has 29,870 people in an area of 88.4 hectares (218 acres)

== Demographics ==
The peak population of the 10th arrondissement occurred in 1881, when it had 162,671 inhabitants. Today, the arrondissement remains very dense in both population and business activity, with 71,962 jobs in the census of 1999. Due to its large Turkish minority, the 10th arrondissement is often called "La Petite Turquie" (Little Turkey).

=== Historical population ===
Historical population

Year	Pop.	±% p.a.
1861	113,571	—
1872	135,392	+1.61%
1881	162,671	+2.06%
1891	155,344	−0.46%
1901	154,852	−0.03%
1911	151,161	−0.24%
1921	145,722	−0.37%
1931	131,150	−1.05%
1936	125,374	−0.90%
1946	123,939	−0.12%
1954	129,179	+0.52%

Year	Pop.	±% p.a.
1962	124,497	−0.46%
1968	113,372	−1.55%
1975	94,046	−2.63%
1982	86,970	−1.11%
1990	90,083	+0.44%
1999	89,612	−0.06%
2007	93,373	+0.52%
2012	94,474	+0.23%
2017	90,372	−0.88%
2023	83,873	−1.24%

Source: Demographia (1861-1999) and INSEE (1876-2023)

=== Immigration ===
Place of birth of residents of the 10th arrondissement in 1999
Born in metropolitan France	Born outside metropolitan France			
70.4%	29.6%			
70.4%	Born in overseas France	Born in foreign countries with French citizenship at birth^{1}	EU-15 immigrants^{2}	Non-EU-15 immigrants
70.4%	1.3%	4.1%	4.4%	19.8%
^{1} This group is made up largely of former French settlers, such as pieds-noirs in Northwest Africa, followed by former colonial citizens who had French citizenship at birth (such as was often the case for the native elite in French colonies), as well as to a lesser extent foreign-born children of French expatriates. A foreign country is understood as a country not part of France in 1999, so a person born for example in 1950 in Algeria, when Algeria was an integral part of France, is nonetheless listed as a person born in a foreign country in French statistics.^{2} An immigrant is a person born in a foreign country not having French citizenship at birth. An immigrant may have acquired French citizenship since moving to France, but is still considered an immigrant in French statistics. On the other hand, persons born in France with foreign citizenship (the children of immigrants) are not listed as immigrants.

== Cityscape ==
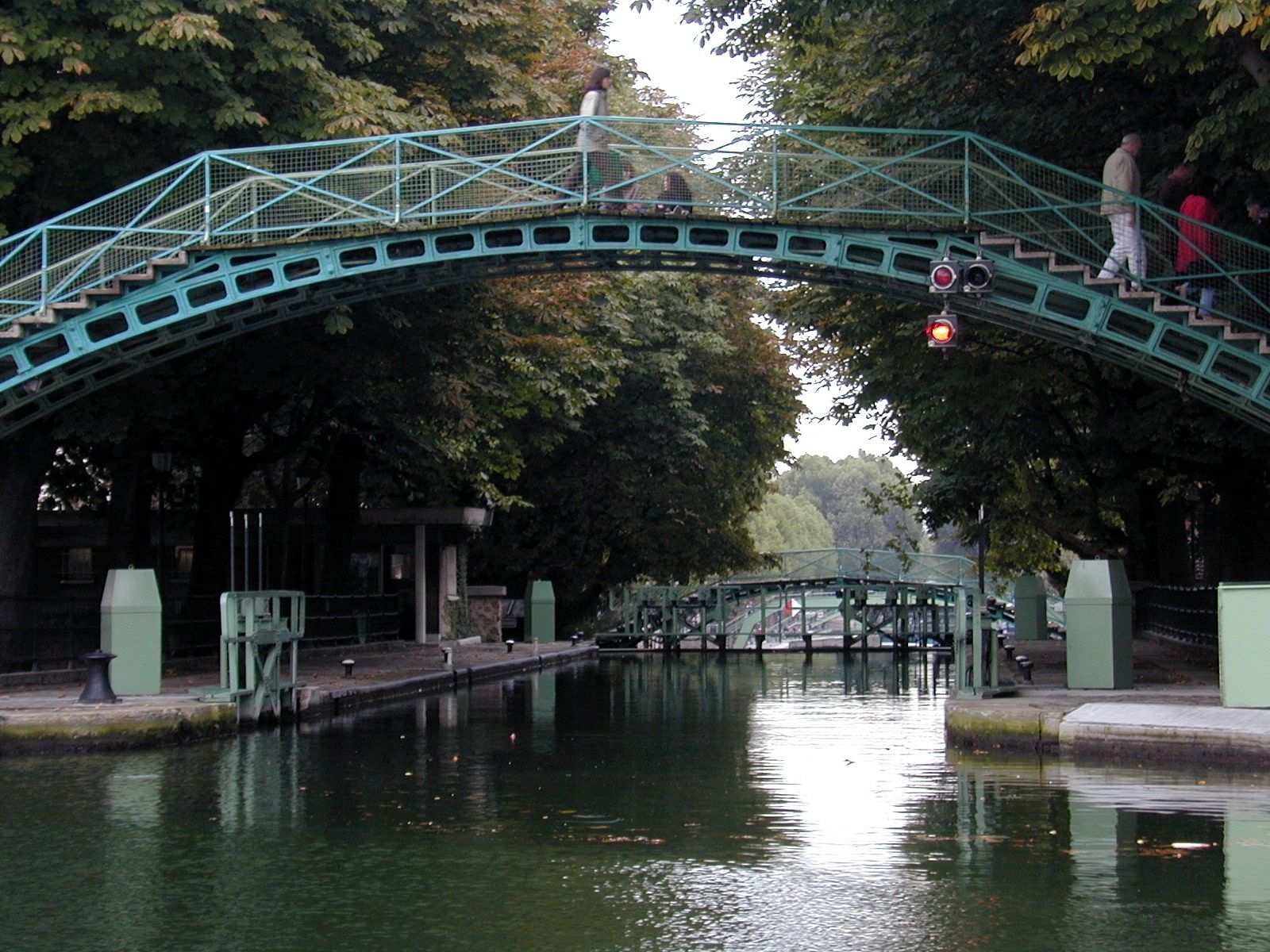
The canal Saint-Martin

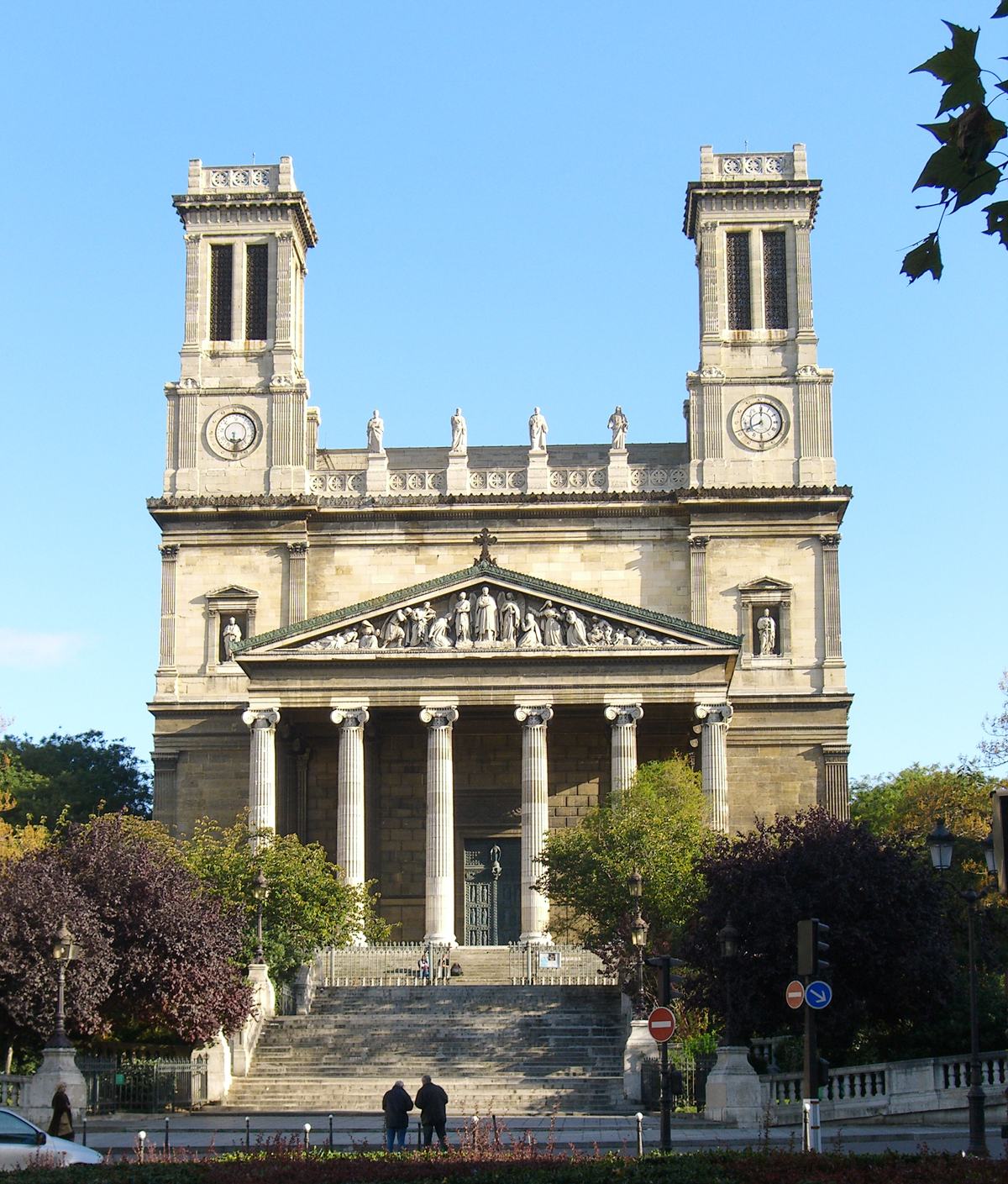
Saint-Vincent-de-Paul

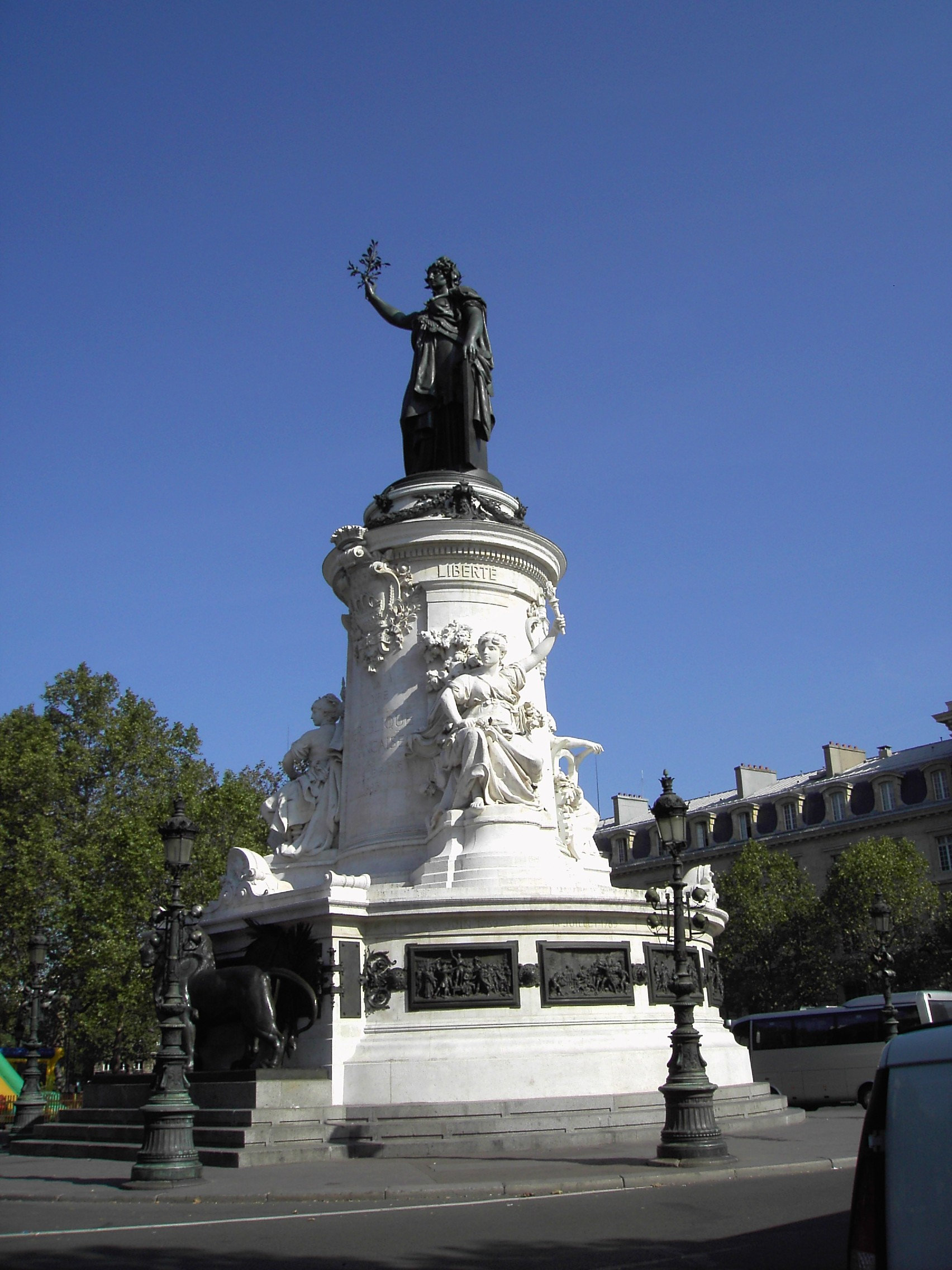
Place de la République

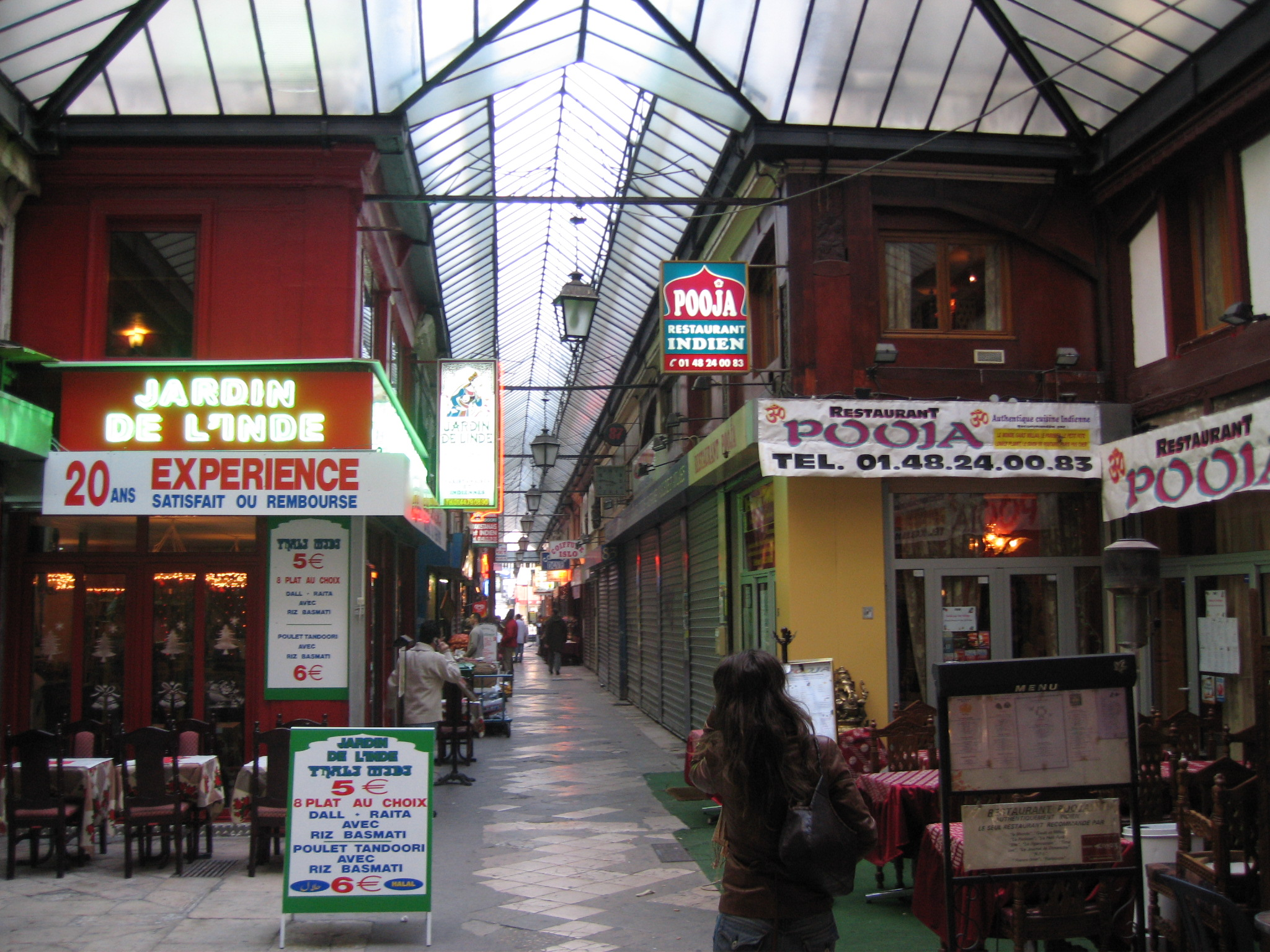
Passage Brady

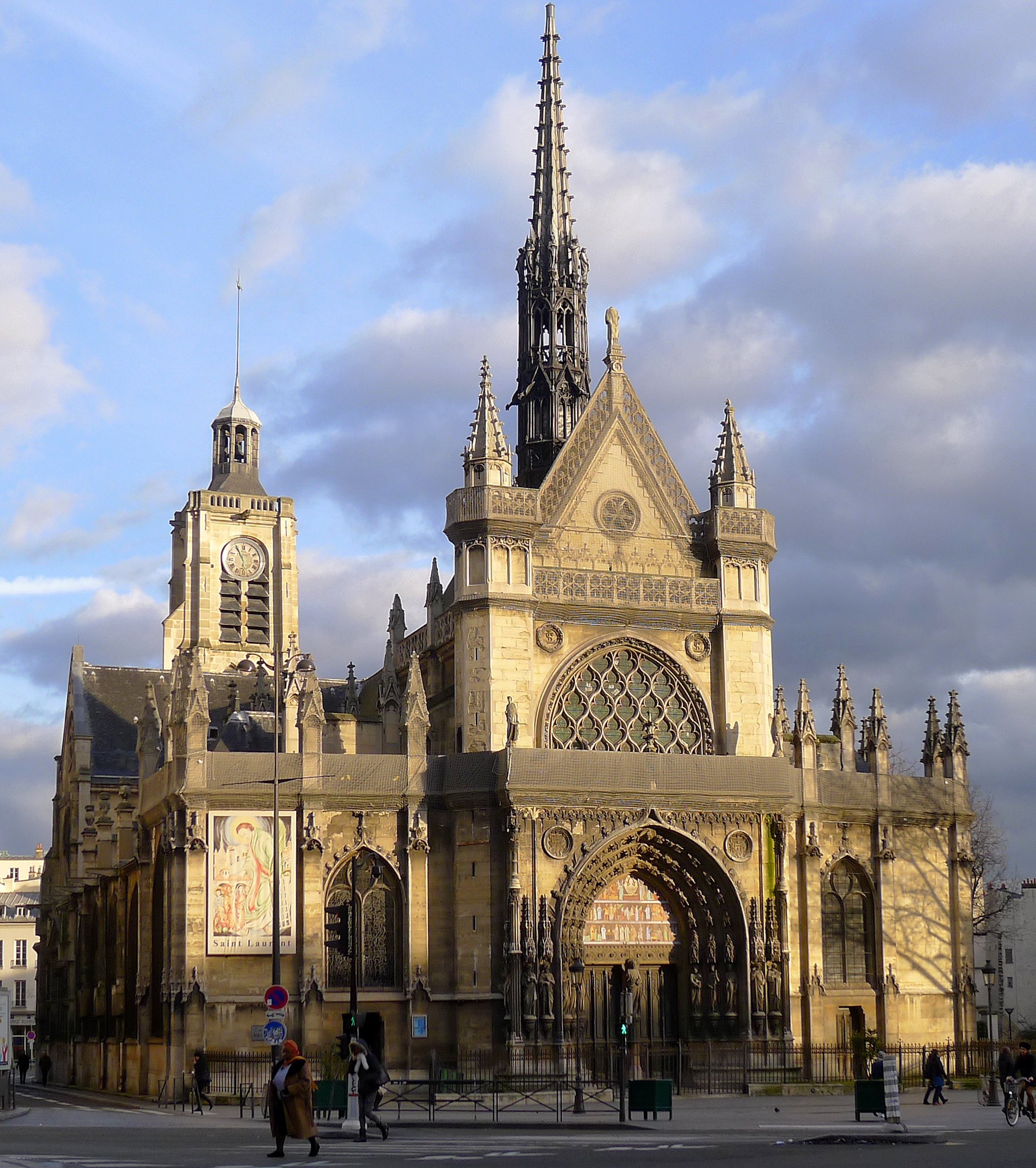
Saint-Laurent, Paris

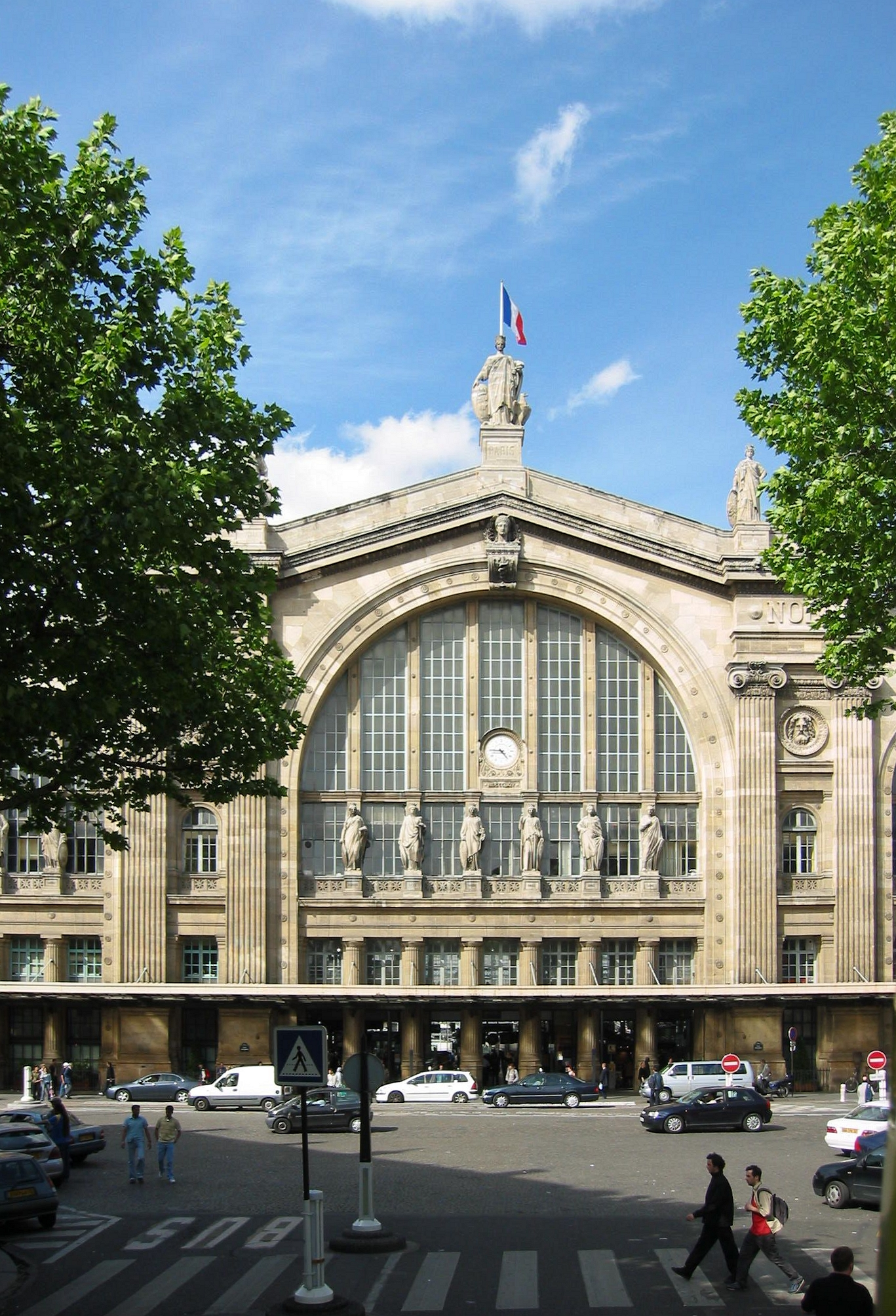
Gare du Nord
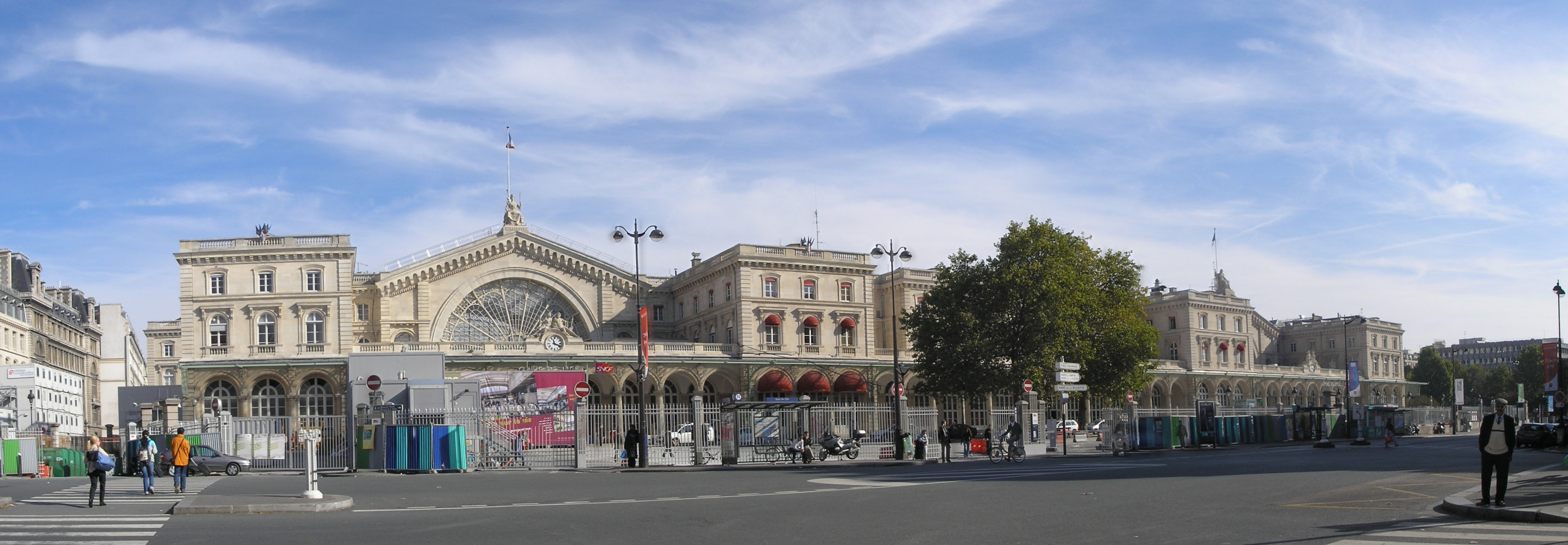
Gare de l'Est

=== Places of interest ===
- Canal Saint-Martin
- Gare de l'Est
- Gare du Nord
- Musée de l'Éventail (museum of fans)
- Passage Brady
- Passage du Prado
- Porte Saint-Denis
- Porte Saint-Martin
- Saint-Martin-des-Champs, Paris
- Saint-Joseph-Artisan, Paris
- Church of Saint-Vincent-de-Paul, Paris
- Church of Saint-Laurent, Paris
- Théâtre Antoine-Simone Berriau
- Chapel of Lariboisiere Hospital, Paris
- The House of African Worlds, or MansA

=== Main streets and squares ===
==== Streets ====
- Rue d'Abbeville
- Rue Albert-Thomas
- Rue Alibert
- Rue d'Alsace
- Rue Ambroise-Paré
- Rue de l'Aqueduc
- Rue Beaurepaire
- Rue de Belzunce
- Rue Bichat
- Boulevard de Bonne-Nouvelle
- Impasse Bonne-Nouvelle
- Rue Bossuet
- Rue Bouchardon
- Passage Brady
- Passage du Buisson-Saint-Louis
- Rue du Buisson-Saint-Louis
- Rue Cail
- Rue de Chabrol
- Rue du Chalet
- Boulevard de la Chapelle
- Rue Charles-Robin
- Rue du Château-d'Eau
- Rue du Château-Landon
- Avenue Claude-Vellefaux
- Rue de Compiègne
- Rue Demarquay
- Boulevard de Denain
- Rue de Dunkerque
- Rue Eugène-Varlin
- Rue du Faubourg-du-Temple
- Rue du Faubourg-Poissonnière
- Rue du Faubourg-Saint-Denis
- Rue du Faubourg-Saint-Martin
- Rue Fénelon
- Rue de la Fidélité
- Rue de la Grange-aux-Belles
- Rue Guy-Patin
- Rue d'Hauteville
- Rue du Huit-Mai-1945
- Rue de l'Hôpital-Saint-Louis
- Rue Jacques-Louvel-Tessier
- Rue Jean-Moinon
- Rue Jean-Poulmarch
- Quai de Jemmapes
- Rue Juliette-Dodu
- Rue La Fayette
- Rue de Lancry
- Rue Léon-Jouhaux
- Rue Louis-Blanc
- Rue Lucien-Sampaix
- Boulevard de Magenta
- Rue de Marseille
- Rue Martel
- Rue de Maubeuge
- Rue de Mazagran
- Rue des Messageries
- Rue de Metz
- Rue Monseigneur-Rodhain
- Rue de Nancy
- Rue de Paradis
- Avenue Parmentier
- Rue Perdonnet
- Rue des Petites-Écuries
- Rue des Petits-Hôtels
- Rue Philippe-de-Girard
- Rue des Récollets
- Rue René-Boulanger
- Avenue Richerand
- Rue Robert-Blache
- Rue de Rocroy
- Boulevard Saint-Denis
- Impasse Sainte-Marthe
- Rue Sainte-Marthe
- Rue Saint-Laurent
- Boulevard Saint-Martin
- Rue Saint-Maur
- Rue de Saint-Quentin
- Rue Saint-Vincent-de-Paul
- Rue de Sambre-et-Meuse
- Rue Sibour
- Boulevard de Strasbourg
- Rue du Terrage
- Rue Tesson
- Rue Taylor
- Quai de Valmy
- Avenue de Verdun
- Rue Vicq-D'Azir
- Boulevard de la Villette
- Rue des Vinaigriers
- Rue Yves-Toudic

==== Squares ====
- Place de la Bataille-de-Stalingrad
- Place du Colonel-Fabien
- Place du Docteur-Alfred-Fournier
- Place Franz-Liszt
- Place Napoléon-III
- Place de la République
- Place de Roubaix
- Place Sainte-Marthe
- Place de Valenciennes
- Square Alban-Satragne
- Square Amadou-Hampate Ba
- Square Aristide-Cavaillé-Col
- Square des Recollets
- Square Eugène-Varlin
- Square Frédérick-Lemaître
- Square Henri-Christiné
- Square Juliette-Dodu
- Square Raoul-Follereau
- Square Robert-Blache
- Square Saint-Laurent
