= Saint-Joseph-Artisan, Paris =

Church in Paris, France

Coordinates: 48°52′53″N 2°22′04″E

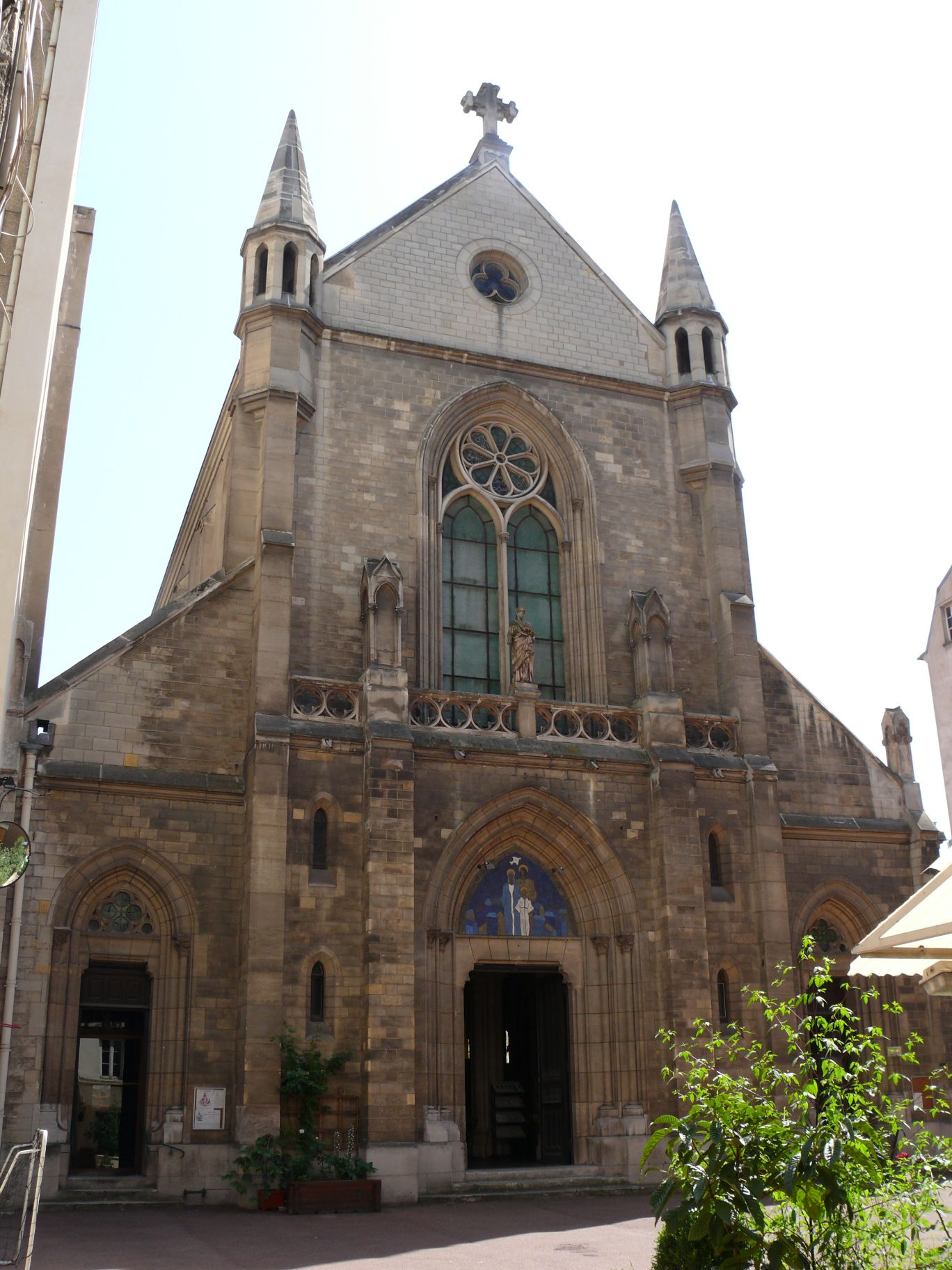
- Saint-Joseph-Artisan, Paris

Religion
- Affiliation: Catholic Church
- Province: Archdiocese of Paris
- Rite: Roman Rite

Location
- Location: in the 10th arrondissement of Paris
- Interactive map of Saint-Joseph-Artisan, Paris

Architecture
- Style: Neo-Gothic
- Groundbreaking: 1865
- Completed: 1866

Saint Joseph Artisan is a Roman Catholic Church located at 214 rue LaFayette in the 10th arrondissement of Paris. It was built in 1865–1866 by the architect Lucien Douillard in the style of Neogothic architecture. His other major work included the church of Saint-Andrei de l'Europe in the 8th arrondissement.

== History ==
The church was constructed originally for the German-speaking workers who came to Paris in large numbers in the second part of the 19th century to work in the city's factories and workshops. An earlier chapel had been opened by he Jesuits for the German-speakers in 1850. The present church was begun in 1885, with substantial offerings from German and Austrian patrons.The furnishings were provided by the Prince of Saxony. It was initially called the church of "Saint Joseph of the Germans."

In 1870, with the Franco-German War, the Germans largely left the parish and were replaced by French immigrants from Alsace. In 1871, the church was damaged by cannon fire during the Paris Commune. New church furnishings were provided by the Archbishop of Paris, In 1901, the existence of the church was again threatened, but the Austrian government intervened to keep it open. In 1903 the Mission was again taken over by the French state, but in 1910 Prince Max of Saxony intervened and bought the contents of the church.

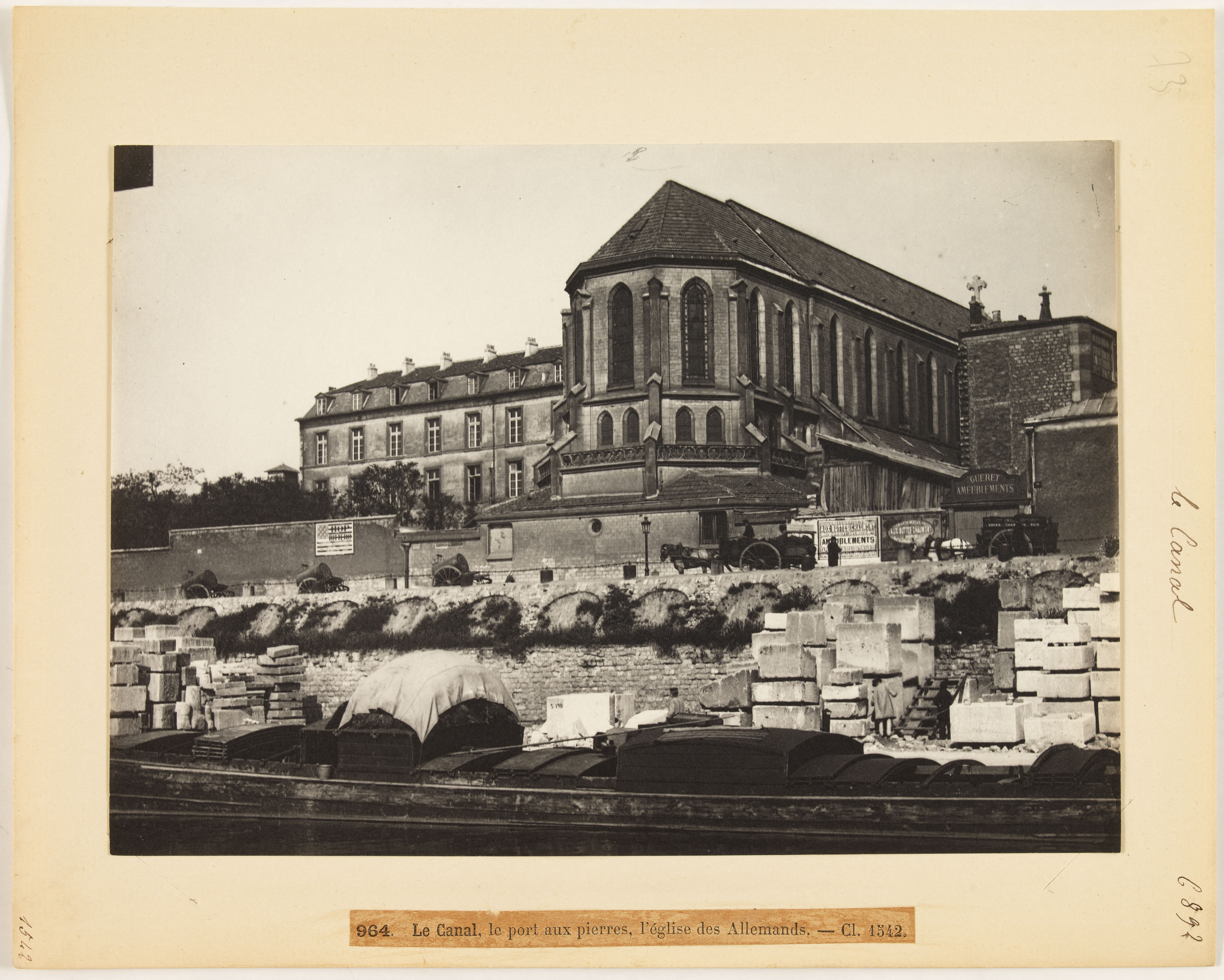
The "German Church" in about 1900, seen from the canal

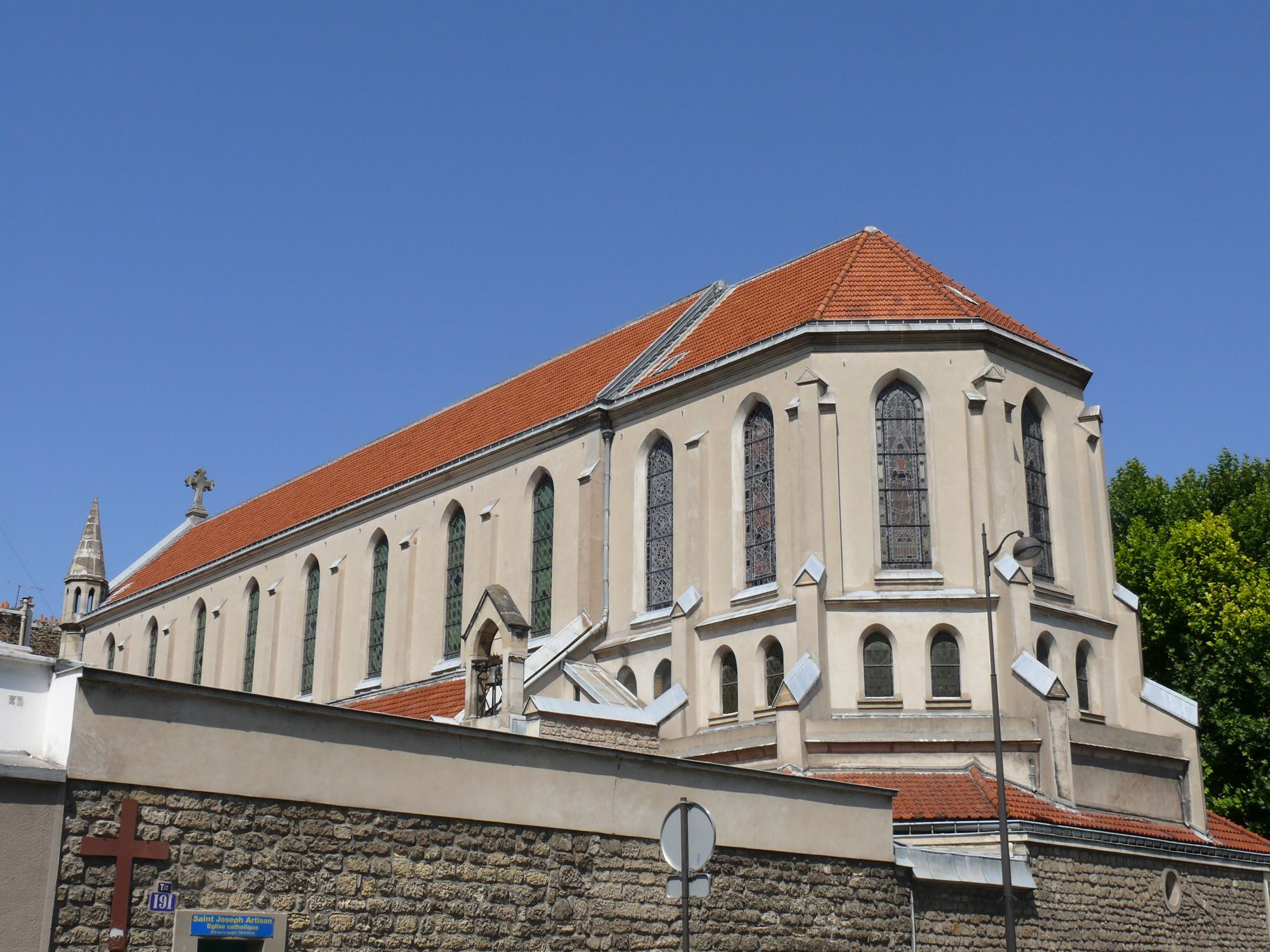
The nave and apse now

In 1914, with the outbreak of the First World War, the property of the church was seized by the French state. It remained open, though now the congregation was French, not German. In 1918, a shell from a German long-range "Big Bertha" cannon landed in the church courtyard, and was lodged just behind the present statue of Saint Joseph, but happily did not explode.

Following the war, as there were few Germans left in the parish, the church was designated to serve a congregation of parishioners from Luxembourg and other German speakers from outside Germany. In 1958 The building and its contents were formally transferred to the Archbishop of Paris, but, unlike other churches in Paris, it did not become the property of the French State.

== The Church ==
The present building dates to 1865. The facade is largely hidden by other buildings, and only the apse, over the canal, is clearly visible. It is not large (46 meters in length) and has a very sober interior, the walls are not plastered, making the stones of the wall visible.

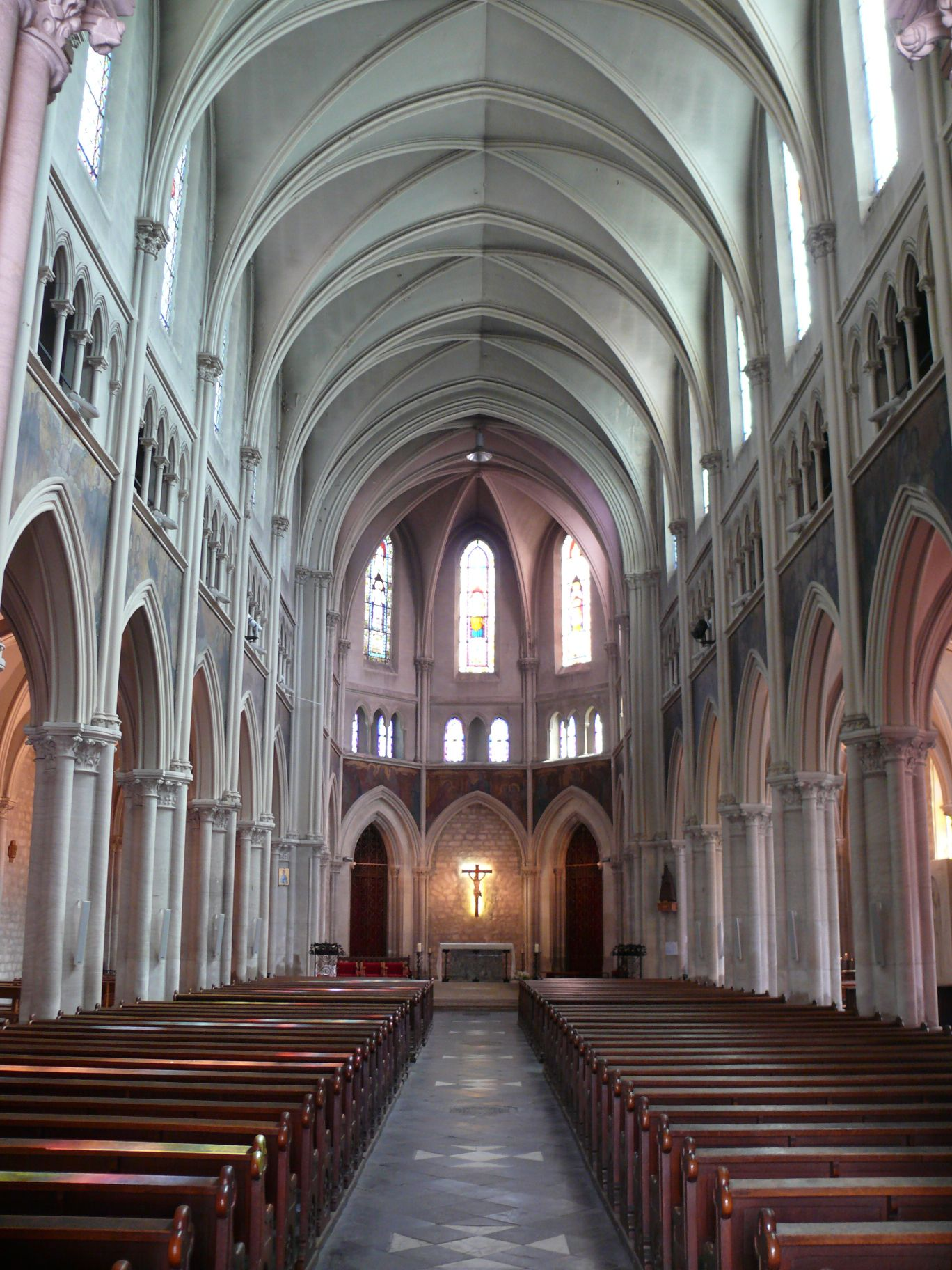
The nave facing the choir

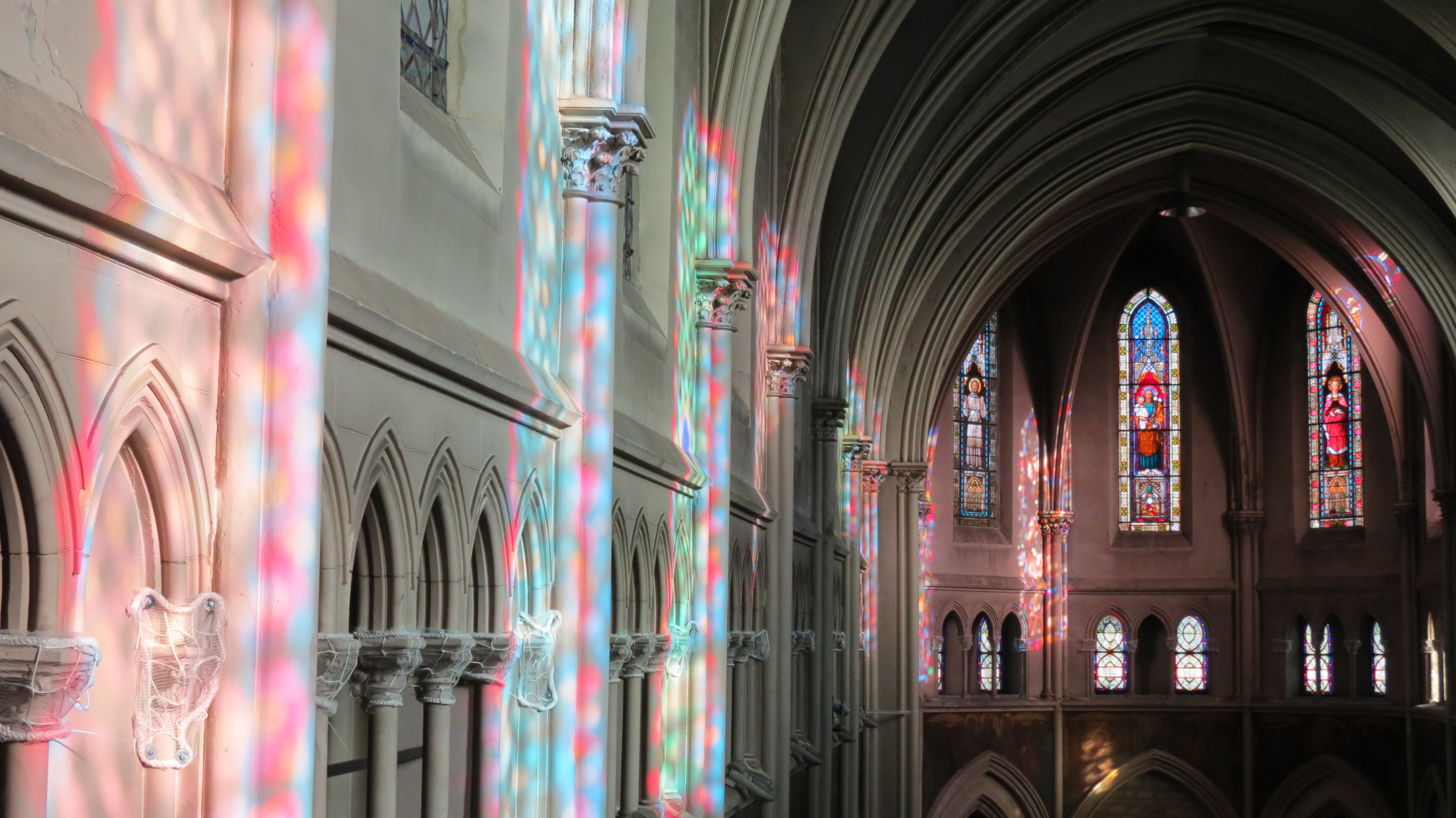
Stained glass brightens the choir

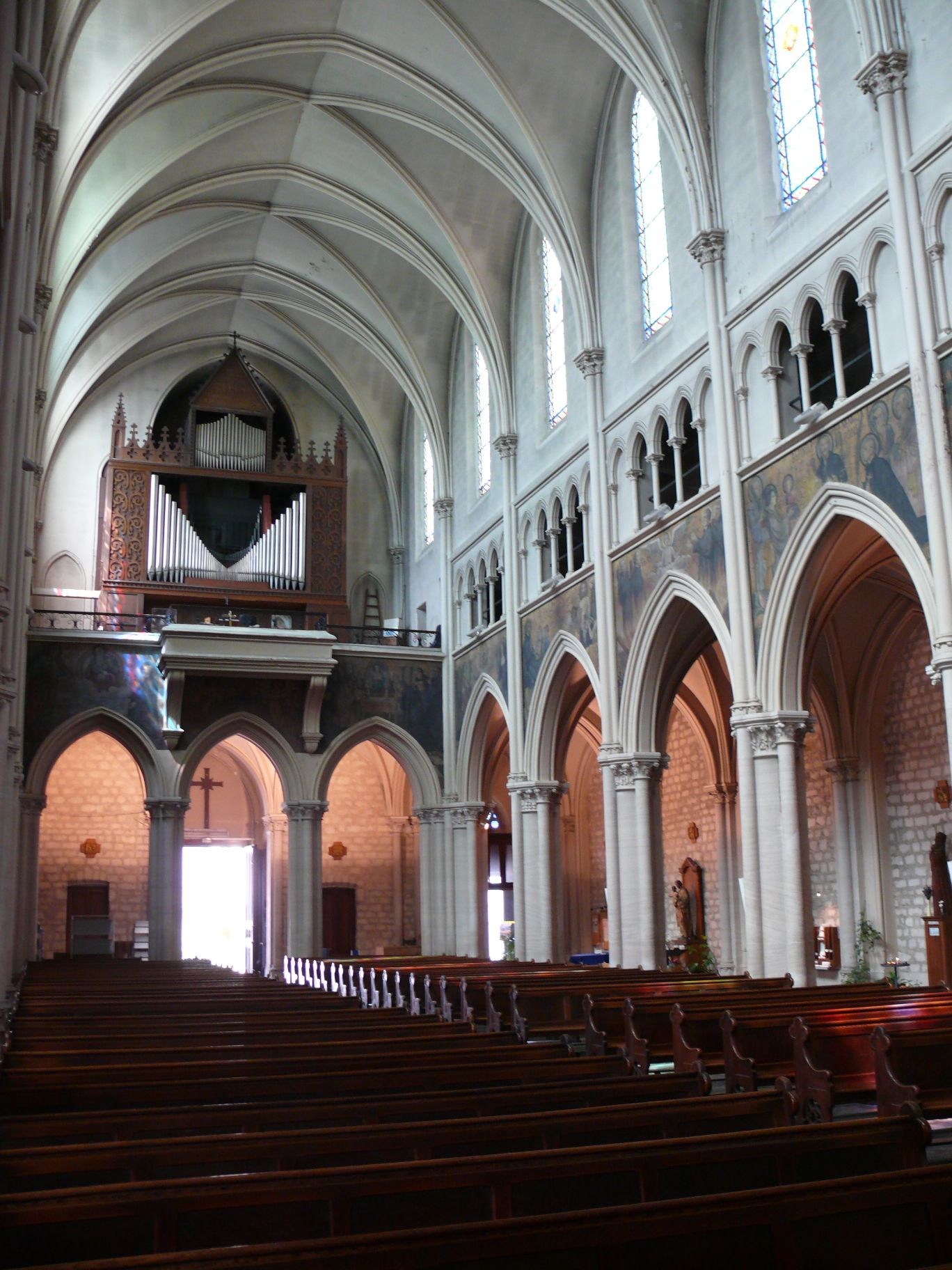
The nave and the organ in the tribune

== Stained glass ==
The color of the interior comes largely from the abundant stained glass. Many of the upper windows have geometric designs, allowing in more light. The three principal windows in the choir were gifts to the church from Emperor Franz Joseph I of Austria during his visit to Paris in 1867. They depict the patron saints of the Emperor; Saint Francis and Saint Joseph on the left and right, and, in the center, Saint Elizabeth of Hungary, the patron saint of the Empress Elisabeth of Austria, known as "Sissi"

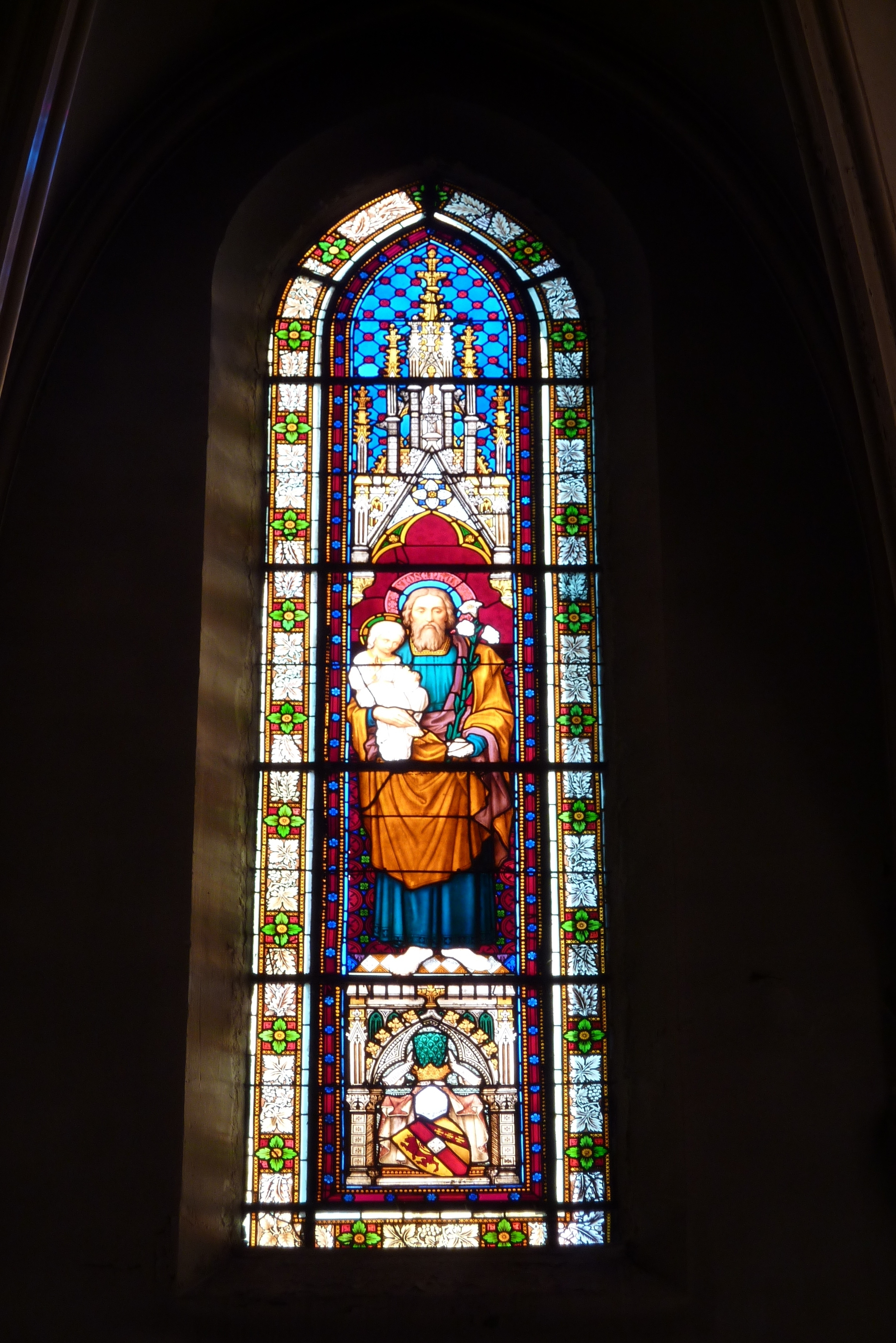
A gift from the Emperor, "Saint Joseph"

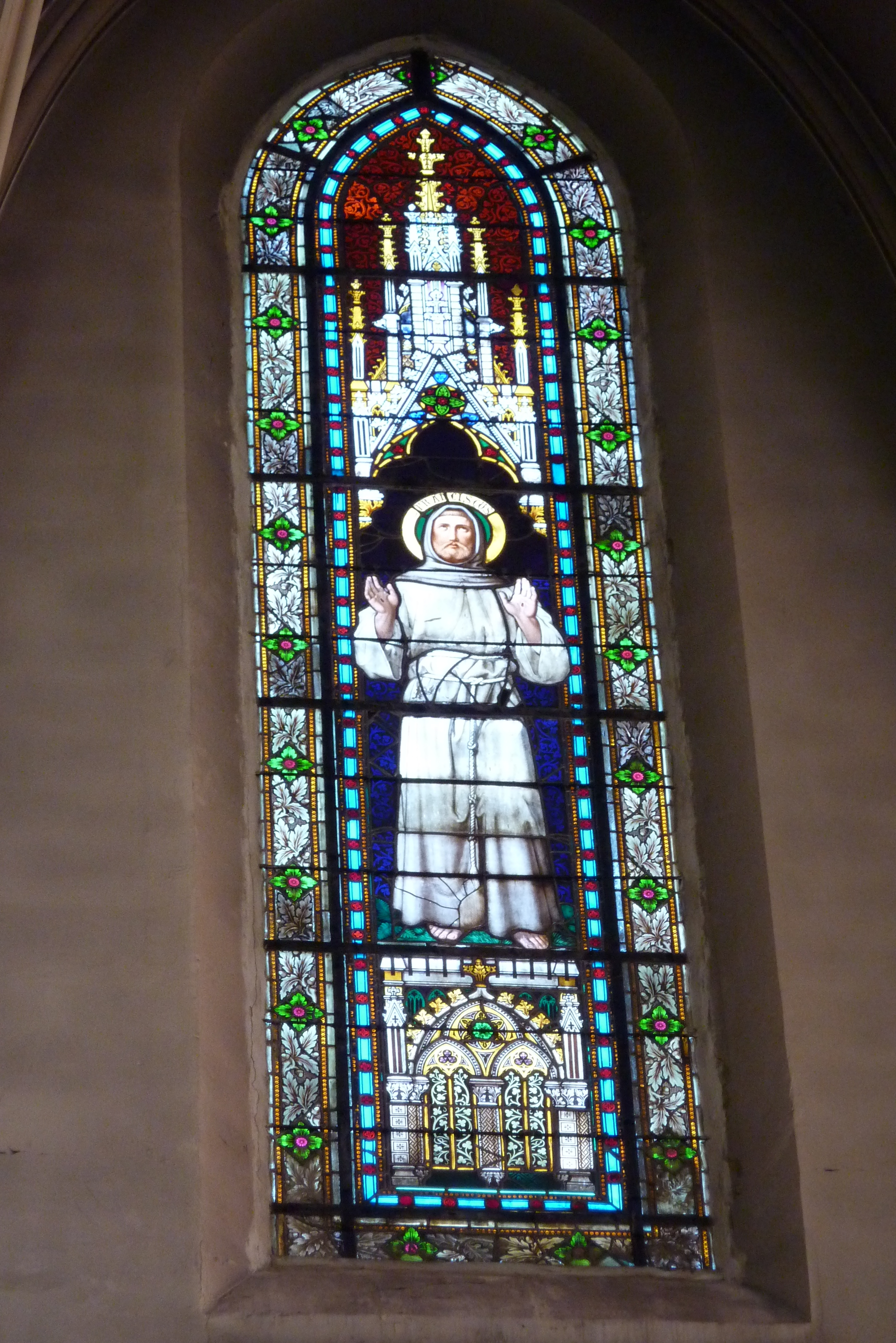
"St. Francis of Assisi"

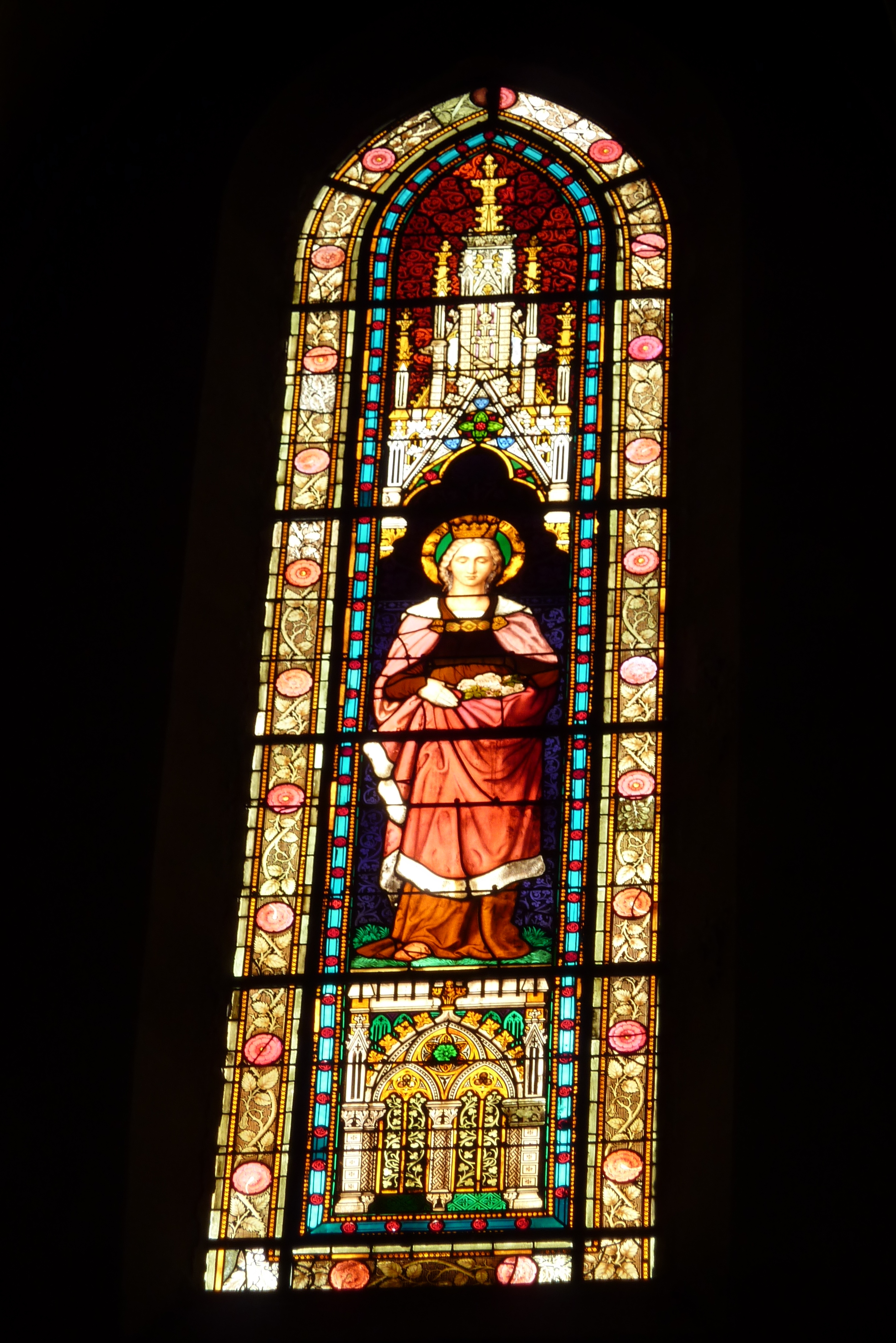
The Empress Elizabeth

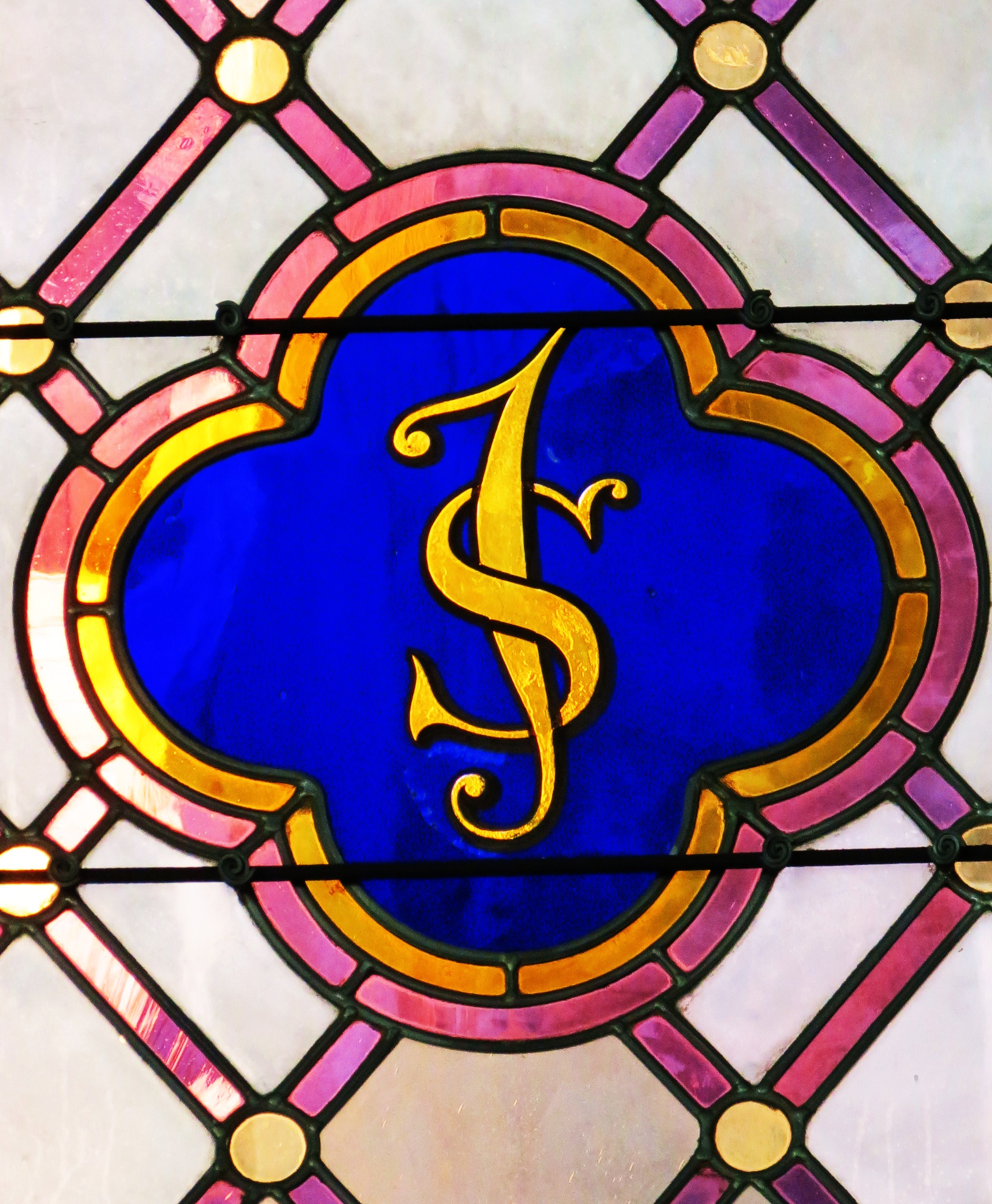
SJ, or Saint Joseph, design

== The organ ==
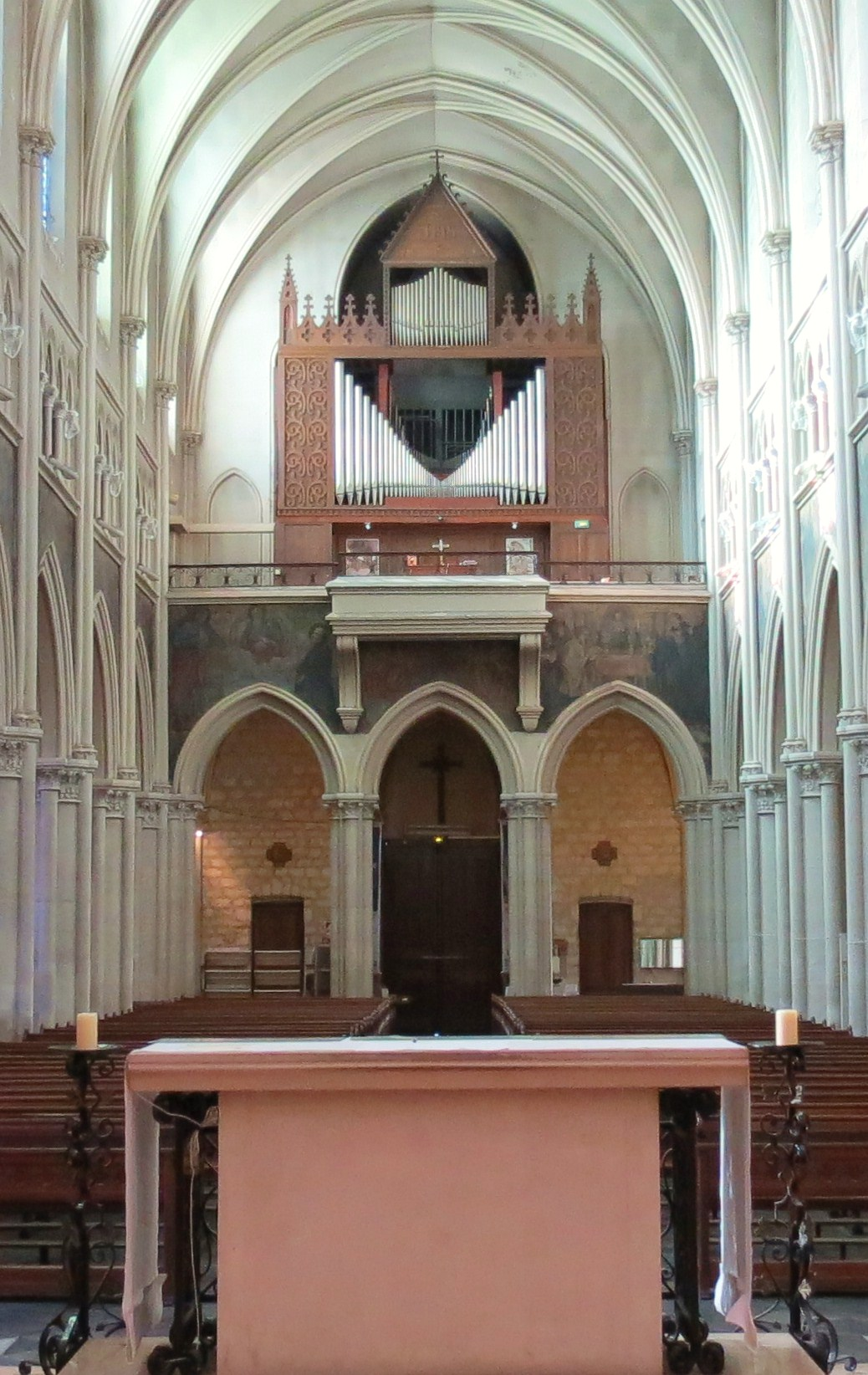
The altar and the organ

The present organ has been in the church since its construction, It was modified and updated in 1966 by Danion-Martinez. The instrument has two keyboards with fifty-six notes and thirty pedals. uses electric transmissions, and has twenty-six jeux or effects.

In the 19th century, the organist of the church was Georges Schmitt (1821-1900, a student of Hector Berlioz and the teacher of Cesar Franck. He previously had served as organist the Church of Saint-Germain-des-Pres and Saint-Sulpice, but decided to join his German compatriots at Saint-Joseph Artisan.
