= Passage Brady =

Thoroughfare in Paris, France

Coordinates: 48°52′16.05″N 02°21′19″E

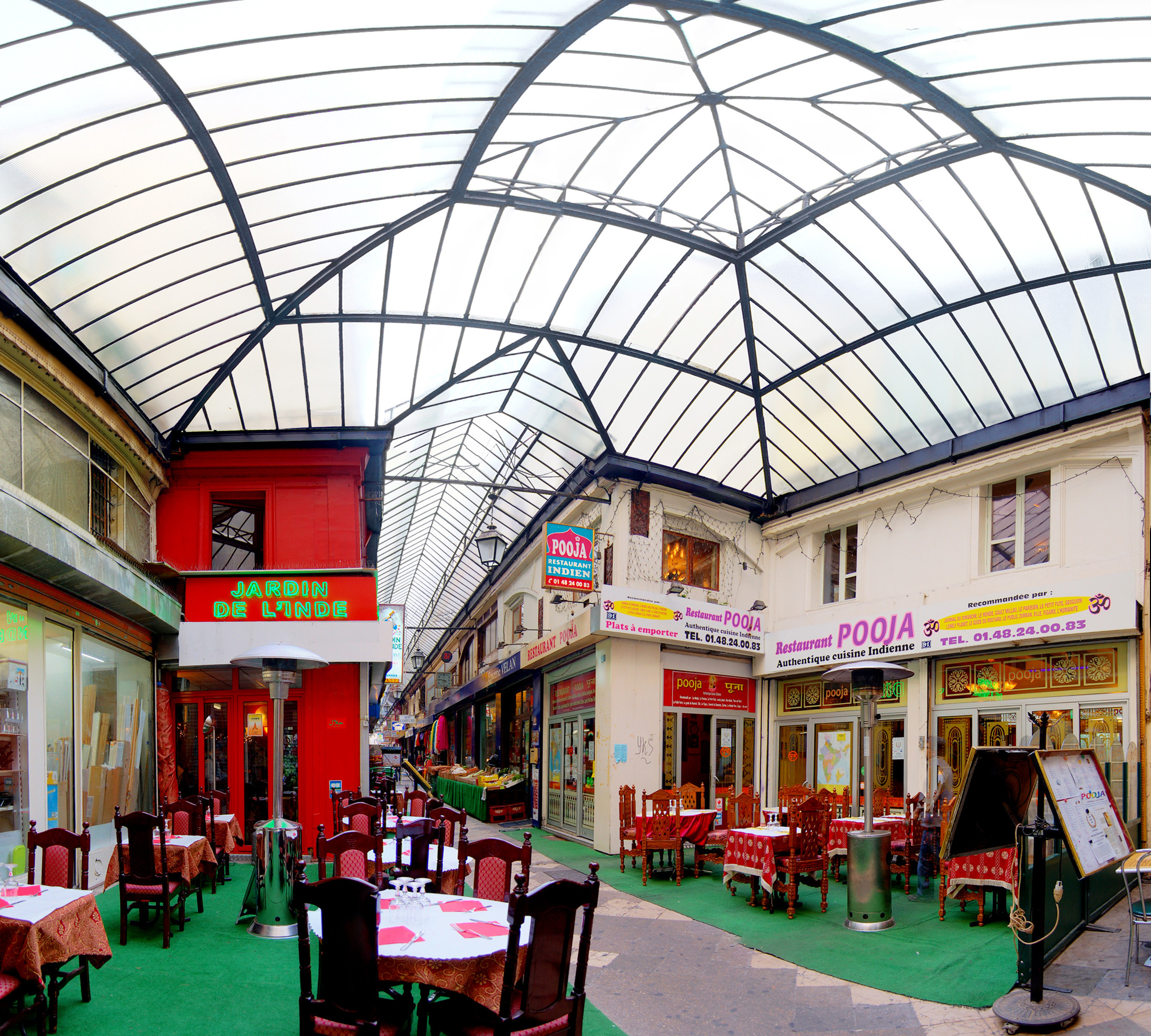
- Passage Brady
- Interactive map of Passage Brady
- Length: 216 m
- Width: 3.5 m
- Location: 10th arrondissement of Paris, Paris, France

The Passage Brady is one of two iron-and-glass covered arcades (known in French as the Passages couverts de Paris) located in the 10th arrondissement of Paris, France. Constructed in 1828, it lies between the Rue du Faubourg-Saint-Denis and the Rue du Faubourg-Saint-Martin.

It is famous for the several Indian, Pakistani and Bangladeshi restaurants located in the arcade.
