= Rue d'Abbeville =

Street in Paris, France

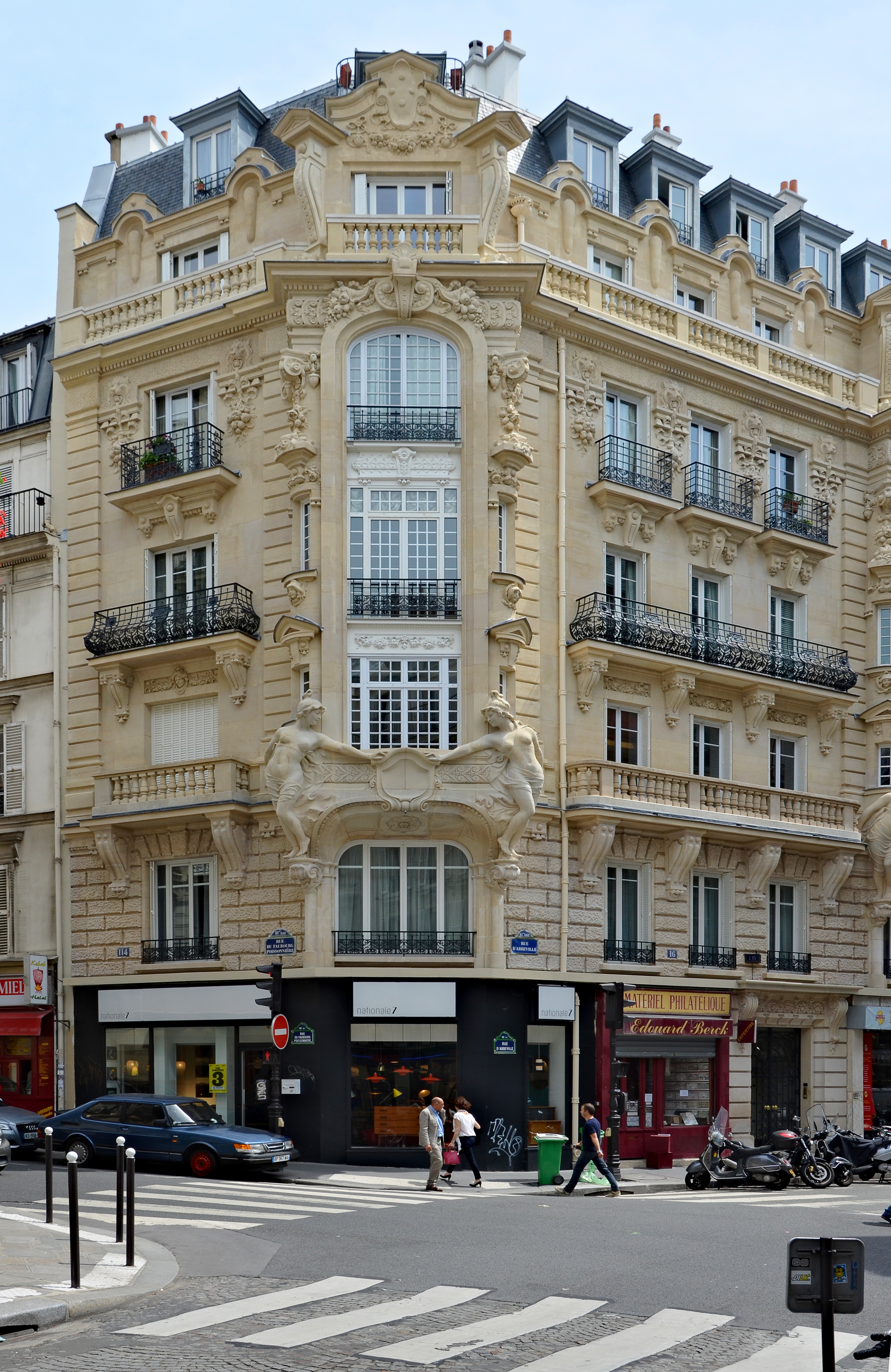
- 16 Rue d'Abbeville, a residential building in the Art Nouveau style

- Location within Paris
- Length: 220 m (720 ft)
- Width: 15.75 m (51.7 ft)
- Arrondissement: 9th, 10th
- Quarter: Rochechouart; Saint-Vincent de Paul
- Coordinates: 48°52′43″N 2°21′1.5″E
- From: 1, Place Franz-Liszt
- To: 82, Rue de Maubeuge

Construction
- Completion: 1827-1894
- Denomination: 28 December 1894

The Rue d'Abbeville is a street in the 9th and 10th arrondissements of Paris. It derives its name from the proximity of the Gare du Nord railway station that serves the town of Abbeville, in Picardy in the Somme.

The street has two sections:

- The first section, between the Place Franz-Liszt and the Rue de Rocroy, opened because of an ordinance dated 31 January 1827. It was officially named the Route d'Abbeville in 1847.
- The second section, between the Rue de Rocroy and the Rue de Maubeuge was opened because of an ordinance dated 3 August 1861, except for the portion between the Rue de Rocroy and the Rue du Faubourg Poissonnière that opened in 1894.

The street adopted its present name in compliance with a decree of 28 December 1894.

Several buildings on the street are regarded as examplars of Art Nouveau architecture from the Belle Époque.

== Metro stations ==
The Rue d'Abbeville is:

Located near the Metro stations: Gare du Nord and Poissonnière.

It is served by lines 4, 5, and 7.
