= Chapel of Lariboisiere Hospital, Paris =

Coordinates: 48°53′00″N 2°21′11″E

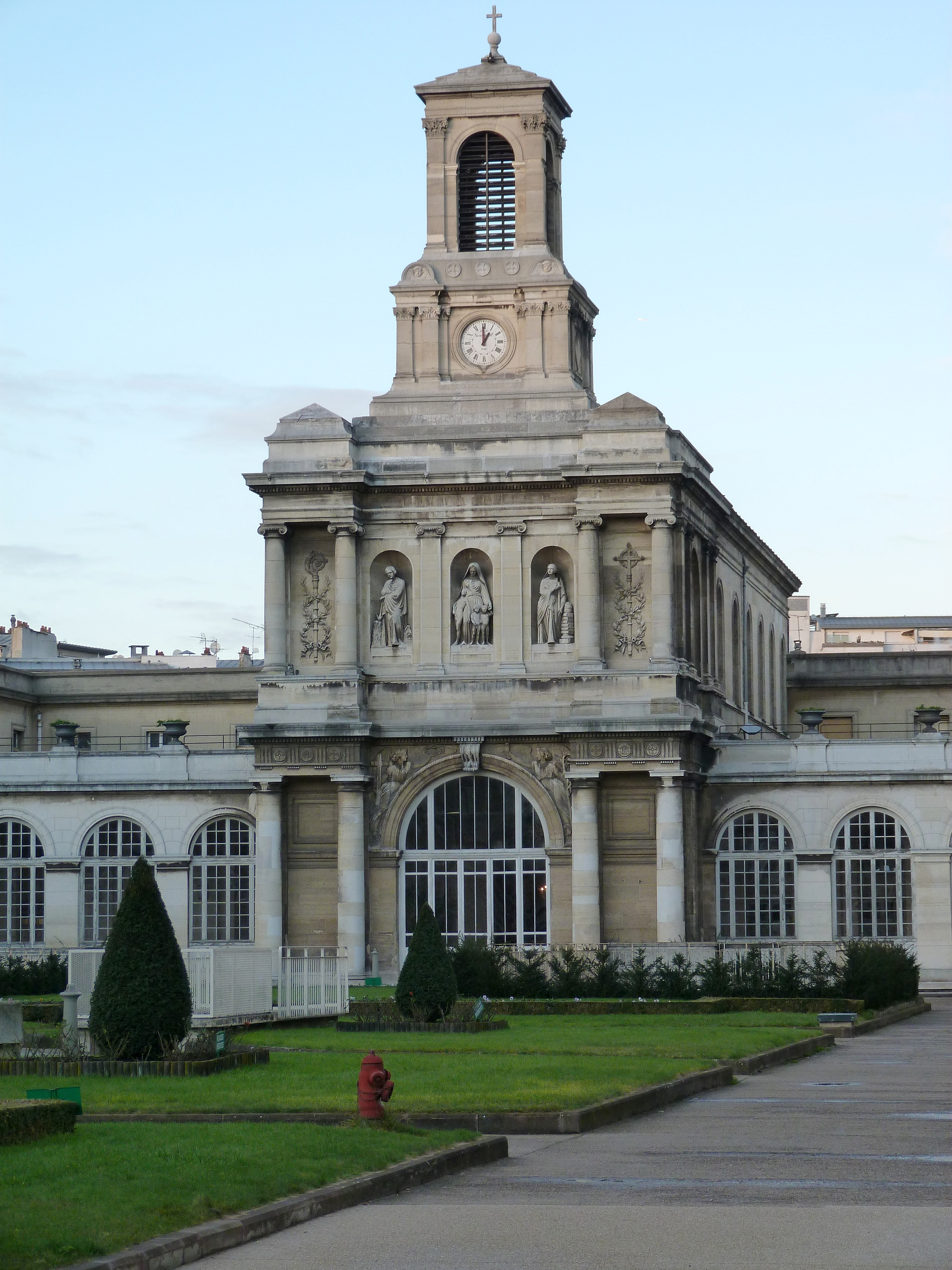
- Chapel of Lariboisiere Hospital

Religion
- Affiliation: Catholic Church
- Province: Archdiocese of Paris
- Rite: Roman Rite

Location
- Location: 10th arrondissement of Paris
- Interactive map of Chapel of Lariboisiere Hospital, Paris

Architecture
- Style: Neo-Romanesque
- Groundbreaking: 1846
- Completed: 1853

The Chapel of Lariboisiere Hospital is a Roman Catholic chapel located at 2 Rue Ambroise-Pare in the 10th arrondissement of Paris. It was built between 1846 and 1853 as the centerpiece of a new hospital built in response to a major cholera epidemic that struck Paris in 1839. It was opened in 1854. The chapel is in the Renaissance Revival architectural style, with lavish interior art and decoration.

== History ==
The church was built as part of new hospital constructed in Paris following a disastrous epidemic of cholera in 1832. At the time of the epidemic, the north quarter of Paris, with a growing population. The site chosen was Saint-Lazare, a former leprosy hospital from the middle ages, which had been turned into a monastery and then into a prison.

A large fundraising campaign was carried out between 1846 and 1853. The largest donor was the Countess de la Riboisiere, the daughter of the Minister of Finance of King Louis XVIII. She died in 1851, and left a legacy which generously funded the new hospital and chapel.

The chapel is dedicated to Saint Landry, Bishop of Paris and founder of the Hotel-Dieu hospital in 651.

The chapel served military personnel during the French Revolution of 1848, the Paris Commune, and the First World War. The church, like the hospital, had various names since its founding; it was the Hospital of the North, the Hospital Louis-Philippe, and the Hospital of the Republic, before finally taking its present name.

== Exterior ==
The chapel is placed in the corner of the hospital site, facing a large court of honor. The tower is designed with different classic]al orders on each level; with Doric architecture features on the ground level, Ionic on the first level above, and the Corinthian order on the bell tower.

The first level is decorated with allegorical statues representing Faith, Hope and Charity. These were made by Julien-Charles Dubois (1806-1891).

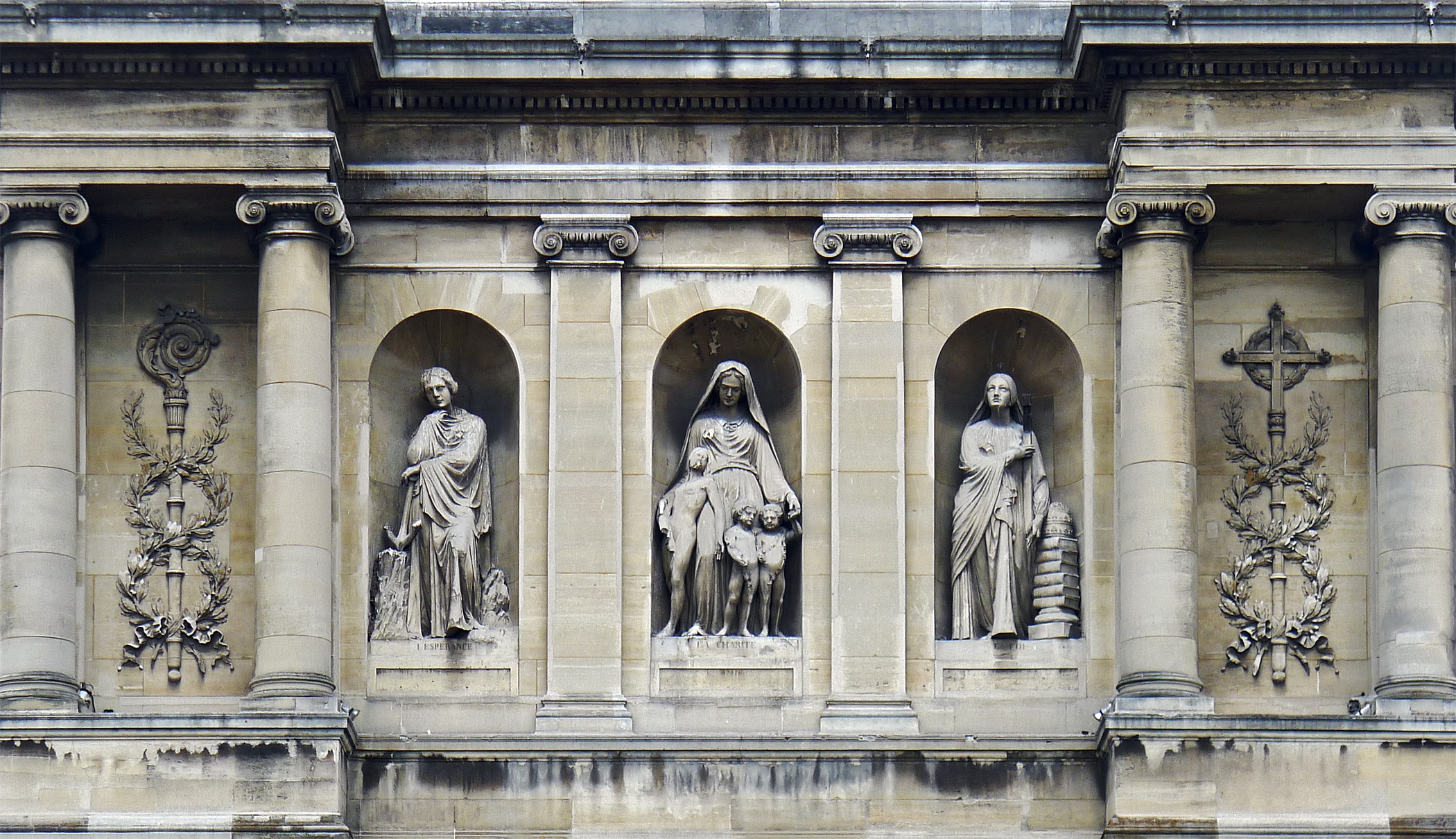
Sculpture on the facade: "Faith", "Hope" and "Charity".

== Interior ==
The interior of the chapel is lavishly decorated with paintings, stained glass, and sculpture. The ceiling is made of compartments embellished in the style of Napoleon III. The columns have Corinthian capitals, and the walls are docrated with carvings and fine woodwork.

The centerpiece is a sculpture commissioned by the Comte de La Riboisiere in the memory of his wife, the Comtesse de La Riboisiere. Called "Charity", It was made of black and white marble by Charles Marochetti (1805-1867) on the design of architect Auguste-Joseph Pellechet. In the center is a Pieta, reaching out to a ill man and an infant. Placed on either side of the Pieta are statues representing "Maternity" and "Old Age". At the top above the sculpture is a bust of the patron.

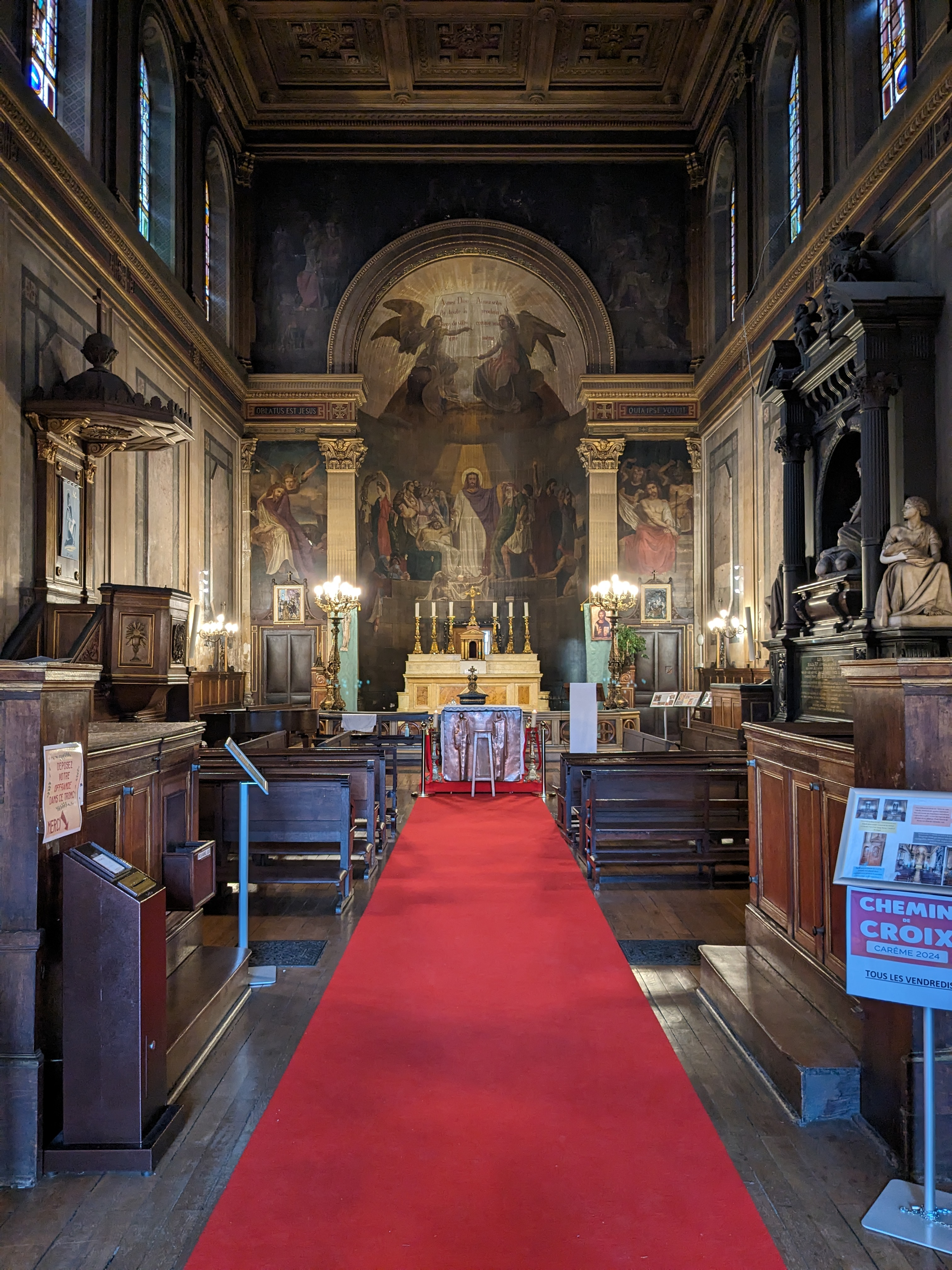
The interior seen from the entrance

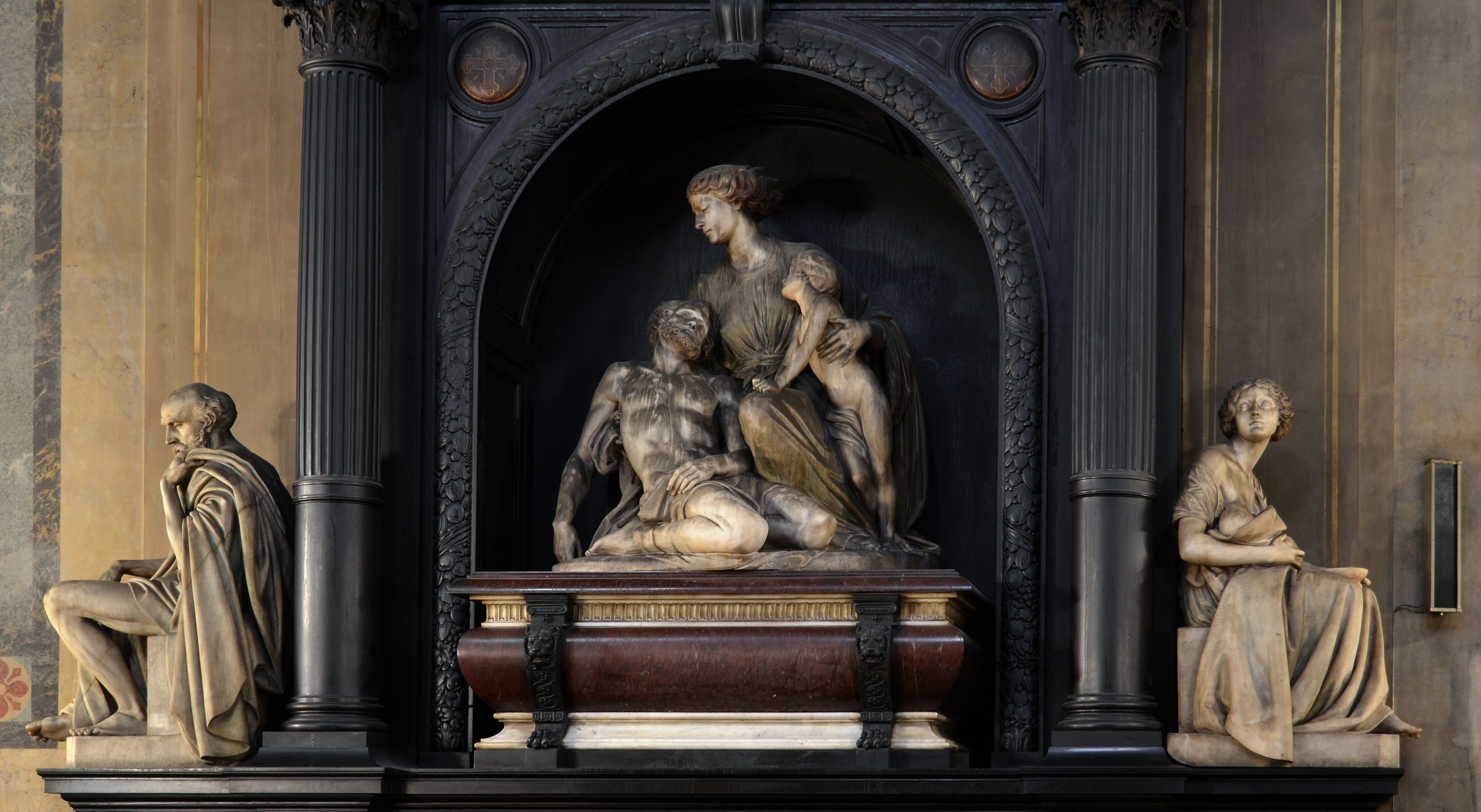
"Charity", the Funeral monument to the Countess de La Riboisiere

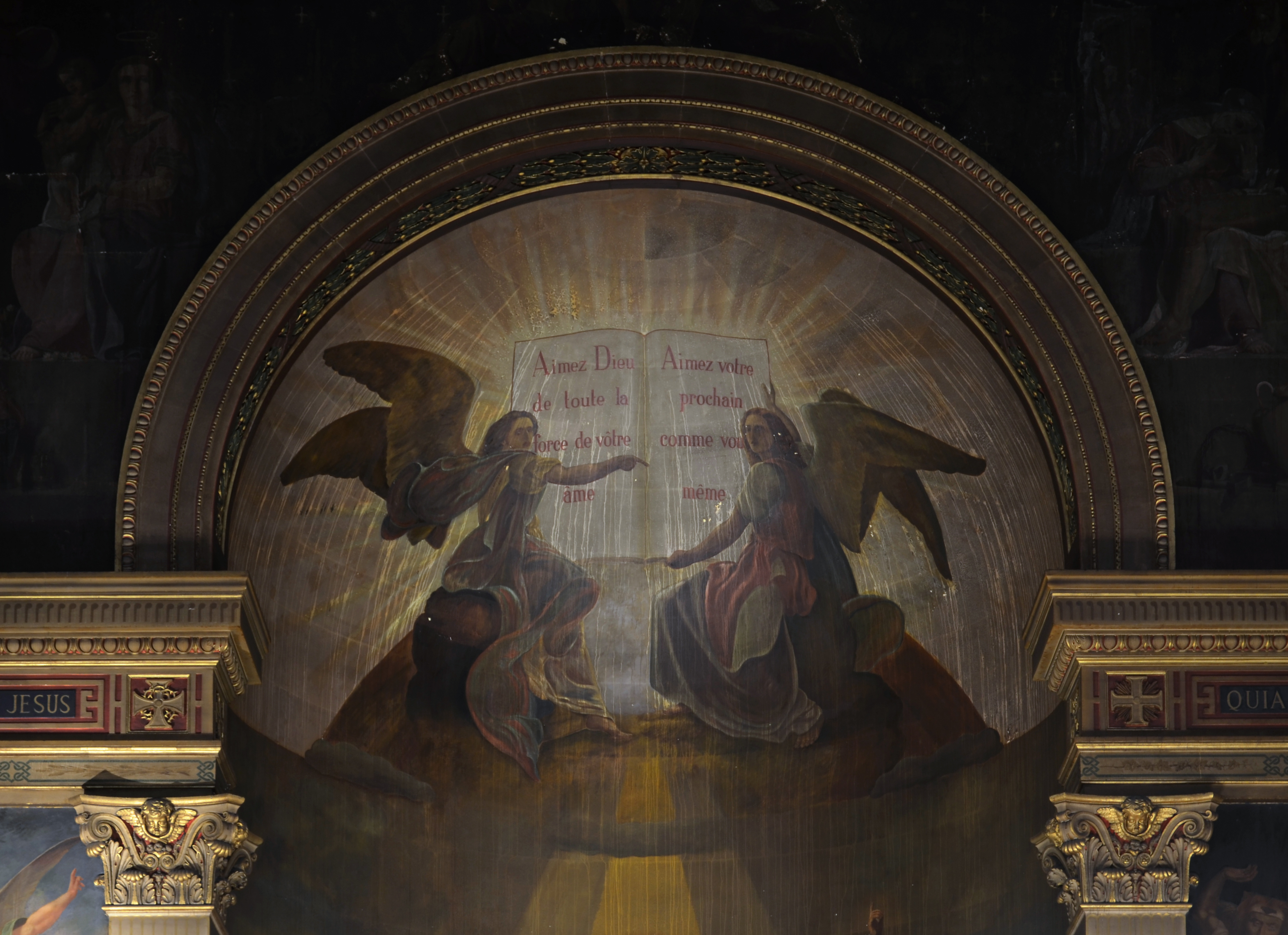
Wall painting of angels above the altar

== Stained glass ==
The figurative stained glass windows of the Apostles were created by Claudius Lavergne (1814-1887)

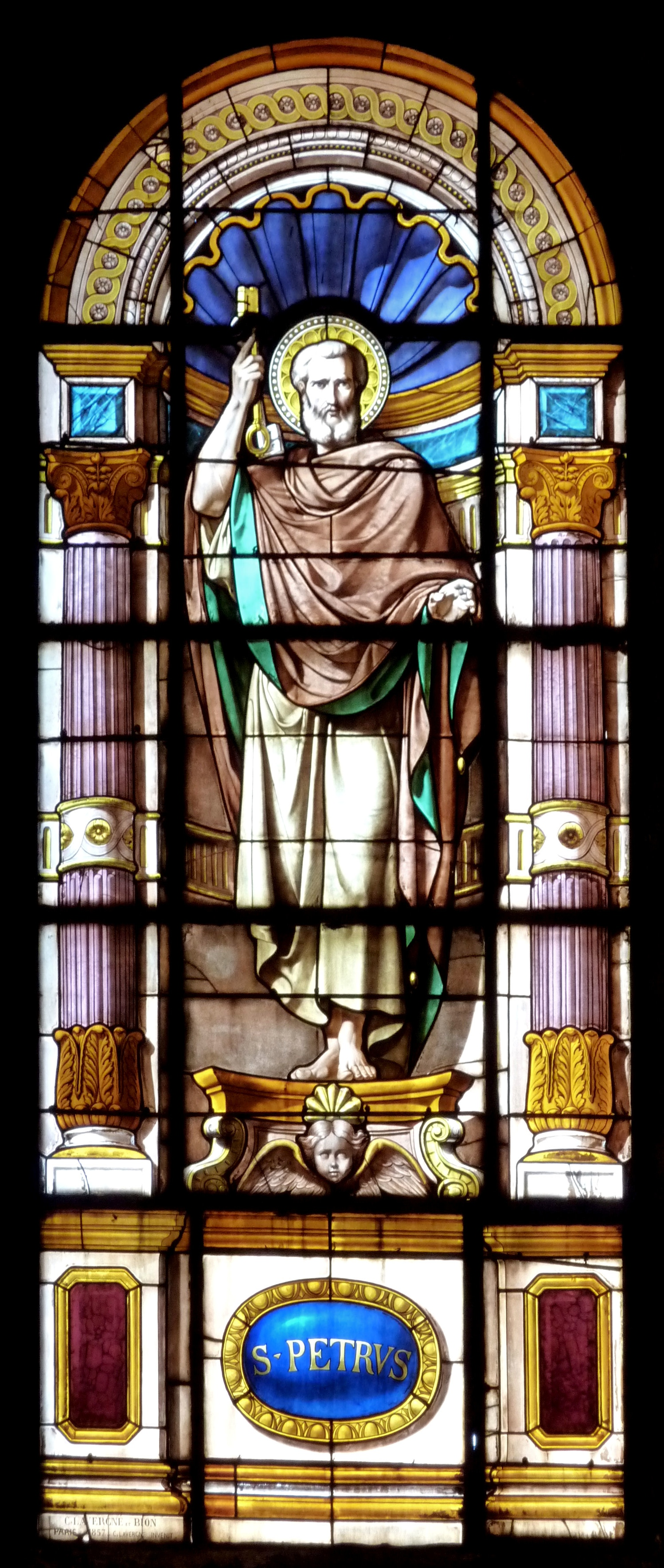
The Apostle Peter

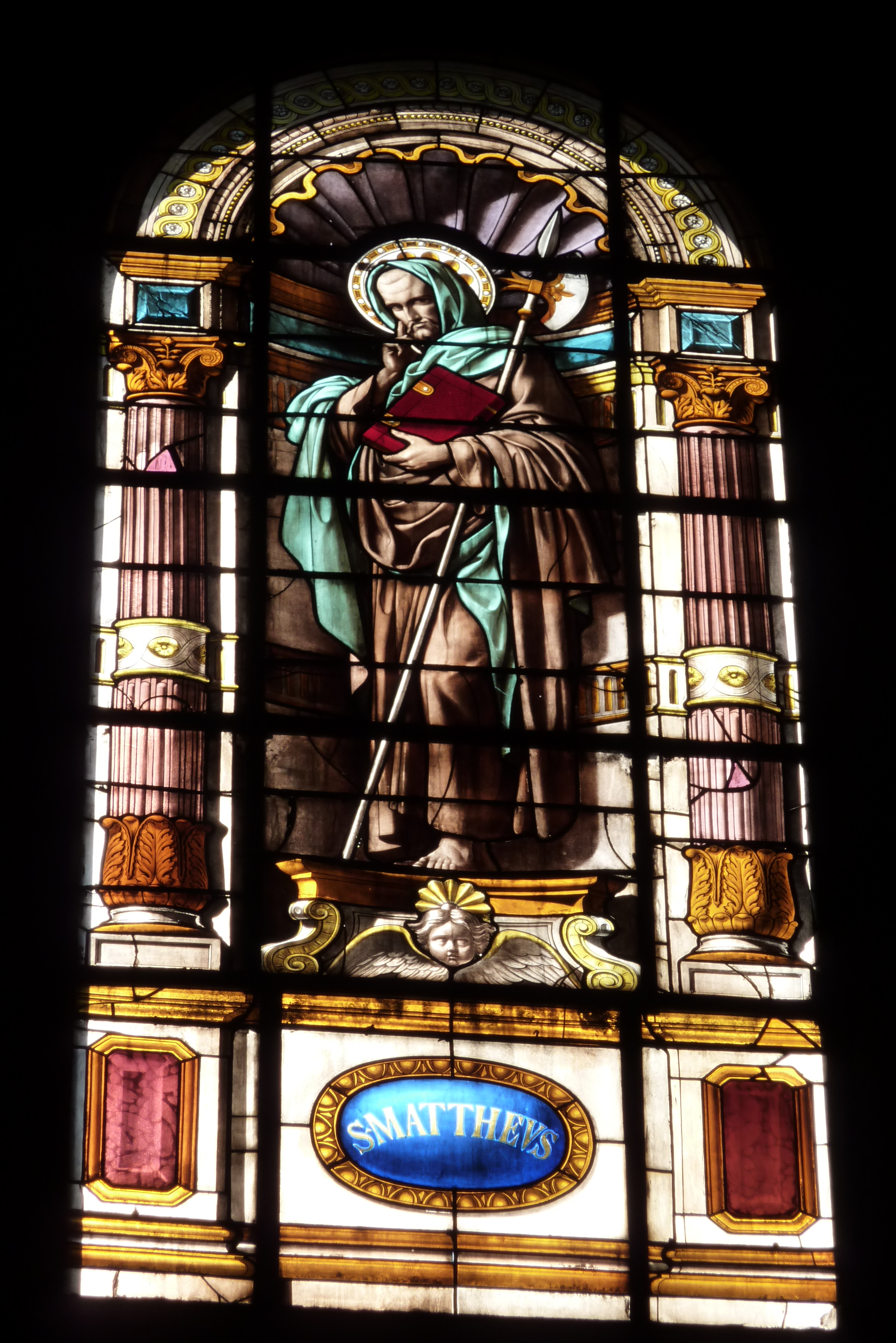
Saint Matthew

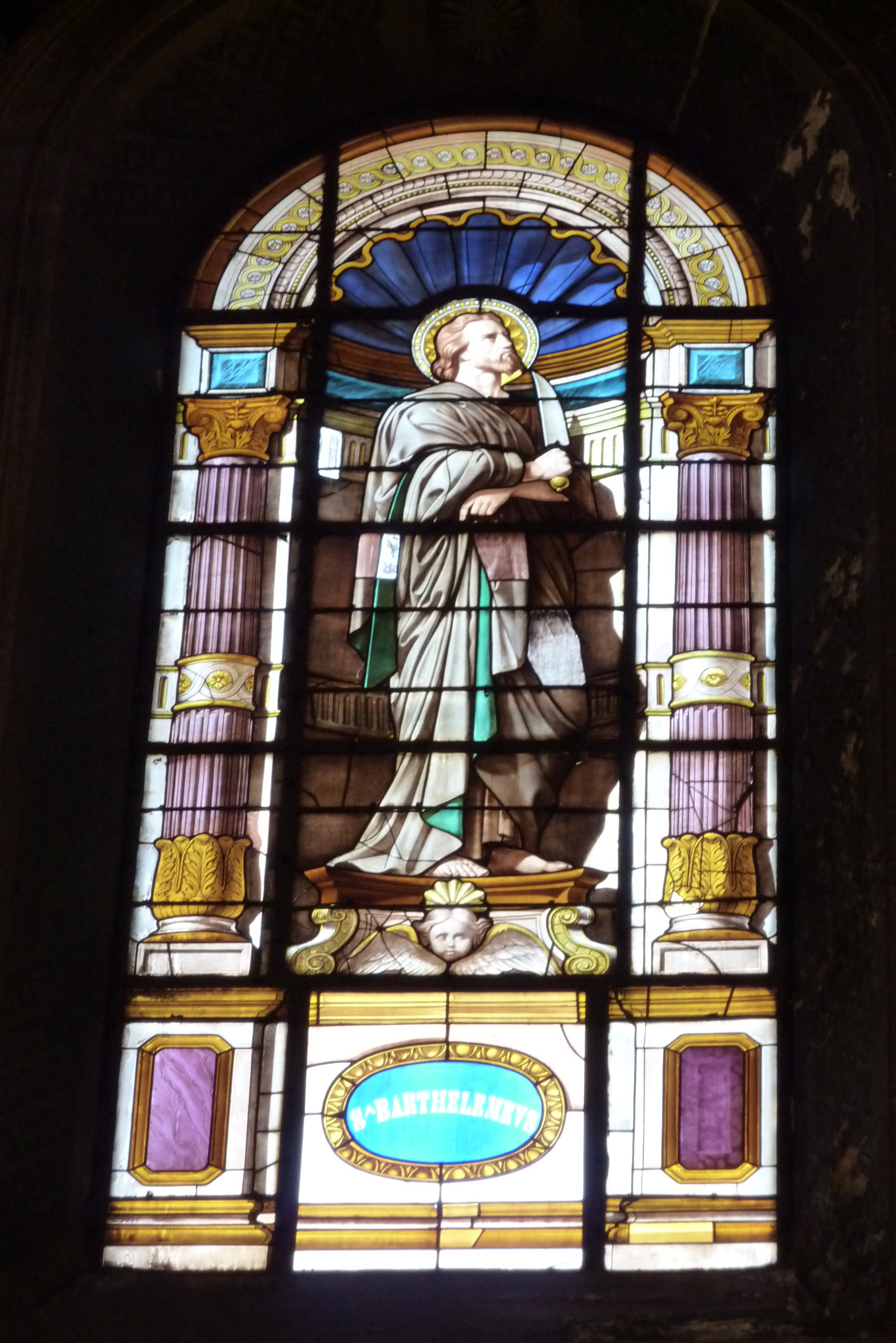
Saint Bartholomew

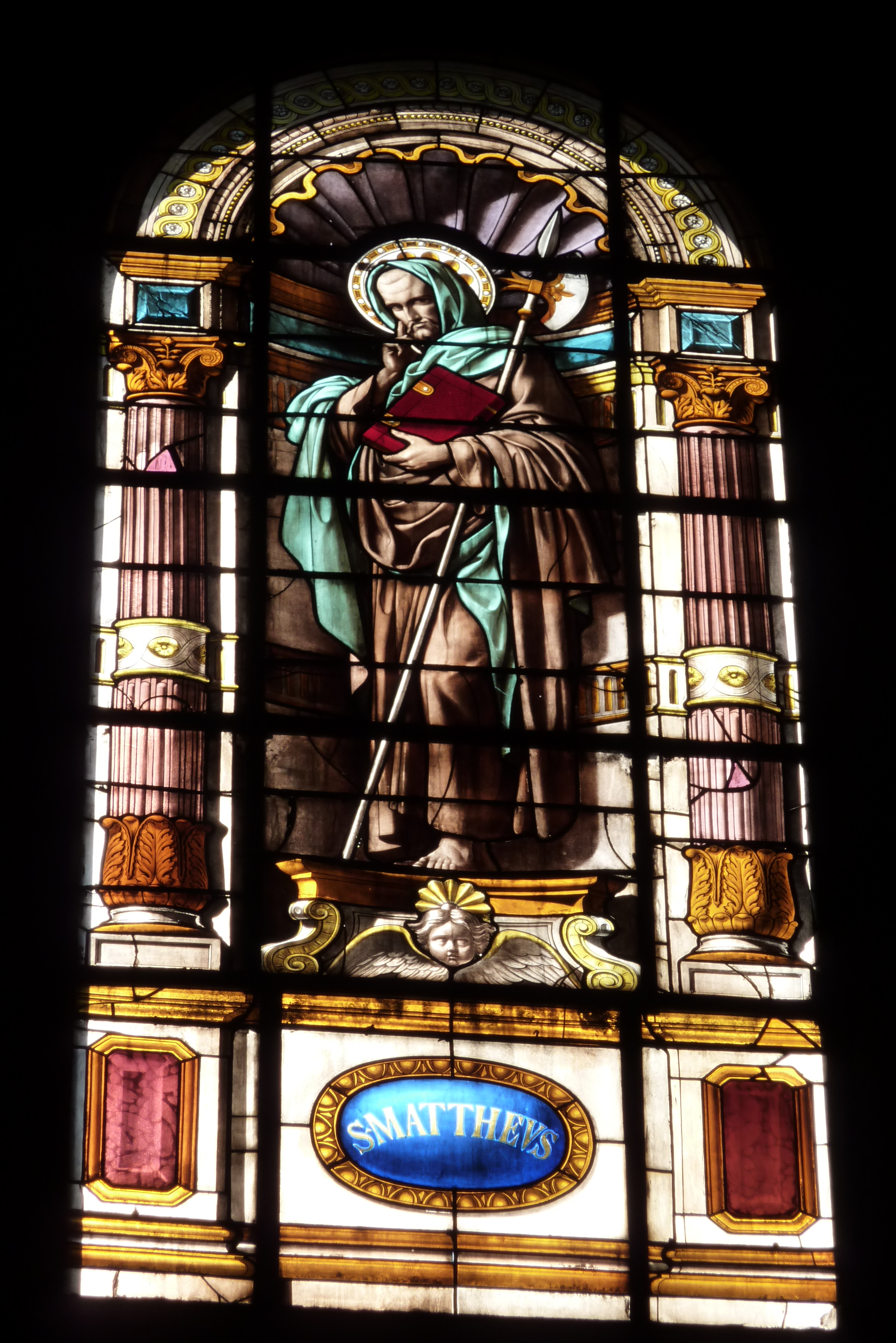
The Apostle Matthew

== See also ==
- Historic chapels of Paris
