= La Feuillade (disambiguation) =

La Feuillade is a commune in the Dordogne, France.

La Feuillade may also refer to several other things in France:

- François d'Aubusson de La Feuillade (1631–1691), 6th duc de Roannais, military officer and noble, served in the wars of Louis XIV, became a Marshal of France
- Georges d'Aubusson de La Feuillade, (1609–1697), Catholic clergyman under Louis XIV
- Louis d'Aubusson de La Feuillade (1673–1725), French courtier, and military officer in the Nine Years War and the War of the Spanish Succession.
- Lafeuillade-en-Vézie, a commune in the Cantal department

== See also ==
- Feuillade (disambiguation)
