= Quartier Vivienne =

Coordinates: 48.8667277°N 2.339757°E

Vivienne
- Quartier Vivienne
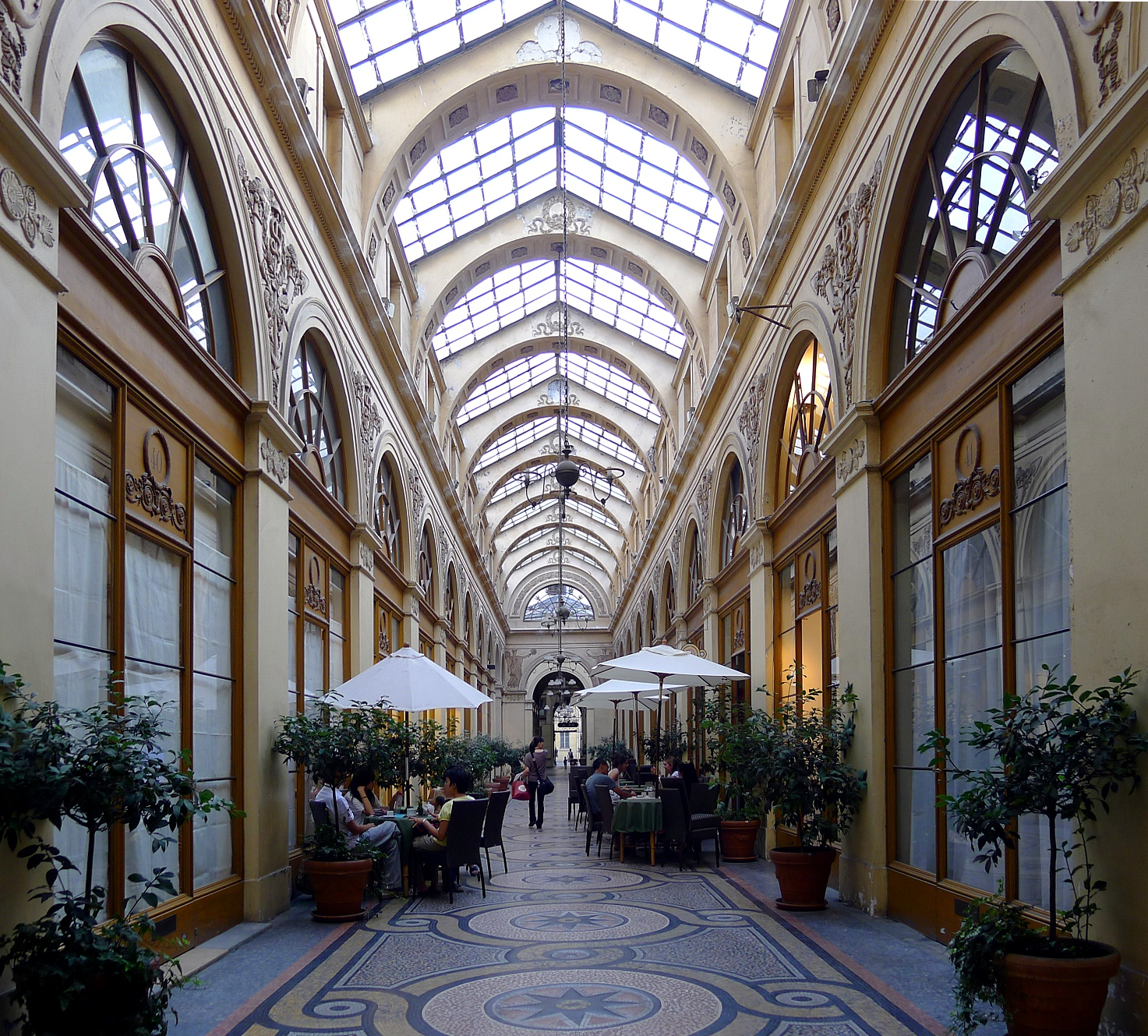
- Galerie Vivienne
- Interactive map of Vivienne
- Country: France
- Region: Île-de-France
- Ville: Paris
- Arrondissement: 2nd

Area
  - Total: 0.244 km^{2} (0.094 sq mi)

Population (2016)
  - Total: 3.046
  - Density: 12,484/km^{2} (32,330/sq mi)

The Quartier Vivienne is the 6th administrative district of Paris; It is located in the 2nd arrondissement.

== Boundaries ==
The neighborhood is bounded to the west by Rue Sainte-Anne and Rue de Gramont (bordering the Quartier Gaillon), to the north by the Boulevards des Italiens and Montmartre (bordering the 9th arrondissement), to the east by Rue Notre-Dame-des-Victoires and Rue Vide-Gousset (bordering the Quartier du Mail), and to the south by Rue La Feuillade and Rue des Petits-Champs (bordering the 1st arrondissement).

The quarters of the 2nd arrondissement

== Location and monuments ==
The district covers an area of 24.4 hectares. Notable features include:

- Galerie Vivienne, home to—among other shops—Caves Legrand,
- Galerie Colbert, housing institutions such as the Institut National d'Histoire de l'Art (INHA) and the Institut national du patrimoine (INP),
- Passage des Panoramas, featuring Caffè Stern,
- Passage des Princes,
- École nationale des chartes,
- Palais Brongniart, the former headquarters of the Paris Stock Exchange,
- Opéra-Comique,
- Bibliothèque nationale de France, occupying buildings including the Hôtel Tubeuf and the Hôtel Colbert de Torcy,
- Basilica of Notre-Dame-des-Victoires,
- Square Louvois, home to the Louvois Fountain,
- Colbert Fountain,
- AMF headquarters,
- AFP headquarters,
- AGF headquarters (which became the French headquarters of Allianz following the acquisition of AGF),
- Boulangerie Viennoise, where the croissant was invented,
- Part of Place des Victoires, including the Hôtel Cornette, Hôtel Gigault de La Salle, Hôtel Pellé de Montaleau, Hôtel de Prévenchères, and Hôtel de Metz de Rosnay,
- Hôtel de La Feuillade and Hôtel de Nevers,
- The stained-glass window titled Labor, Industry, and Commerce Enrich Humanity (Le Travail, par l'Industrie et le Commerce, enrichit l'Humanité), located at the former headquarters of the Paris Île-de-France Regional Chamber of Commerce and Industry.

== Related articles ==
- 2nd arrondissement of Paris
- Quarters of Paris
