= Feuillade =

Feuillade may refer to:

People

- Louis Feuillade (1873–1925), French film director
- Louis d'Aubusson de la Feuillade (1673–1725), Marshal of France

French communes

- Feuillade, Charente, in the Charente department
- La Feuillade, in the Dordogne department
