= Rue Croix-des-Petits-Champs =

Street in the 1st arrondissement of Paris, France

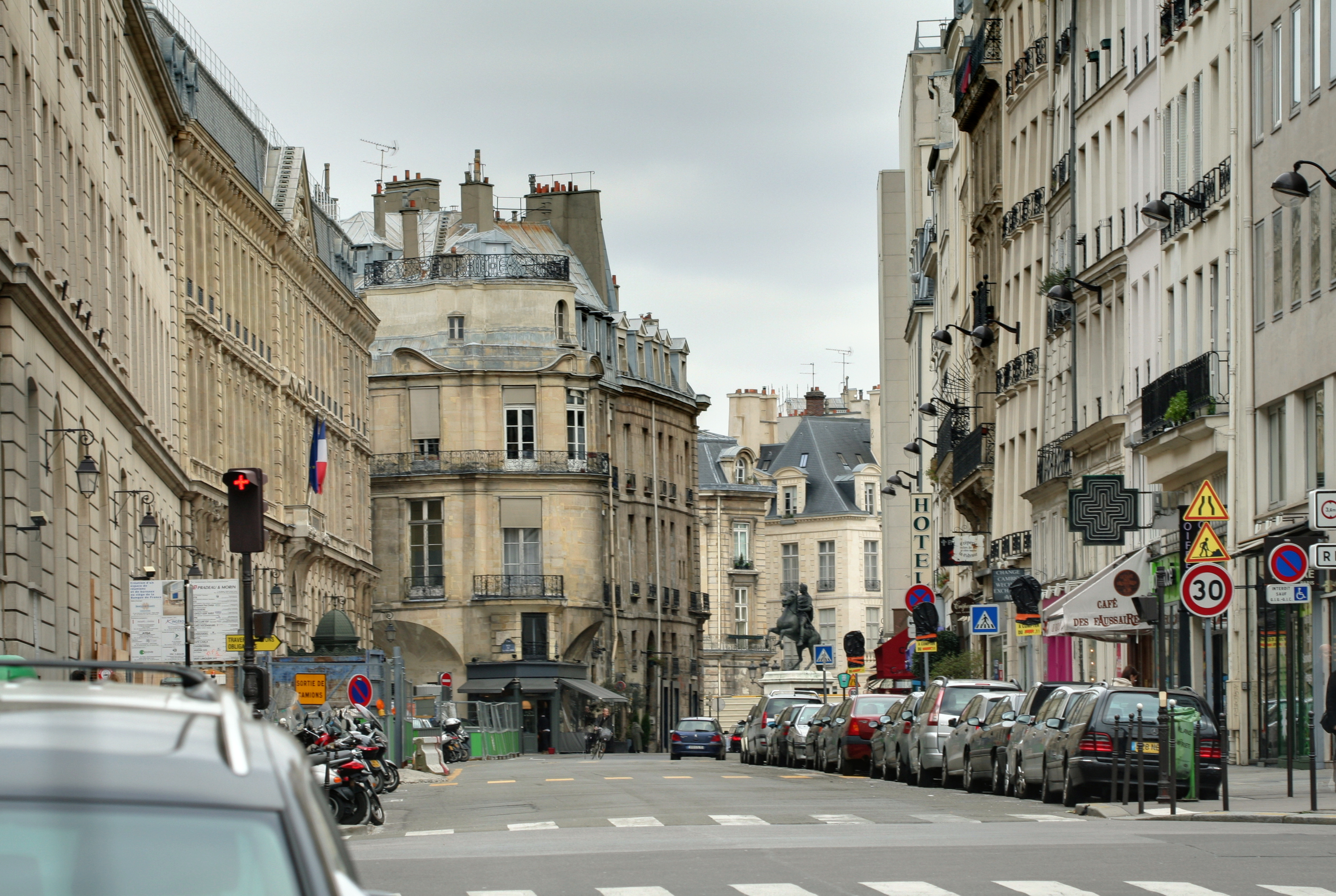
- View of the street

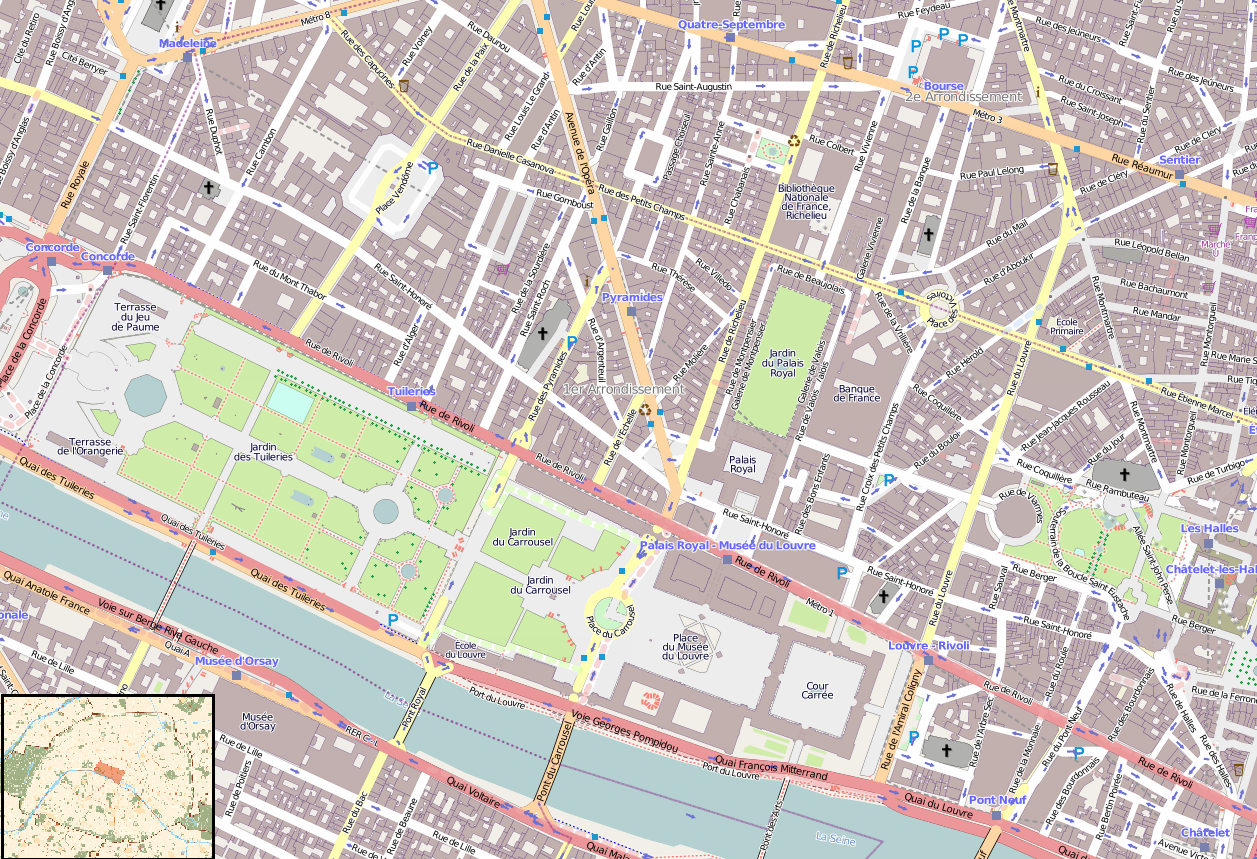
- Location within 1st arrondissement of Paris Location within Paris
- Type: Street
- Length: 373 m (1,224 ft)
- Width: between 12 and 20 m
- Arrondissement: 1st
- Quarter: Halles; Palais-Royal
- Coordinates: 48.862516°N 2.339305°E
- From: 170-182, rue Saint-Honoré
- To: 1 bis, place des Victoires

Construction
- Construction start: before the 14th century

The Rue Croix-des-Petits-Champs is a street in the 1st arrondissement of Paris, France.

== Name ==
The street was built on a land that consisted of gardens named petits champs ("small fields"). A cross (croix in French) was located next to a house in the street, near the Rue des Pélicans.

== History ==
A part of this public road was opened during the reign of King Philip Augustus. In 1685, as a part of the re-organisation of the Place des Victoires, King Louis XIV requested the houses of the road to be aligned to open a perspective onto his bronze statue. The part of the street affected by this decision was named the Rue d'Aubusson after François, Vicomte d'Aubusson, who at the time was building an hôtel particulier on the Place des Victoires. Later, the name Rue Croix-des-Petits-Champs was used for the entire road. On Germinal 3, Year X (March 24, 1802), a ministerial decision signed by Jean-Antoine Chaptal set the minimum width of the street at 10 m. The minimum width was extended to 12 m by a royal order dated May 2, 1837.

== Notable buildings ==
- No. 10: was the home of the Hôtel de l'Univers et du Portugal.
- No. 43: Hôtel Portalis or Hôtel de Jaucourt, built in 1733 by master-mason Sébastien Charpentier and designed by architect Pierre Desmaisons for Countess Pierre de Jaucourt, née Marie-Josèphe de Graves. This house has a curious façade with a projecting turret on squinches above the streets at the corner of the Rue Croix-des-Petits-Champs and the Rue La Vrillière.
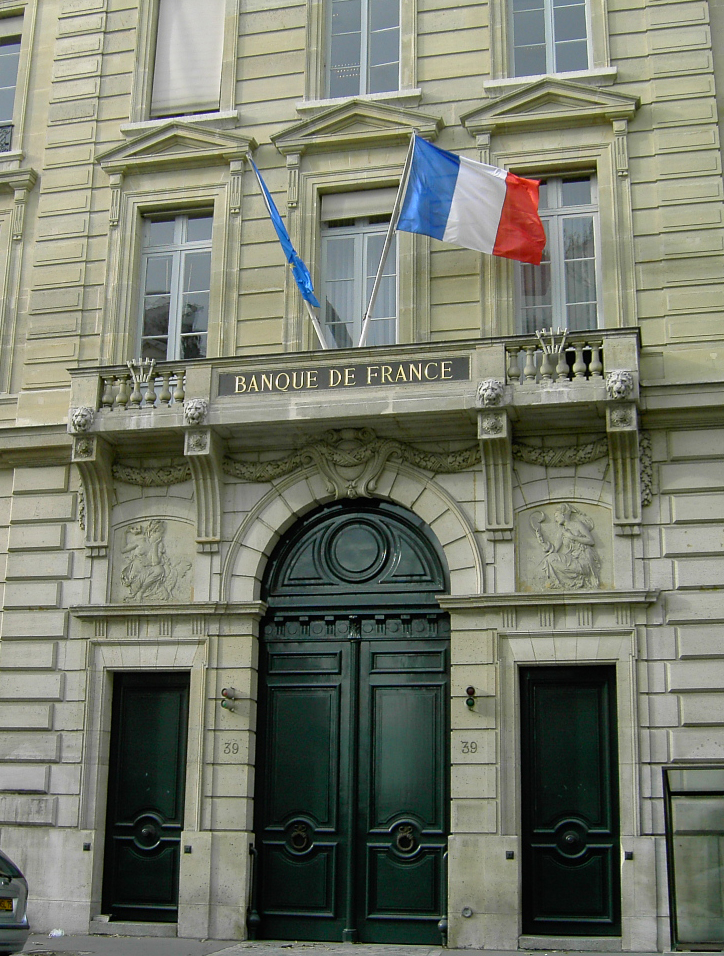
Main entrance of the Bank of France

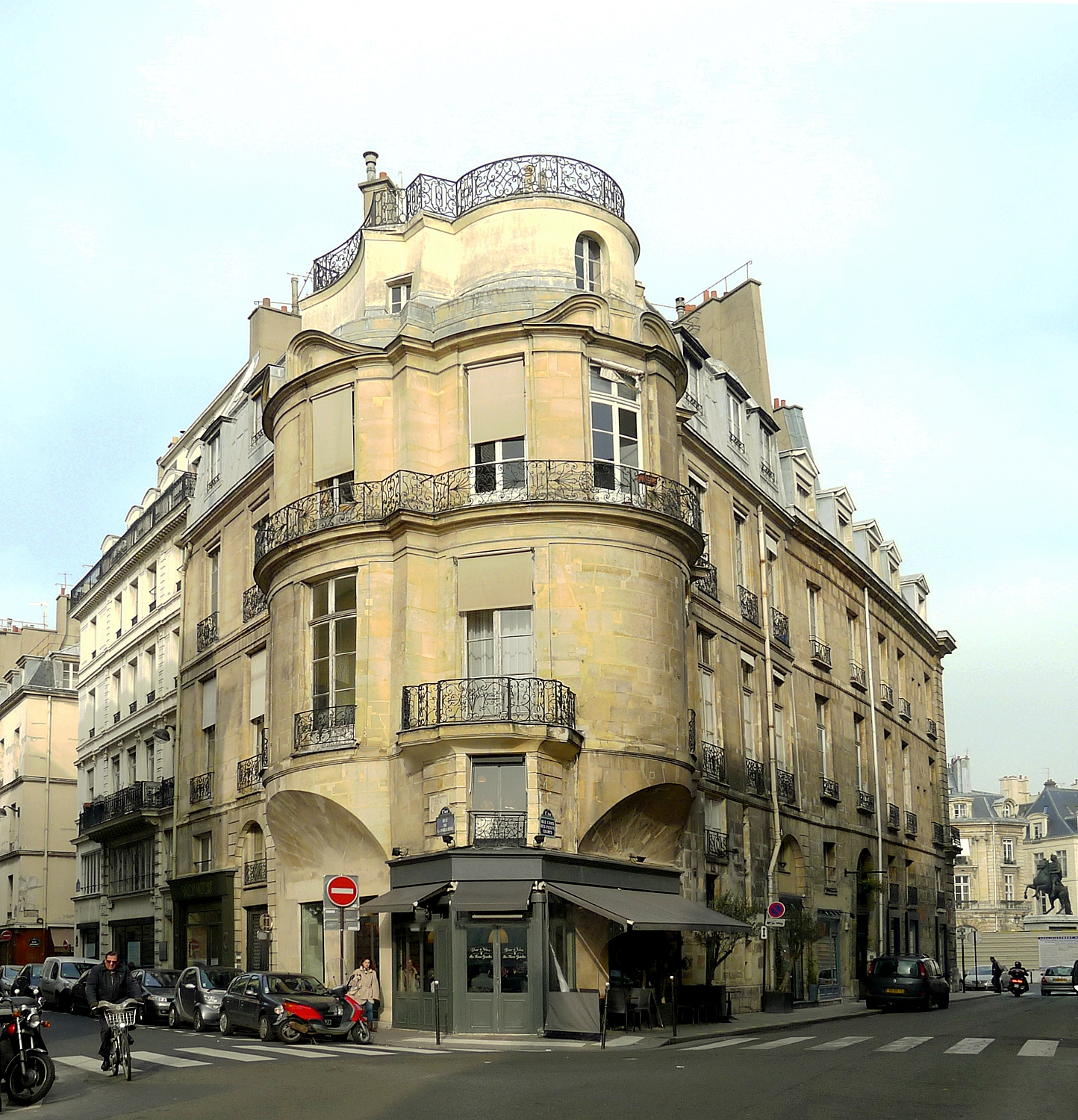
Hôtel Portalis

=== Famous inhabitants ===
- Jean-Baptiste Jacques Augustin (1759–1832), miniature portrait painter, lived at former no. 25 until at least 1831.
- Charlotte Bourette, poet, playwright and lemonade seller, ran Le Café Allemand in the eighteenth century
- In 1793, Doctor Guillotin resided at the Hôtel Gesvres on the Rue Croix-des-Petites-Champs.
- Famous lawyer Nicolas Tripier lived at no. 42 (Hôtel de Lussan).

== See also ==
- List of streets in the 1st arrondissement of Paris
