= Rue Sainte-Anne =

Street in Paris, France

Coordinates: 48°52′2″N 2°20′10″E

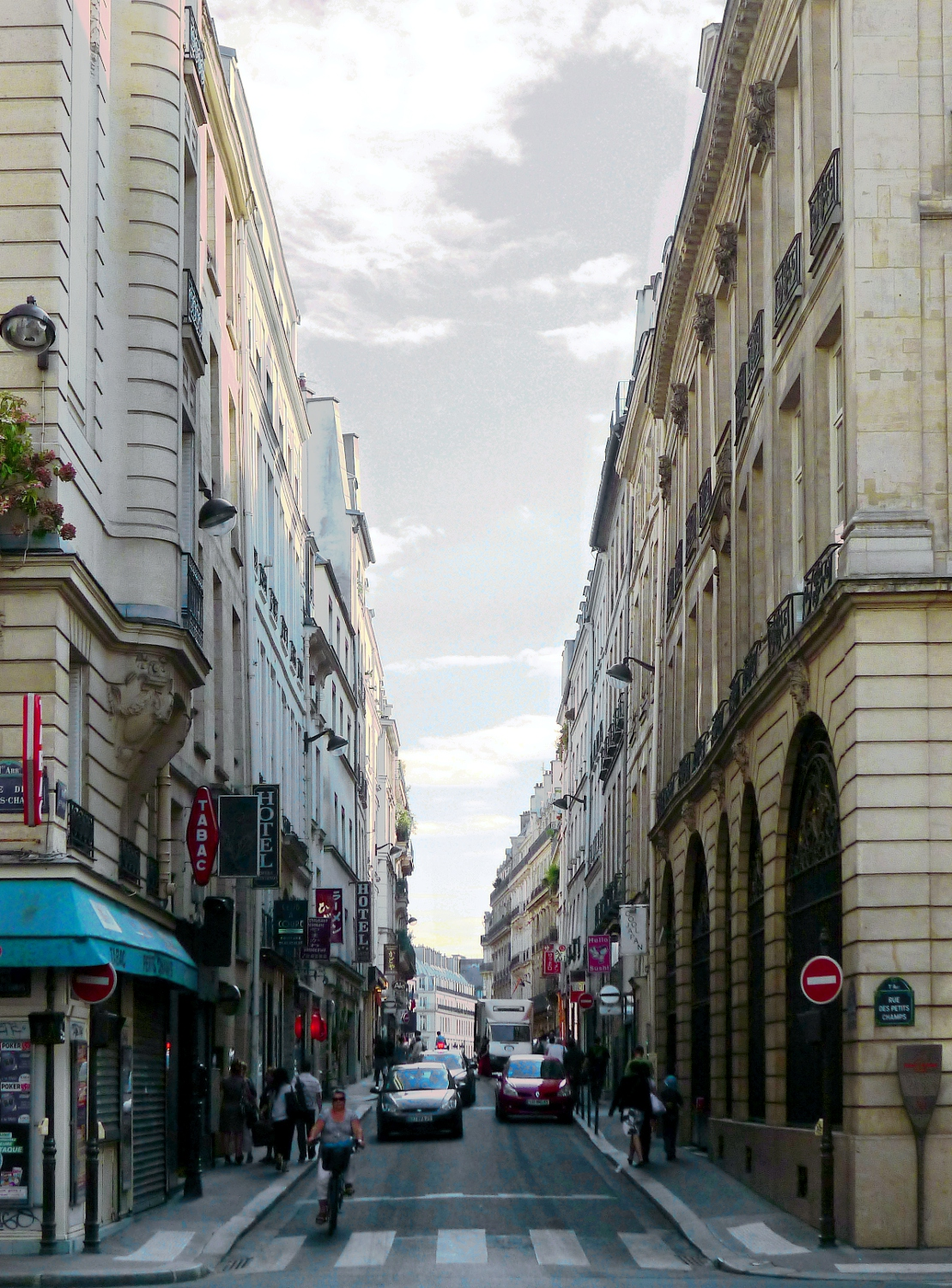
- Rue Sainte-Anne as seen from the Rue des Petits-Champs

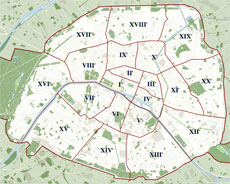
- Length: 440 m
- Width: min. 10 m
- Arrondissement: 1/2
- Quarter: Palais-Royal; Gaillon; Vivienne

The Rue Sainte-Anne is a street in the 1st and 2nd arrondissement of Paris.
