= Siege of Besançon =

Siege during the Franco-Dutch War

Coordinates: 47.2431°N 6.0219°E

- Part of the Franco-Dutch War
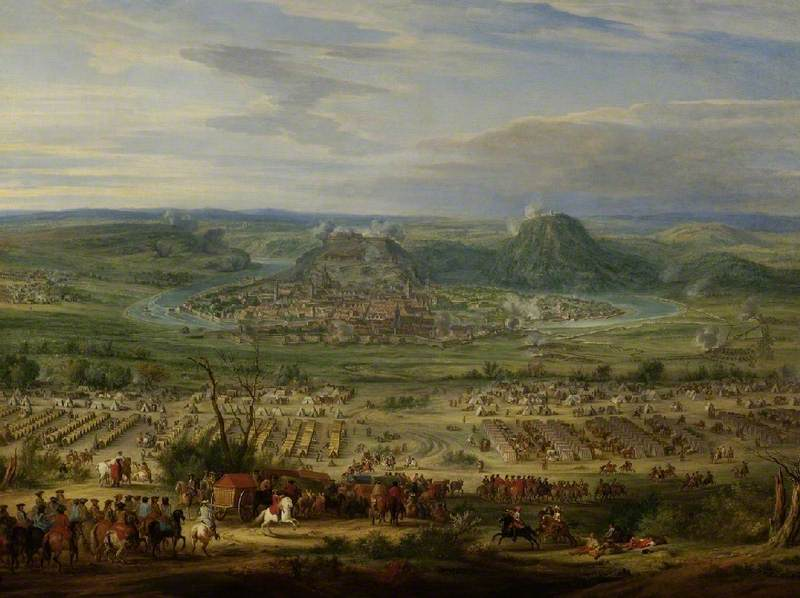
- Overview of the siege of Besançon; on the right, smoke from the cannons installed on Chaudanne by Vauban.
| Date | 26 April to 22 May 1674 |
| Location | Besançon, modern Bourgogne-Franche-Comté, France |
| Result | French victory |

Belligerents
| France | Spain; Holy Roman Empire |

Commanders and leaders
| (Kingdom of France) Louis XIV (Kingdom of France) Duc d'Enghien (Kingdom of France) Vauban (Kingdom of France) De Revel | (Spain) Saint-Mauris (Holy Roman Empire) Vaudémont |

Strength
| 15,000–20,000 | 3,300 regulars 1,500 city militia |

Casualties and losses
| 700–1,000 | Minimal |

The siege of Besançon took place from 25 April to 22 May 1674 during the Franco-Dutch War, when French forces nominally led by Louis XIV invaded Franche-Comté, then part of the Spanish Empire.

Siege works were supervised by the duc d'Enghien, eldest son of le Grand Condé, and French military engineer Sébastien Le Prestre de Vauban. The defenders were commanded by Vaudémont but the town's isolated position meant they could only delay capture. The bulk of French casualties were caused by a botched assault, allegedly launched to impress Louis, before the garrison surrendered and were allowed free passage to the Spanish Netherlands.

Under the 1678 Treaties of Nijmegen, the province was annexed by France and Besançon replaced Dole as the regional capital.

== Background ==
In the 1667–1668 War of Devolution, France captured most of the Spanish Netherlands and Franche-Comté before a Dutch-led coalition forced Louis XIV to return most of their gains in the Treaty of Aix-la-Chapelle (1668) and Louis began plans to attack the Republic directly.

In May 1672, French forces invaded the Dutch Republic and initially seemed to have achieved an overwhelming victory but by late July, the Dutch position had stabilised. Concern at French gains led to the August 1673 Treaty of the Hague between the Republic, Brandenburg-Prussia, Emperor Leopold and Charles II of Spain; in early 1674, Denmark–Norway joined the Alliance, while England and the Dutch made peace in the Treaty of Westminster.

Forced into another war of attrition and with new fronts opening in Spain, Sicily and the Rhineland, French troops withdrew from the Dutch Republic by the end of 1673, retaining only Grave and Maastricht. Instead, Louis focused on Franche-Comté, capturing Gray and Vesoul in February 1674. François-Michel le Tellier, Marquis de Louvois, French Minister of War, planned to attack Salins-les-Bains then Dole next, but the French military engineer Vauban persuaded him to take Besançon first.

== Siege ==
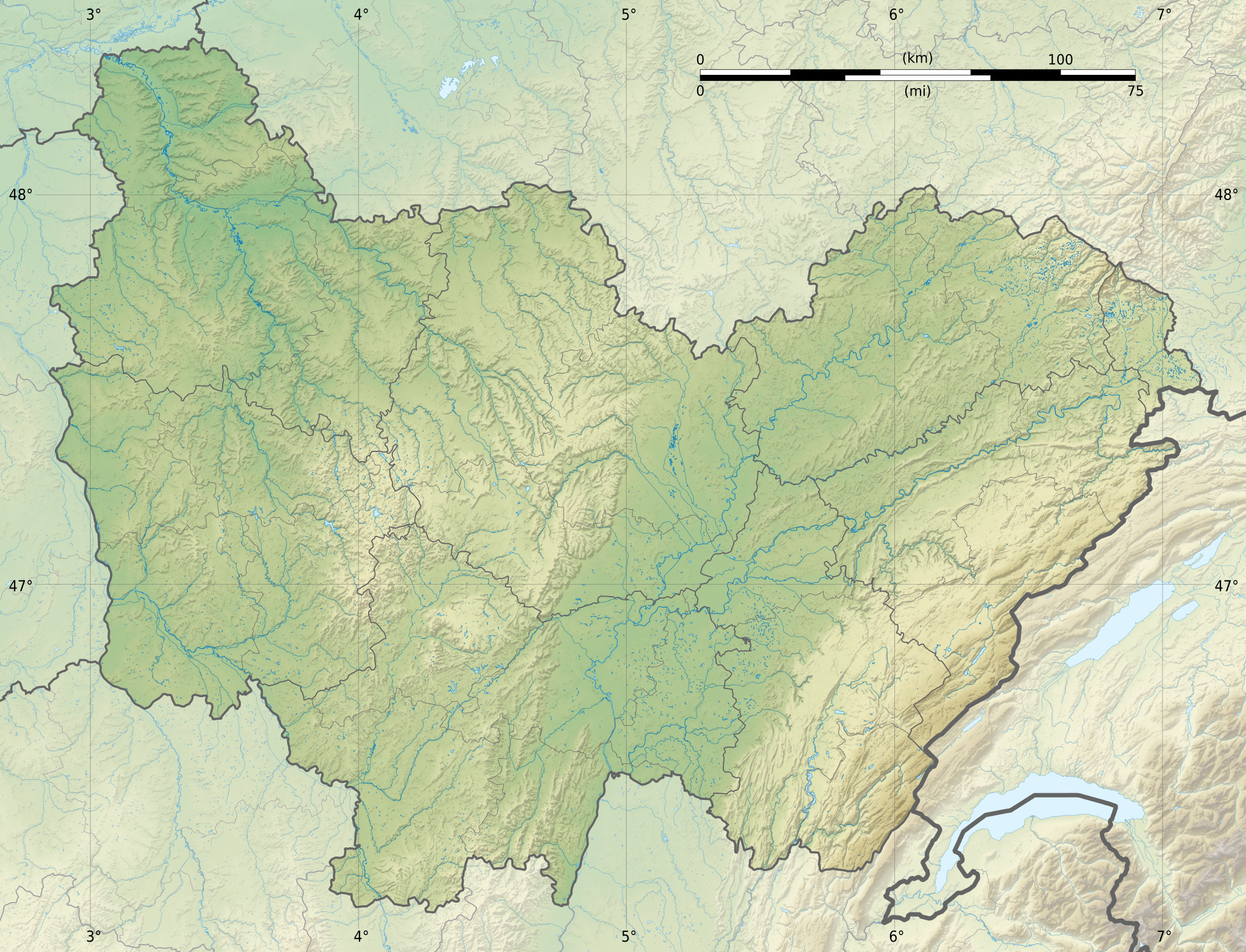
Modern department of Bourgogne-Franche-Comté; key locations in the 1674 campaign

After the capture of Besançon in 1667, Vauban drew up plans for strengthening the defences; when it was returned to Spain in 1668, his design was adopted by the Italian engineer Precipiano. Spanish resources were stretched by the need to rebuild the defences of Dole and Gray, which were destroyed when the French withdrew in 1668; this meant work on the outer wall and citadel were only partially complete by 1674.

As was the practice, the towns' defences were split between the outer 'City,' containing the main residential and commercial quarters, and the inner 'Citadel.' The garrison was commanded by a Spanish officer, Baron Francois de Saint-Mauris but overall command was held by an Imperial general, Prince Vaudémont, since Besançon was a Free Imperial City of the Holy Roman Empire. A French army of 15,000–20,000 led by Duc d'Enghien arrived on 25 April; most of these troops were positioned outside the suburbs of Battant, Charmont and Arènes, with a secondary force under Charles Antoine de Revel stationed at Buis and Beure.

Operations began on 26 April, directed by Vauban who was familiar with the defences based on his earlier work. Besançon was located on the River Doubs, which ran through the town; siege works were constructed next to the Porte d'Arènes on the right bank and the suburb of Chamars on the left. After considerable effort, the artillery was placed on hills overlooking the town at Chaudanne and Bregille and the bombardment commenced on 1 May.

Louis arrived in the French camp the next day; while he often attended sieges for purposes of prestige, he was rarely involved in operations. At Besançon he helped supervise the emplacement of artillery batteries, exposing him to counter-battery fire from the town, one shot killing a nearby staff member. After this was completed on 6 May, the town was subjected to constant bombardment from five different locations and the Chamar quarter had to be flooded to prevent its loss after assaults on the nights of 6/7 and 8/9 May.

The attackers suffered heavy casualties, which Vauban later complained were entirely avoidable and launched largely to impress Louis; however, the defenders were unable to respond effectively to the French bombardment and there was no hope of relief. By 13 May, several breaches had been made in the walls around the Arènes gate; the protocol of the time was that if a garrison fought on after a 'practical breach,' the attackers were entitled to sack and destroy the city. Following a meeting on 14 May, the town council asked for terms of surrender; these were granted by Louis, who entered the city on 15 May.

The Citadel held out for another week, repulsing an assault on 20 May led by François de La Feuillade and the Gardes Francaises. However, the garrison's position was hopeless and two days later, Vaudémont surrendered; he was given free passage to the Spanish Netherlands along with 800 other survivors.

== Aftermath ==
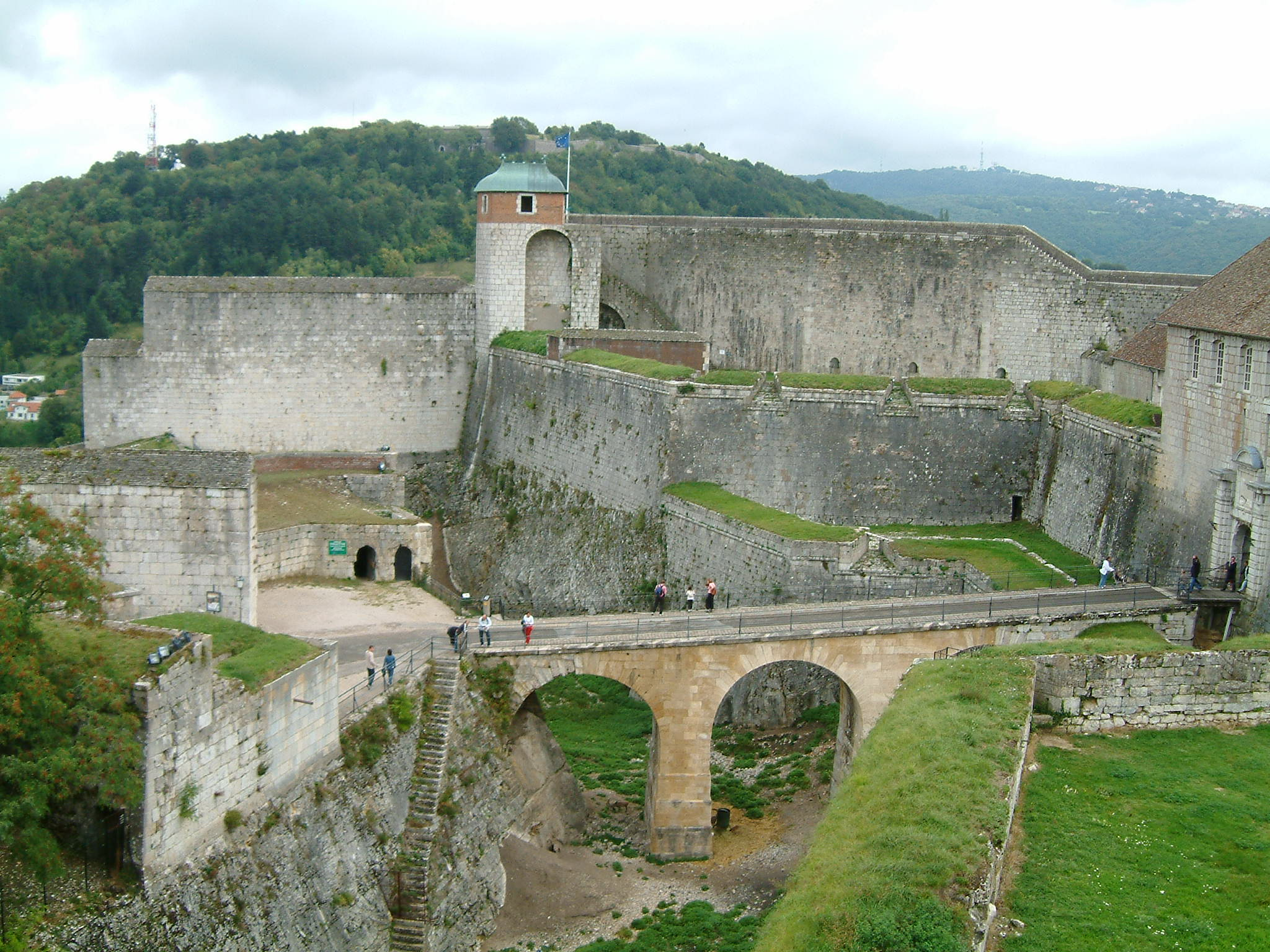
The Citadel at Besançon, designed by Vauban in 1667 and only partially complete in 1674

On 27 May, Louis left Besançon and moved onto Dole, which was already besieged by d'Enghien; the town surrendered on 7 June, followed by Salins-les-Bains on 10th. With the conquest complete, many of the French troops were sent to join the Great Condé's army in the Spanish Netherlands and fought at the Battle of Seneffe in August.

In 1676, the regional capital was moved from Dole to Besançon, which became the site of the Regional Parlement. The province remained unstable, with security threatened by guerrilla bands known as loups de bois, as well as Imperial troops campaigning in the Rhineland. The huge costs of the war led to conflict over taxes and expenditure; when the Besançon magistrates were ordered to repair damage caused by the recent siege, they refused, arguing it was the responsibility of the French Crown. When forced to comply, the work was carried out very slowly; similar arguments took place over supplying the French garrison.

During the siege, Étienne Morel, a French Army surgeon, reportedly used a tourniquet to control haemorrhage from battlefield injuries, the first time this technique was applied.

== See also ==
- Louis XIV Victory Monument

== Sources ==
- Davenport, Frances Gardiner; Paullin, Charles Oscar, eds. (1917). European Treaties Bearing on the History of the United States and Its Dependencies, Vol. 2: 1650-1697 (2018 ed.). Forgotten Books. ISBN 978-0483158924.
- De Périni, Hardÿ (1896). Batailles françaises, Volume V (in French). Ernest Flammarion.
- Dee, Darryl (2009). Expansion and Crisis in Louis XIV's France: Franche-Comté and Absolute Monarchy, 1674-1715: Franche-Comte and Absolute Monarchy, 1674-1715. University of Rochester Press. ISBN 978-1580463034.
- Goode, Dominic (2003). "Besancon". fortified-places.com. Archived from the original on 14 May 2011.
- Lepage, Jean-Denis (2009). Vauban and the French Military Under Louis XIV: An Illustrated History of Fortifications and Sieges. McFarland & Co. ISBN 978-0786444014.
- Lynn, John (1996). The Wars of Louis XIV, 1667-1714 (Modern Wars In Perspective). Longman. ISBN 978-0582056299.
- Out on a limb. "A History of Prosthetics and Amputation Surgery". Out on a Limb. Archived from the original on 2020-02-08.
- Pujo, Bernard (1991). Vauban. Albin Michel. ISBN 978-2226052506. (French);
