= Siege of Nice (1705) =

1705 siege

Coordinates: 43.6959°N 7.2714°E

- Part of War of the Spanish Succession
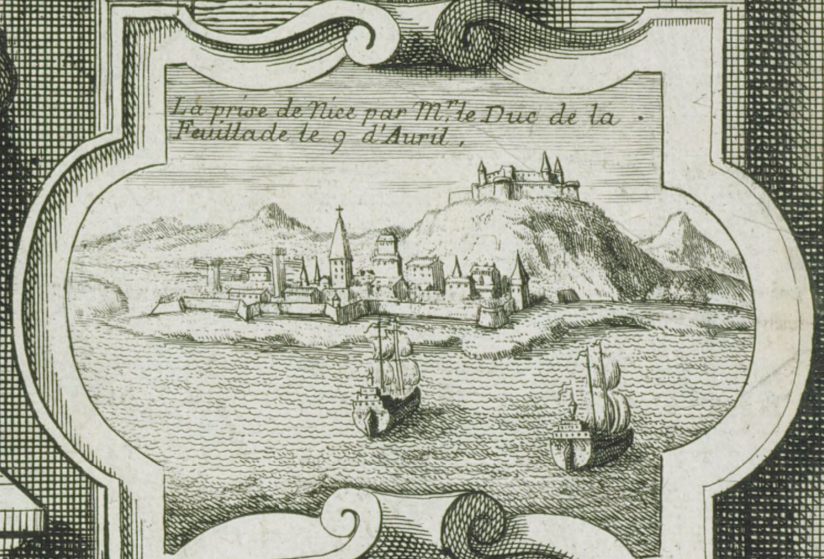
- Siege of Nice in 1705 (engraving in Almanach pour l'an de grace MDCCVI, 1706)
Date	15 March 1705 – 4 January 1706
Location	Nice, France
Result	French victory

Belligerents
France	Savoy

Commanders and leaders
(Kingdom of France) Louis d'Aubusson de La Feuillade (Kingdom of France) Duke of Berwick	(Duchy of Savoy) Marquis of Caraglio

The siege of Nice took place between 15 March 1705 and 4 January 1706 as part of the War of the Spanish Succession. It pitched the forces of Louis XIV of France against those of Victor Amadeus II of Savoy – the latter were led by the marquis of Caraglio.

== Course ==
French forces massed on the west bank of the River Var, giving warning of preparations for an invasion. However, the Savoy stronghold at Nice did not prepare for a siege – at the end of the year, its powder reserves were sent to the Piedmont.

In spring 1705 the French armies under the command of duc de La Feuillade laid siege to the imposing bastions and towers of the town of Nice. Its citadel and castle overlooked the town on a rocky spur, surrounded by a 2.3-kilometre and 8-metre-high (26 ft) wall. Inside this initial fortified line, a second higher and bigger wall flanked by towers marked the outline of the castle's citadel.

The French forces in the River Po plain posed a threat to Nice. A truce was concluded for six months, allowing reinforcements into Piedmont. The duke of Berwick was sent to win the siege. 113 cannon and mortars reduced Nice Castle to ruin after a 54-day bombardment. It was immediately razed "as if it had never existed" on the instructions of Louis XIV.
