= Charlotte Bourette =

French poet and lemonadier (1714–1784)

Charlotte Bourette (née Reynier, 1714–1784), known by the sobriquet La Muse Limonadière, was a French poet, playwright and lemonadier (lemonade seller).

== Biography ==
Bourette was born in Paris in 1714. Bourette married Sieur Curé. She was widowed before 1750 and remarried Sieur Bourette. She had no formal literary training.

Bourette was proprietress of the Le Café Allemand ('The German Café') on Rue Croix-des-Petits-Champs in the 1st arrondissement of Paris, from 1742. Her café was frequented by literary men and poets. French philosopher Voltaire gifted Bourette with a porcelain cup and she wrote a poem for him in return. She was known by the sobriquet La Muse Limonadière.

In 1778, Bourette retired to Versailles. She maintained literary correspondence with some of eighteenth-century France's most influential writers, including Claude Adrien Helvétius, Jean Jacques Rousseau and Voltaire.

In 1779, Bourette published the one act comedic play La Coquette punie, which was performed in Théatre Français in Maastricht, The Netherlands. Her plays were occasionally performed at her Café in Paris.

Bourette died in 1784.

== Publications ==
=== Poetry ===
- Ode au Roi de Prusse, par Madame Curé (1750)
- Epitaphe acrostiche sur la mort de Mme la Marquise de Mailly (1751)
- A Monseigneur le Dauphin. A Madame la Dauphine (1752)
- La Muse limonadière, ou Recueil d’ouvrages en vers et en prose, par Mme Bourette, cy-devant Mme Curé, avec les différentes pièces qui lui ont été adressées (1755, 2 volumes)

=== Plays ===
- La Coquette punie (1779)
