= Quartier des Halles =

Coordinates: 48.8626996°N 2.346214°E

Halles
- Quarteier des Halles
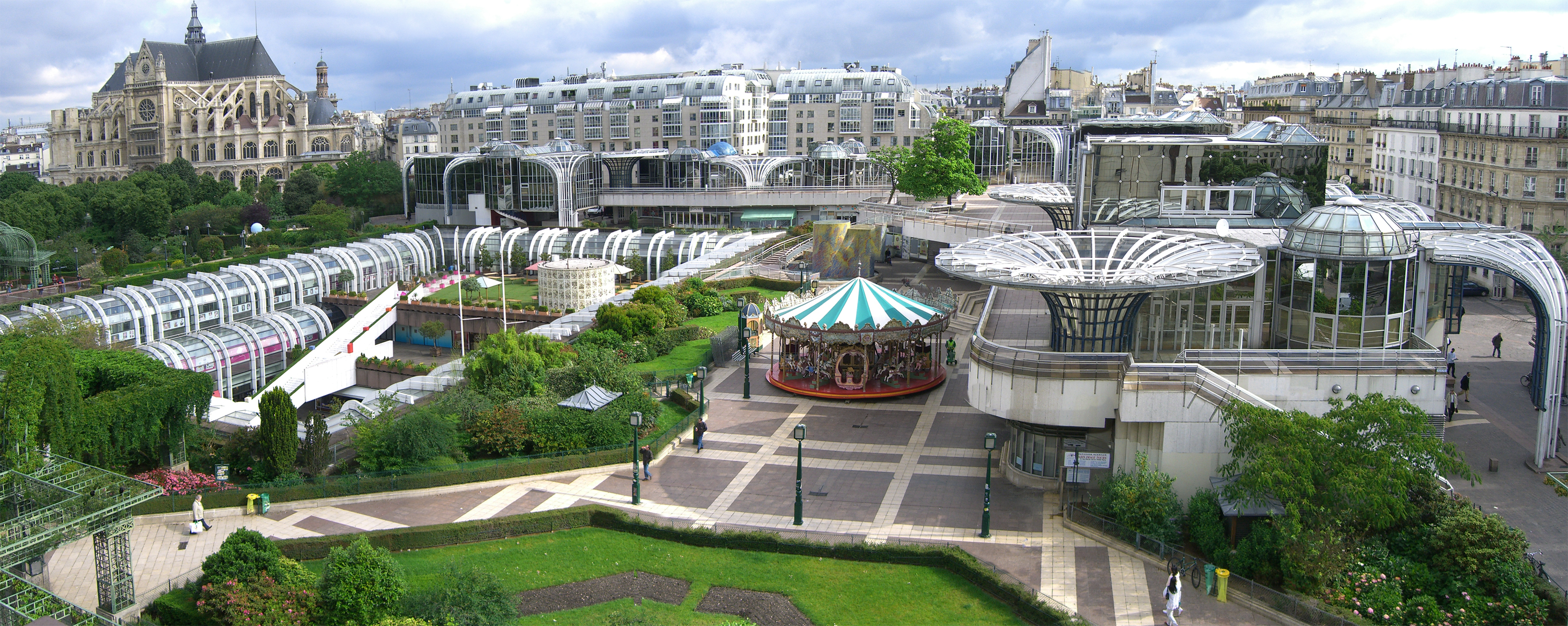
- Les Halles
- Interactive map of Halles
- Country: France
- Region: Île-de-France
- Ville: Paris
- Arrondissement: 1st

Area
  - Total: 0.412 km^{2} (0.159 sq mi)

Population (2016)
  - Total: 8,869
  - Density: 21,527/km^{2} (55,750/sq mi)

The Quartier des Halles is the second administrative district in Paris, forming part of the 1st arrondissement. Covering an area of 41.2 hectares, it is bounded by Rue de Rivoli to the south, Rue Croix-des-Petits-Champs to the west, Rue Étienne-Marcel to the north, and Boulevard de Sébastopol to the east.

The district is named after the old Les Halles market; the Forum des Halles—a commercial and cultural center featuring a park of the same name and the vast underground RER station Châtelet – Les Halles—was built on this site in the 1970s and serves as the district's natural hub.

== Sites and monuments ==
- Église Saint-Eustache
- Fontaine des Innocents
- Bourse de commerce
- Forum des Halles

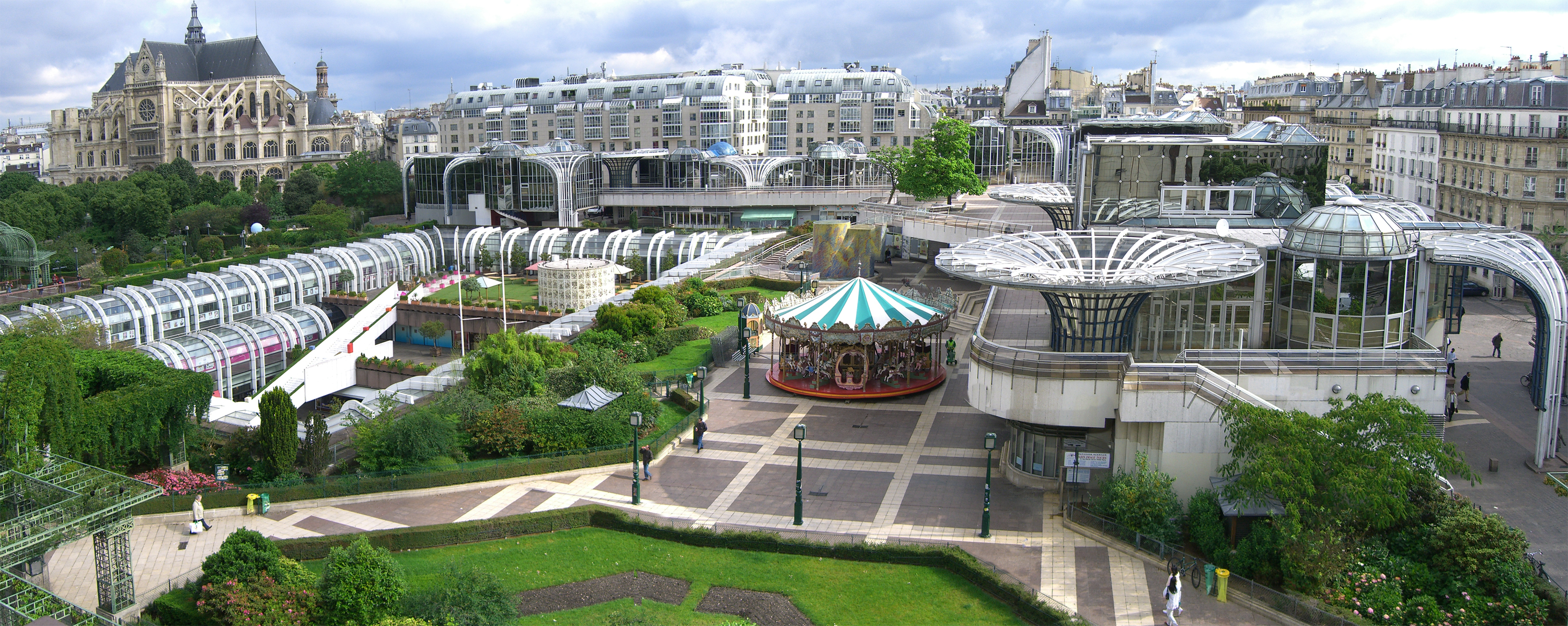
The Forum des Halles in June 2007, before the construction of "La Canopée" between 2011 and 2016.

The administrative districts of the first arrondissement: the district of Halles is on the right of the map.
