= Place des Victoires =

Square in Paris, France

Coordinates: 48°51′57″N 2°20′28″E

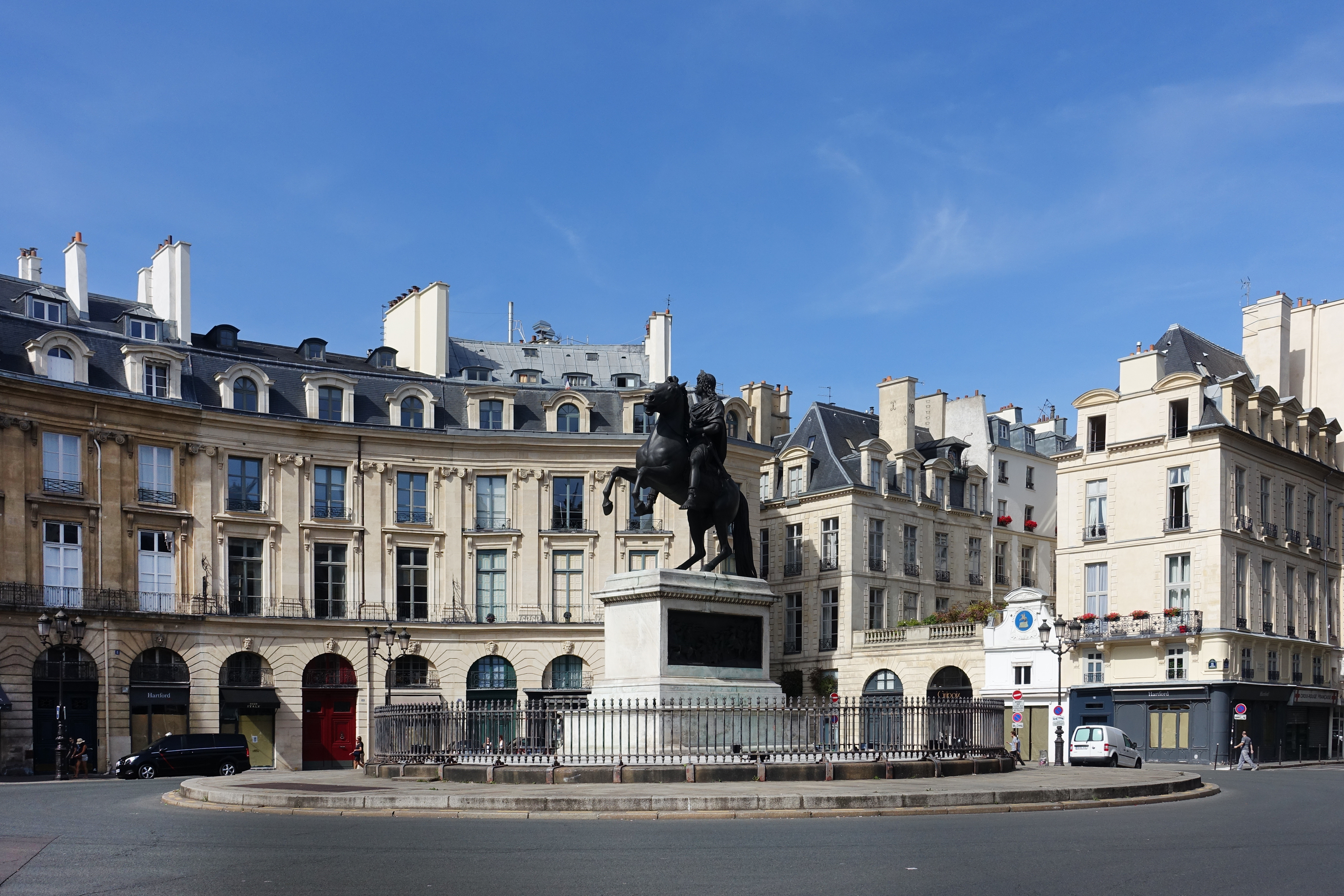
A view of the Place des Victoires with the equestrian statue of Louis XIV at its centre.

The Place des Victoires (French pronunciation: [plas de viktwaʁ]; English: Victory Square, lit. 'Square of Victories') is a circular square in central Paris, located a short distance northeast of the Palais-Royal and straddling the border between the 1st and the 2nd arrondissements. The Place des Victoires is at the confluence of six streets: the Rue de la Feuillade, Rue Vide-Gousset, Rue d'Aboukir, Rue Étienne-Marcel, Rue Croix-des-Petits-Champs and Rue Catinat.

== History ==
At the centre of the Place des Victoires is an equestrian monument in honour of King Louis XIV, celebrating the Treaties of Nijmegen concluded in 1678–79. A marshal of France, François de la Feuillade, vicomte d'Aubusson, on his own speculative initiative, demolished the old private mansions on the site. Feuillade's project was soon taken over by the Bâtiments du Roi, a department attached to the king's household, and the royal architect, Jules Hardouin-Mansart, was entrusted with redesigning a grander complex of buildings, still in the form of a ring of private houses, to accommodate a majestic statue of the triumphant king.

=== Hardouin-Mansart's conception ===
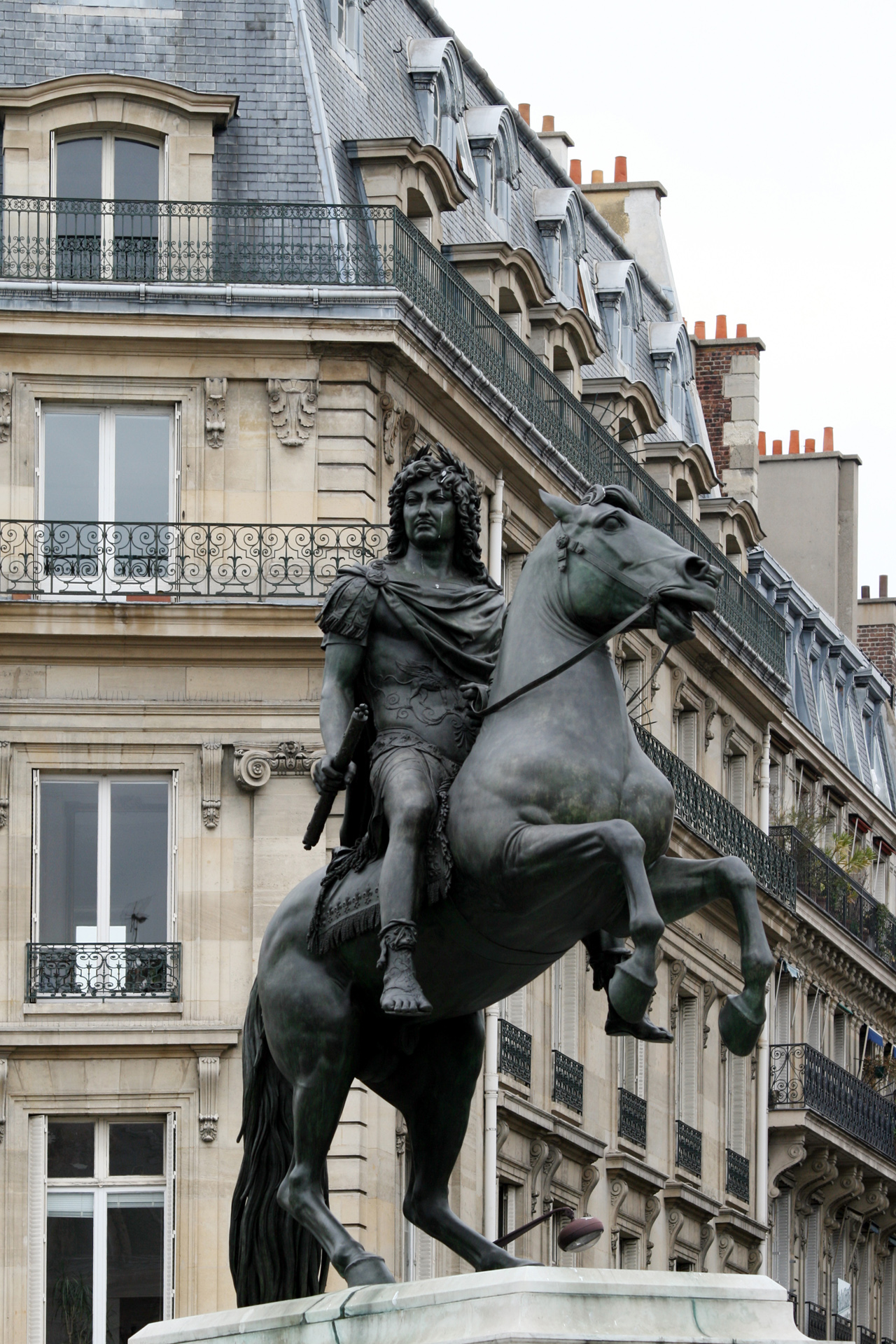
Roman equestrian statue of Louis XIV at the centre of the square

Hardouin-Mansart's design, of 1685, articulated the square's unified façades according to a formula utilised in some Parisian hôtels particuliers (palatial private homes). Mansart chose colossal pilasters linking two floors, standing on a high arcaded base with rustication of the pilasters; the façades were capped with sloping slate "mansard roofs", punctuated by dormer windows. However, because the building work was incomplete at the time of the unveiling of the monument, the envisioned façades were painted on canvas. By 1692, the Place des Victoires was pierced by six streets, and the circular plan functioned as a flexible joint to harmonise their various axes.

=== Desjardins sculpture ===
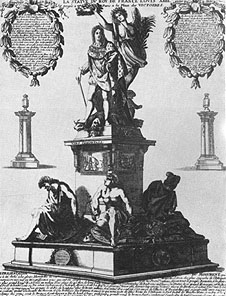
Desjardins's monument

The original statue, of Louis XIV crowned by Victory and trampling Cerberus underfoot, in gilt bronze, stood on a high square pedestal with bas-relief panels and effusively flattering inscriptions; dejected bronze figures were seated at the corners. The sculptor was Martin Desjardins, part of the team that was working cooperatively at the Palace of Versailles and its gardens.

=== Louis XIV's reversals ===
Louis permanently abandoned Paris in 1682, and his imperial ambitions in Europe were deflated by subsequent wars; the Treaty of Ryswick of 1697 was termed "a humiliating disaster for the king" by the military architect Vauban. "During the course of the eighteenth century," Rochelle Ziskin has noted, "critics would suggest that the arrogance of representation at the Place des Victoires had serious political consequences and may have been a factor in provoking war." The grandiose memorial that had begun to embarrass Louis XIV himself would eventually be destroyed in 1792, during the French Revolution.

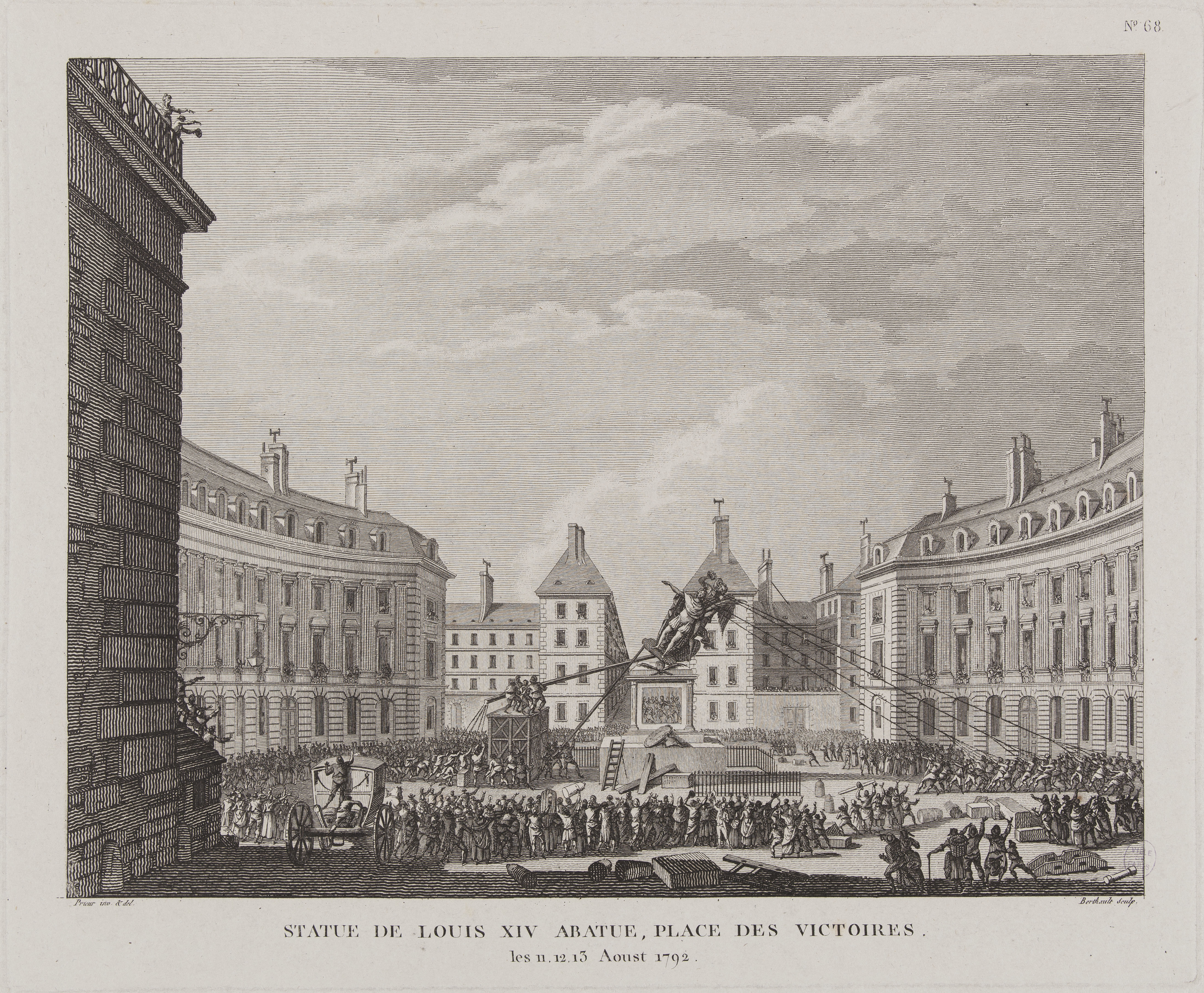
Toppling of the statue of Louis XIV in 1792

=== Modern times ===
In 1793, the Place was renamed Place des Victoires-Nationales (National Victories Square), and a wooden pyramid was erected on the site of the destroyed statue. In 1810, under the rule of Napoleon, a nude statue of the General Louis Desaix replaced the pyramid. However, following the abdication of Napoléon, the statue was taken down and its metal was used to create a new statue of Henry IV on the nearby Pont Neuf.

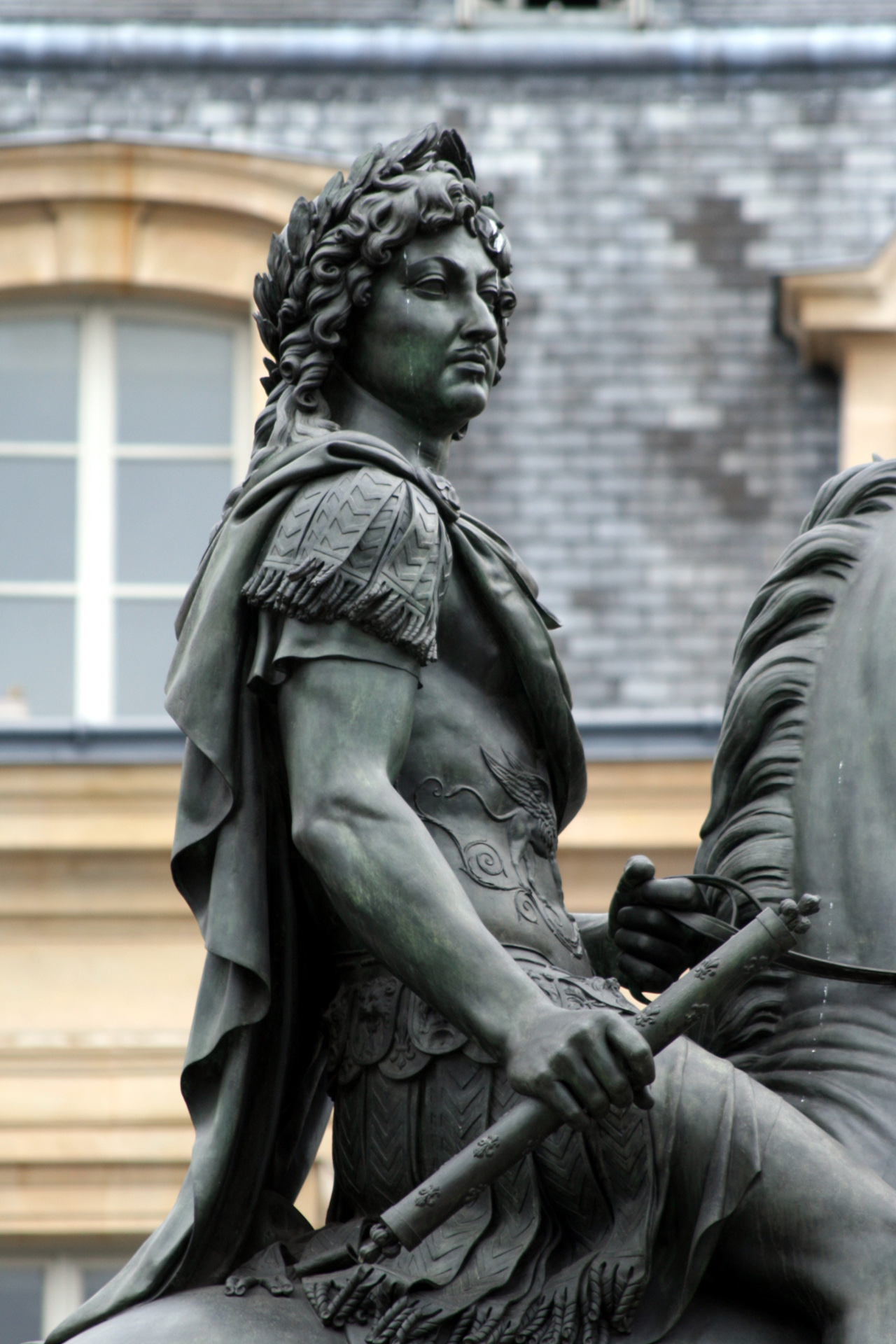
Bosio's Louis XIV

In 1828, the restored Bourbon king, Charles X, commissioned the current equestrian statue, which was sculpted by François Joseph Bosio in imitation of the famous Bronze Horseman. Louis XIV, dressed as a Roman emperor, sits on a proud horse rearing on its hind legs. An iron fence encircles the twelve-metre-high monument.

== The square today ==
Map

The area surrounding the Place des Victoires is now an upmarket Rive Droite neighbourhood. Fashion designers Kenzo and Cacharel have boutiques there, as have the ready-to-wear chains Maje, and Zadig et Voltaire. The German Forum for Art History (Deutsches Forum für Kunstgeschichte) is on the square and the French Institut national d'histoire de l'art is in nearby Galerie Colbert.

== Métro stations ==
The Place des Victoires is:

Located near the Métro stations: Bourse, Pyramides and Étienne Marcel.

It is served by lines 3, 4, 7, and 14.
