= Quartier du Palais-Royal =

Coordinates: 48.863154°N 2.3370746°E

Palais-Royal
- Quartier du Palais-Royal
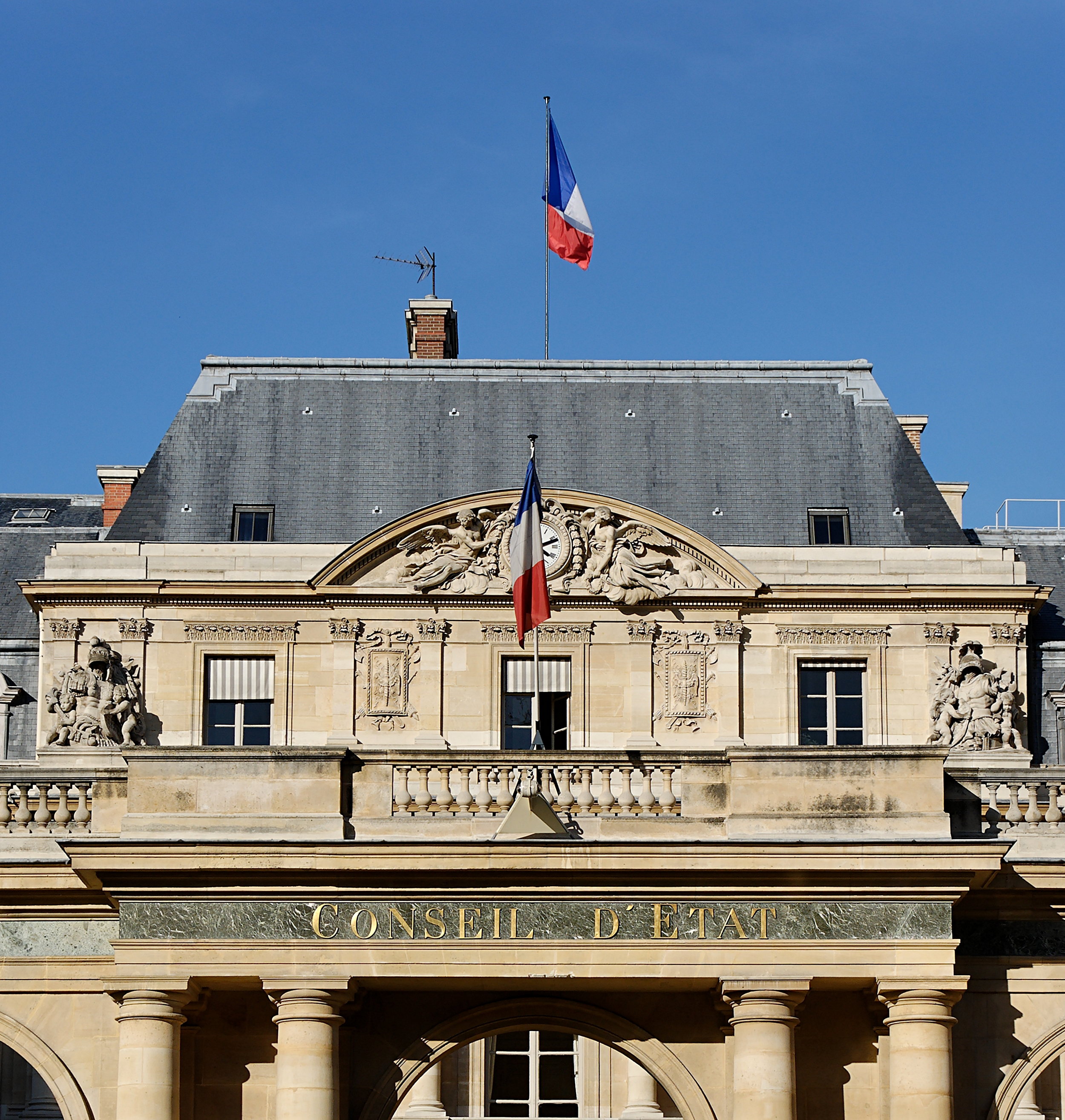
- Conseil d'État
- Interactive map of Palais-Royal
- Country: France
- Region: Île-de-France
- Ville: Paris
- Arrondissement: 1st

Area
  - Total: 0.274 km^{2} (0.106 sq mi)

Population (2016)
  - Total: 3,240
  - Density: 11,825/km^{2} (30,630/sq mi)

The Quartier du Palais-Royal is the third administrative district of Paris, forming part of the 1st arrondissement. Covering an area of 27.4 hectares, it is bounded by Rue de Rivoli to the south, Rue Saint-Roch to the west, Rue des Petits-Champs and Rue de la Feuillade to the north, and Rue Croix-des-Petits-Champs to the east.

The district takes its name from the vast palace commissioned by Cardinal Richelieu between 1627 and 1629, which he bequeathed to the royal family upon his death—hence the name Palais-Royal. The palace, which serves as the natural center of the district, currently houses the Comédie-Française and Théâtre du Palais-Royal theaters, as well as state institutions such as the Ministry of Culture, the Constitutional Council, and the Conseil d'État.

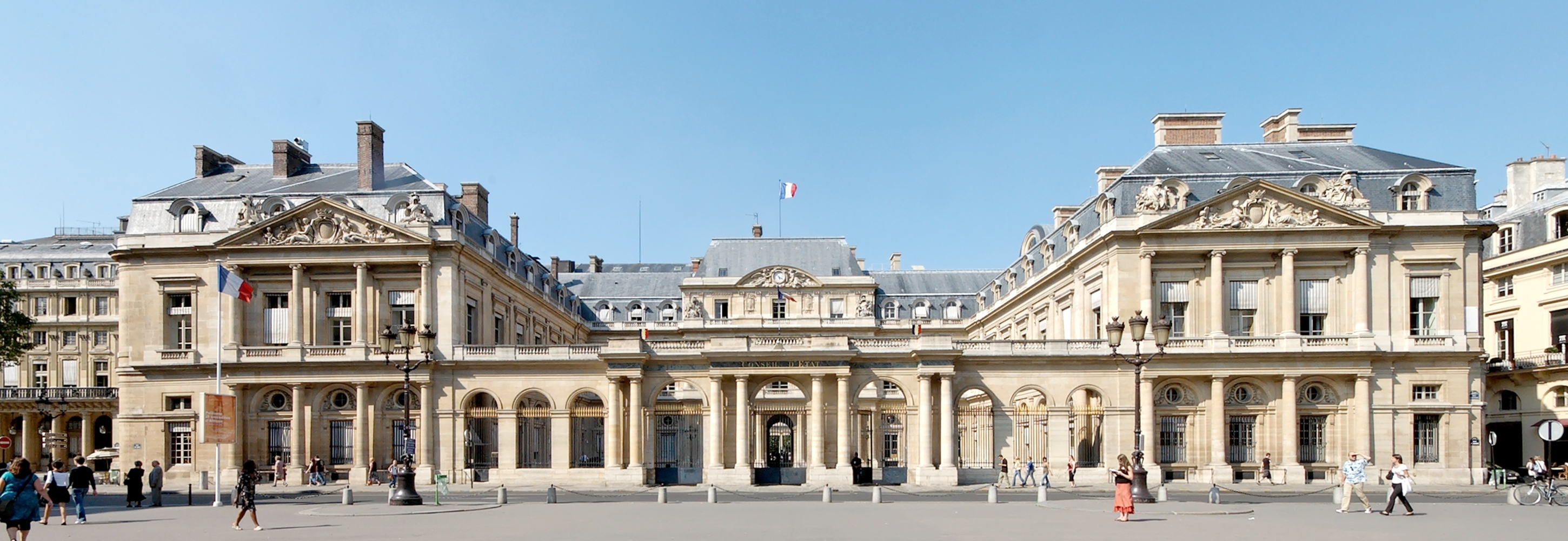
Main entrance to the Palais Royal

Quarters of the 1st Arrondissement
