= Quartier Gaillon =

Coordinates: 48.8693146°N 2.3347338°E

Gaillon
- Quartier Gaillon
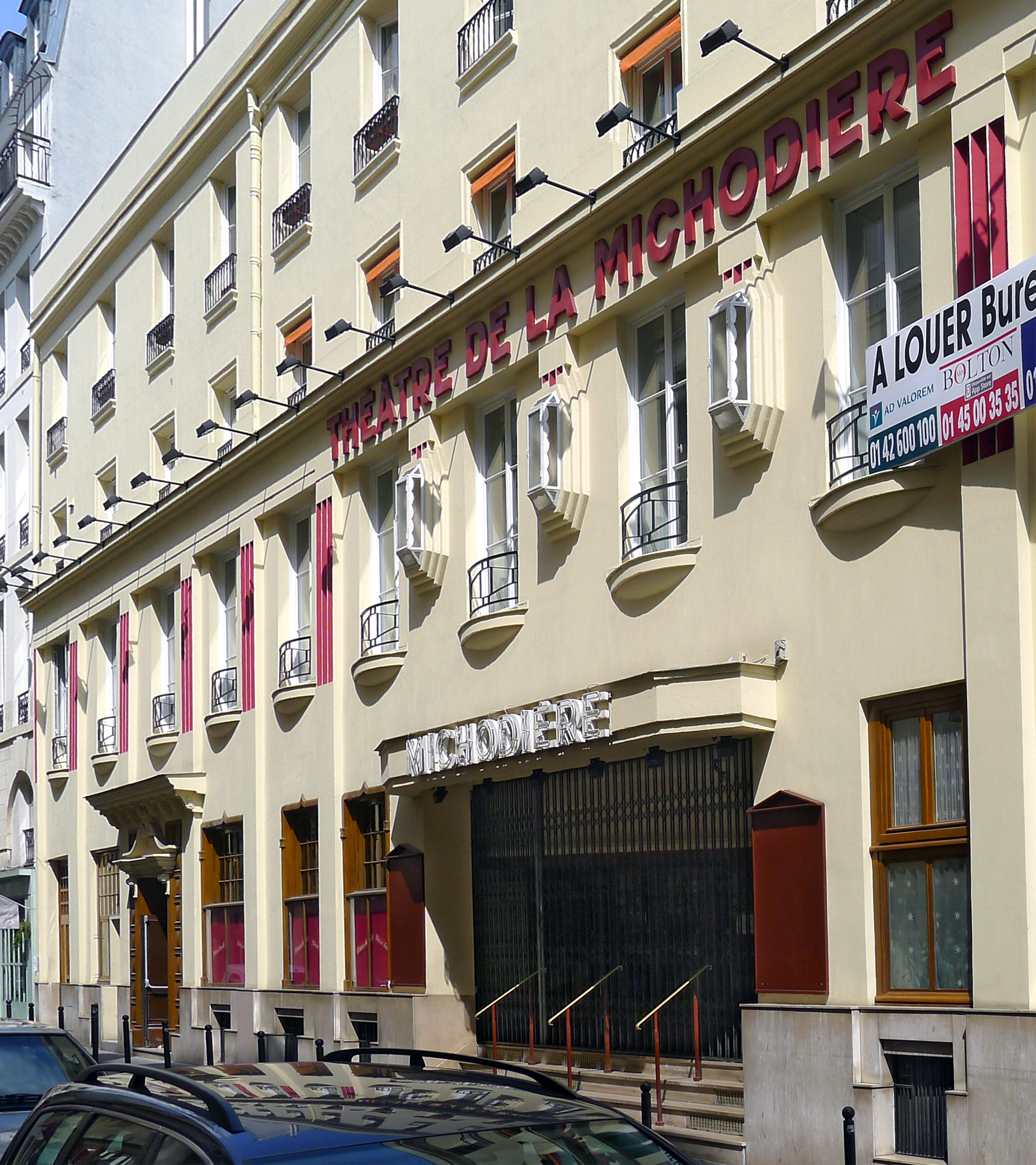
- Théâtre de la Michodière
- Interactive map of Gaillon
- Country: France
- Region: Île-de-France
- Ville: Paris
- Arrondissement: 2nd

Area
  - Total: 0.188 km^{2} (0.073 sq mi)

Population (2016)
  - Total: 1,456
  - Density: 7,745/km^{2} (20,060/sq mi)

The Quartier Gaillon is the fifth administrative neighborhood of Paris and is located in the 2nd arrondissement. It is simultaneously the smallest and the least populous of all the neighborhoods in the capital.

== Boundaries ==
The streets bounding the neighborhood are the Boulevards des Italiens and des Capucines to the north, Rue Sainte-Anne and Rue de Gramont to the east, and Rue des Petits-Champs and Rue Danielle Casanova to the south.

== Location and monuments ==
The neighborhood has an area of 18.8 hectares.

The quarters of the 2nd arrondissement

== Related articles ==
- 2nd arrondissement of Paris
- Quarters of Paris
