= François d'Aubusson de La Feuillade =

French military officer and noble

François d'Aubusson, Comte de La Feuillade, leur-dit 6th duc de Roannais aka duc de La Feuillade
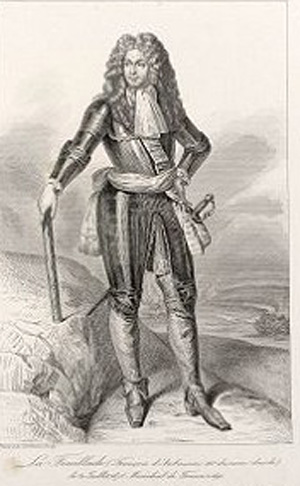
- François d'Aubusson, Comte de la Feuillade

Governor of the Dauphiné
- In office May 1681 – September 1691

Personal details
- Born: 21 April 1631 Courpalay, Île-de-France
- Died: 19 September 1691 (aged 60) Paris
- Resting place: Saint-Eustache Cemetery, Paris
- Spouse: Charlotte de Gouffier (1667 to 1683)
- Children: Louis-Joseph-George (1670–1680); Marie-Theresa (1671–1692); Louis d'Aubusson de La Feuillade (1673–1725)
- Parent(s): François II, Comte de La Feuillade (ca 1590 to 1632); Isabeau Brachet de Pérusse
- Occupation: Landowner and soldier
- Awards: Order of the Holy Spirit

Military service
- Allegiance: France
- Rank: Marshal of France
- Unit: Commander of the Gardes Francaises 1672–1691
- Battles/wars: Fronde 1648–1653; Rethel; Faubourg St Antoine; Franco-Spanish War (1635–1659); Arras; Valenciennes; Austro-Turkish War; Saint Gotthard; War of Devolution; Franco-Dutch War; Siege of Besançon

François d'Aubusson de La Feuillade, known as 6th duc de Roannais (1631–1691) was a French military officer and noble who served in the wars of Louis XIV and became a Marshal of France. He was also responsible for initiating the design and construction of the Place des Victoires, one of modern Paris' most famous landmarks.

== Personal details ==
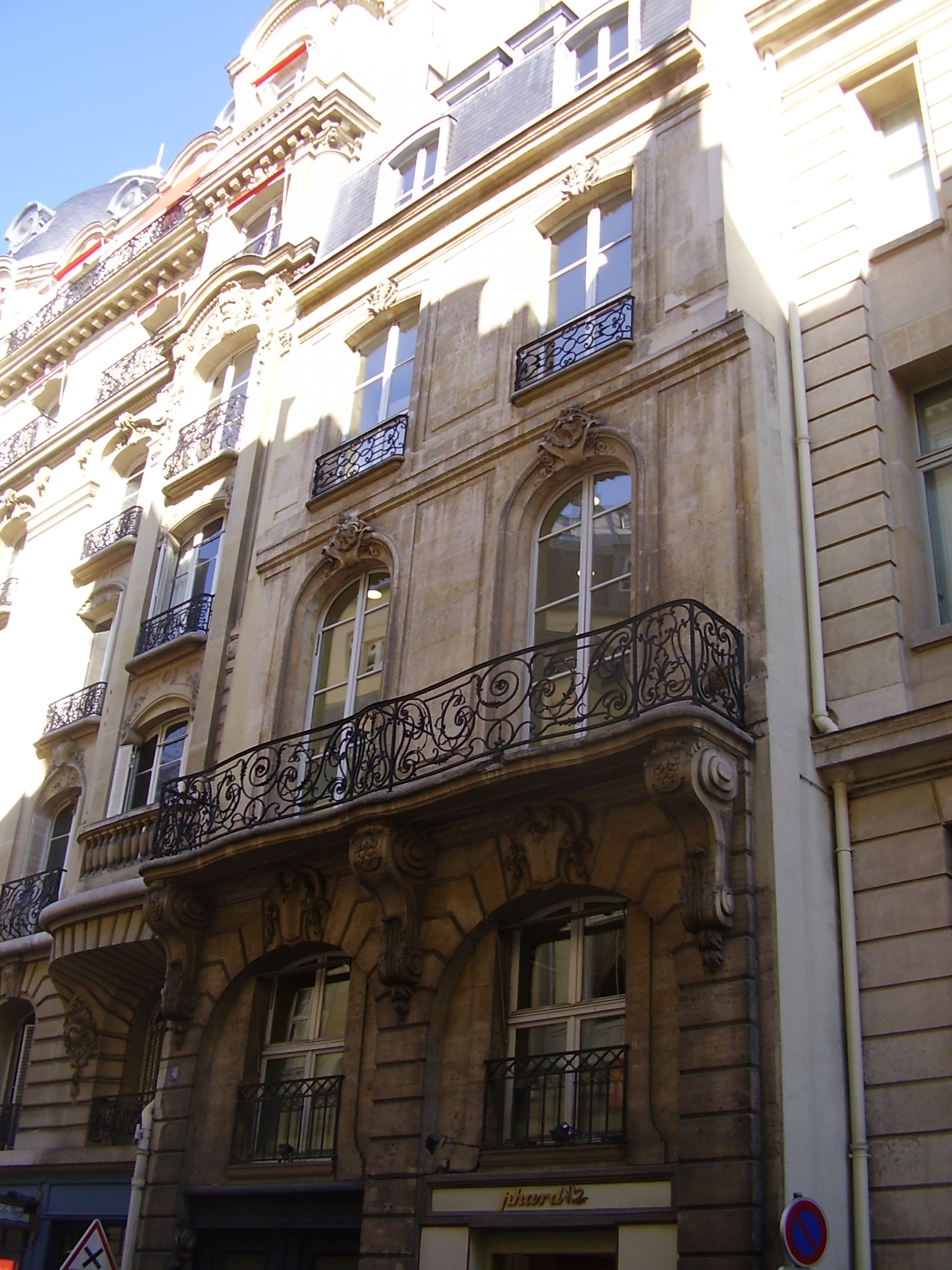
Hôtel de La Feuillade, Paris modern-day

François d'Aubusson de La Feuillade was born on 21 April 1631 at Courpalay in the Île-de-France near Paris, fifth and last son of François II, Comte de La Feuillade (ca 1590 to 1632) and Isabeau Brachet de Pérusse. The d'Aubussons were a prominent and well connected family; Pierre d'Aubusson (1423–1503), was Grand Master of the Knights Hospitaller and his elder brother Antoine an advisor to both Charles VII and Louis XI.

François' father and eldest brother Leon (? to 1648) were senior aides to Gaston, Duke of Orléans, heir to the French throne until the birth of Louis XIV in 1638. He had another three brothers, Georges (1609–1697), later Bishop of Metz, Gabriel-Bratchet (? to 1638) and Paul (1622–1646). Of his five sisters, Elizabeth (1624–1704) became Abbess of Sainte-Marie de la Règle in 1679; little is known of the others, who all appear to have become nuns.

In April 1667, Artus de Gouffier (1627–1696), 5th duke of Roannais, assigned his titles and property to La Feuillade in return for a payment of 400,000 French livres, and marriage to his sister Charlotte (? – 1683). He and Charlotte had three children before her death in 1683; Louis-Joseph-George (1670–1680), Marie-Theresa (1671–1692) and Louis d'Aubusson de La Feuillade (1673–1725). After renouncing his titles, de Gouffier entered a monastery and during his lifetime, François was officially known as 'leur-dit 6th duke of Roannais'; since he survived until 1696, it was only then that his son Louis officially assumed the title.

== Career ==
The first half of the 17th century in France was a period of intense civil strife; the 1590 Edict of Nantes ended the French Wars of Religion but continued state persecution caused a series of Huguenot rebellions in the 1620s. This was followed by the Franco-Spanish War (1635–1659), accompanied by a struggle for power during the minority of Louis XIV that led to the 1648–1653 civil wars known as the Fronde. Their impact can be seen in the history of de La Feuillade's immediate family; his father was killed in 1632 at Castelnaudary and three of his brothers died in battle, Leon at Lens in 1648, Gabriel-Brachet at Saint-Omer in 1638 and Paul at Mardyck in 1646.

He began his military career in 1649, as captain in a regiment commanded by the Duke of Orléans; during the 1650–1653 Fronde des nobles, he and his brother Georges remained loyal to the party led by Louis XIV's mother, Anne of Austria and Cardinal Mazarin. He was wounded in the Royalist victories of Rethel in December 1650 and the Battle of the Faubourg St Antoine in July 1652, which ended the Fronde as a serious military threat, although Condé and a few supporters fought on in alliance with the Spanish.

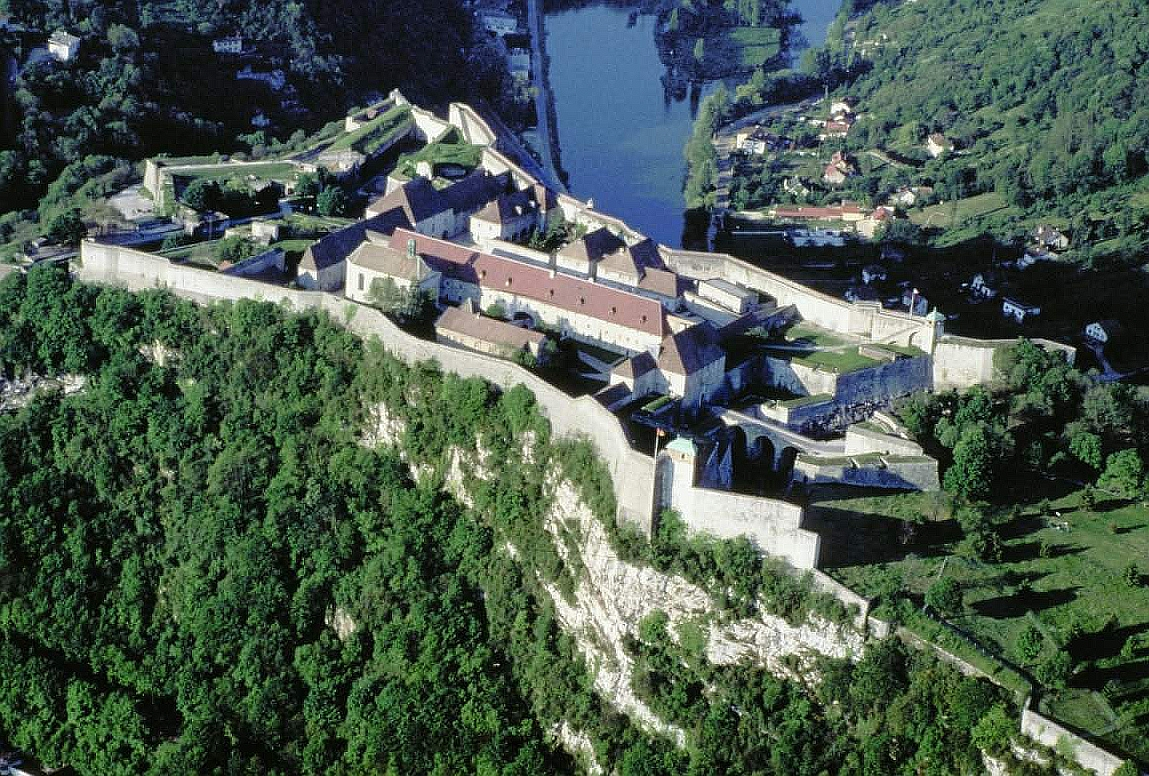
The Citadel of Besançon; de la Feuillade personally led an assault against this during the Siege of Besançon in May 1674

The Spanish took advantage of the Fronde to recover some of the territory lost after their defeat at Rocroi in 1643 and the Franco-Spanish War now resumed. De la Feuillade participated in a number of actions, including Arras in 1654; he was wounded and captured at Valenciennes, a French defeat by a Spanish army under Condé. When the war ended with the 1659 Treaty of the Pyrenees, de la Feuillade was Governor of Crozet, near the modern Swiss border. He joined the French contingent under Jean de Coligny sent by Louis to support Austria in the 1663–1664 Austro-Turkish War and fought in the August 1664 victory of Saint Gotthard.

During the 1667–1668 War of Devolution with Spain, de la Feuillade was in the army under de Rochebaron that captured the towns of Bergues, Veurne and Courtrai/Kortrijk between June and July. When it ended, he was part of a French expeditionary force sent to the Venetian-occupied island of Crete, which had been besieged by the Ottomans since 1648; French troops were withdrawn in August 1669, shortly before the island surrendered in September. He was appointed Colonel of the Gardes Francaises when the Franco-Dutch War began in 1672, he fought in the Netherlands and various other theatres, including Franche-Comté in 1674, when he led an assault during the Siege of Besançon and took Salins-les-Bains on 22 June. He was rewarded by being made Marshal of France in 1675 and military Governor of Dole, regional capital of Franche-Comté until it moved to Besançon in 1676.

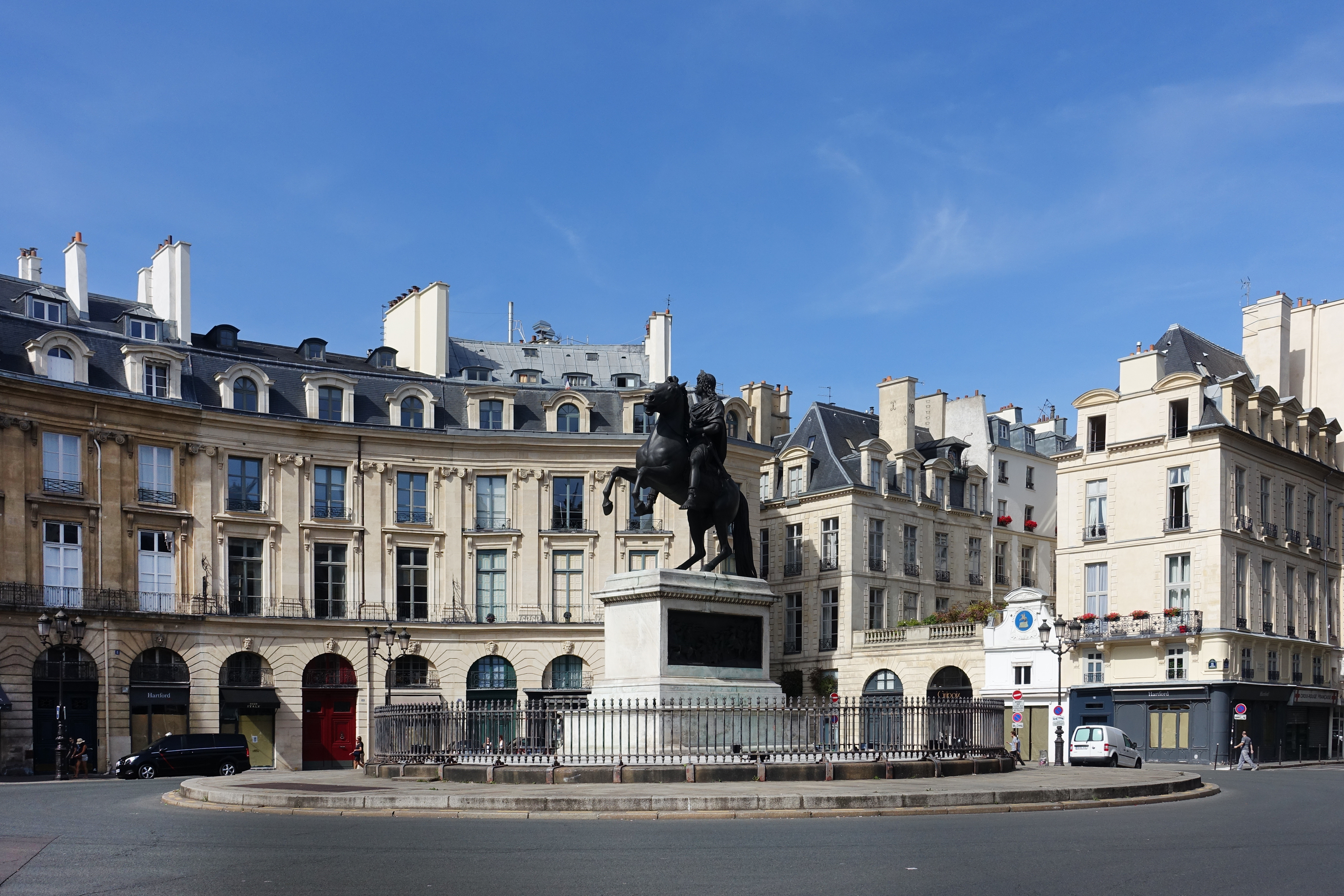
The Place des Victoires; the statue of Louis XIV was installed in 1825

In 1675, he was appointed Marshal of France in 1675 and military Governor of Dole, regional capital of Franche-Comté until it moved to Besançon in 1676. On 28 February 1678, he replaced Vivonne as French Viceroy in Messina, Sicily, whose 1674 revolt against their Spanish rulers had been backed by Louis XIV. By the end of 1677, increasing pressure on resources elsewhere meant he decided to withdraw troops from Messina, a process completed by de la Feuillade on 13 March. On returning to France, he took these troops to Roussillon, in support of the siege of Puigcerdà.

The 1678-1679 Treaties of Nijmegen ended the Franco-Dutch War and de la Feuillade's military career, although he retained his position as Colonel of the Gardes Francaises. Following the death of the duc de Lesdiguières in May 1681, he was appointed Governor of the Dauphiné but apart from this, he devoted the rest of his life to building the Place des Victoires. The square formed the centre of an ambitious building project, which included a number of private residences, among them the Hôtel de La Feuillade; he was ruined by the enormous cost, estimated at over seven million livres, and the work was not completed until 1696, five years after his death.

He died on 19 September 1691 and was buried at Saint-Eustache, one of the cemeteries whose contents were later transferred to the Catacombs of Paris in 1787.

== Legacy ==
De la Feuillade Coat of arms; D'or à la croix ancrée de gueules

To celebrate the end of the Franco-Dutch War, de la Feuillade funded the design and construction of the Place des Victoires, which was completed in 1686 by Jules Hardouin-Mansart, Superintendent of Royal Buildings, also responsible for Les Invalides and the Place Vendôme. The centre of the square contained a statue of Louis XIV, with a much smaller one of de la Feuillade himself elsewhere; both were destroyed in 1792 during the French Revolution, the current monument being a replacement installed in 1828. Rue La Feuillade, a short street off Place des Victoires, is named after him.

He also resurrected a scheme originally proposed by the 15th century merchant Jacques Cœur to make the River Loire navigable from Roanne to its exit point into the Atlantic Ocean) at Saint-Nazaire. Until the advent of railways, goods and supplies were largely transported by water; the scheme would enhance the economy of Roanne, which had been damaged by the expulsion of the Huguenots following the 1685 Edict of Fontainebleau and towns along the route and provide an alternative to export routes along the Scheldt then dominated by the Dutch.

In his Mémoires written in the 1720s, Saint-Simon (1675–1755) dismisses François as someone who gained their status through flattery and subservience. The accuracy of this is hard to assess; Saint-Simon was 16 when François died in 1691 and uniformly hostile to Louis XIV and his supporters, the majority of whom he dismissed as commoners.

== Sources ==
- Anselme, Augustin Dechauffé (1750). Histoire de la Maison Royale de France, et des grands officiers de la Couronne, Volume V. Compagnie des Libraires.;
- Black, Jeremy (2009). The Cambridge Illustrated Atlas of Warfare: Renaissance to Revolution; Volume 2. Cambridge University Press. ISBN 978-0521470339.
- De Bouhours, Pere (1806). Histoire de P. d'Aubusson-La-Feuillade, Grand Maître de Rhodes (in French) (4th ed.). La Compagnie de Jesus.
- De Périni, Hardÿ (1896). Batailles françaises, Volume V (in French). Ernest Flammarion, Paris.
- Dubois, Isabelle; Gady, Alexandre (2003). Place des Victoires: Histoire, architecture, société (in French). Maison des Sciences de l'Homme. ISBN 978-2735110032.
- Lefrançois, Philippe (1950). Paris souterrain, coll. Encyclopédie pittoresque (in French). Les Éditions internationales.
- Mason, Norman (1972). The War of Candia, 1645-1669 (Thesis). LSU.
- Moreri, Louis (1749). Le grand dictionnaire historique ou Le melange curieux de l'Histoire sacrée; Volume I. Libraires Associes.
- Nolan, Cathal (2009). Wars of the Age of Louis XIV, 1650–1715: An Encyclopedia of Global Warfare and Civilization. Greenwood. ISBN 978-0313330469.
- Popoff, Michel; Pinoteau, Hervé (1996). Armorial de l'ordre du Saint-Esprit (in French). Le Léopard d'or. ISBN 2-86377-140-X.
- Saint Simon, Louis, duc de (1988). Saint-Simon. Mémoires (1711–1714); Additions au Journal de Dangeau (in French). Editions Gallimard.
- Tucker, Spencer C (2009). A Global Chronology of Conflict: From the Ancient World to the Modern Middle East 6V: A Global Chronology of Conflict [6 volumes]. ABC-CLIO. ISBN 978-1851096671.
- Woolley, Richard; Besongne, Nicolas (1687). The present state of France. Gilbert Cownely.

Military offices
Preceded by Antoine de Gramont	Colonel of the Gardes Francaises; 1672–1691	Succeeded by Louis-François de Boufflers
Preceded by François Emmanuel de Créquy de Bonne, 4th duc de Lesdiguières	Governor of La Dauphiné; 1681–1691	Succeeded by Louis d'Aubusson de La Feuillade
French nobility
Preceded by Artus de Gouffier	leur-dit 6th duke of Roannais; 1667–1691	Succeeded by Louis d'Aubusson de La Feuillade
Preceded by Leon d'Aubusson de La Feuillade	Comte de la Feuillade; 1648–1691	Succeeded by Louis d'Aubusson de La Feuillade
