= Louis d'Aubusson de La Feuillade =

French military officer and courtier

Louis d'Aubusson, Comte de La Feuillade
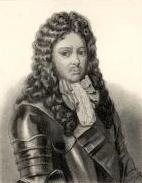
- 1702 Engraving of de La Feuillade

Governor of La Dauphiné
- In office 1691–1719

Personal details
- Born: 30 March 1673 Marly-le-Roi, Île-de-France
- Died: 29 January 1725 (aged 51) Marly-le-Roi, Île-de-France
- Resting place: Couvent des Théatins, Paris
- Spouse(s): (1) Charlotte-Thérèse de la Vrilliere (1692-1697) (2) Marie Thérèse Chamillart (1701-1716)
- Awards: Chevalier, Order of Saint Louis

Military service
- Allegiance: France
- Years of service: 1688–1706
- Rank: Marshal of France
- Battles/wars: Nine Years War; Philippsburg; Walcourt; Fleurus; Landen; Siege of Charleroi; War of the Spanish Succession; Nice; Siege of Turin

Louis d'Aubusson de la Feuillade (30 March 1673 – 28 January 1725) was a French military officer and courtier who fought in the Nine Years War and the War of the Spanish Succession, eventually attaining the rank of Marshal of France.

== Personal details ==
Louis d'Aubusson de la Feuillade, 7th duc de Roannais, was born on 30 March 1673, in Marly-le-Roi, near the Royal summer palace of Château de Marly. Used by Louis XIV to escape the elaborate ceremonial of the Versailles court, residence there was a sign of high favour. His father François d'Aubusson de La Feuillade (1631-1691) was also a soldier and courtier, while his paternal uncle Georges d'Aubusson de La Feuillade (1609-1697) was Bishop of Metz.

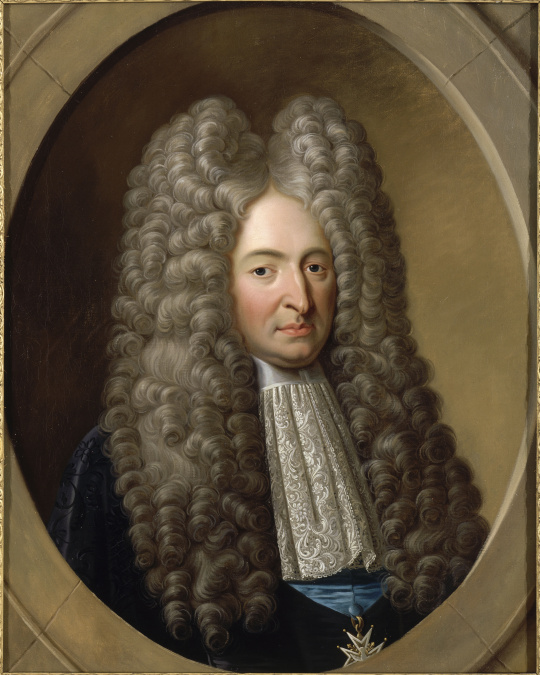
Michel Chamillart, Minister of War and de la Feuillade's father-in-law, whose influence was crucial to the latter's career

His mother, Charlotte de Gouffier, was sister and heir to Artus de Gouffier (1627-1696), 5th duke of Roannais and a close friend of writer, mathematician and Catholic theologian Blaise Pascal. Artus entered a monastery in 1667, assigning his titles and property to François de la Feuillade, in return for 400,000 livres and an agreement to marry Charlotte. Artus outlived his father and until his death in 1696, Louis d'Aubusson was known as 'leur-dit 7th duke of Roannais' or 'duke of La Feuillade.'

He was married twice, first in 1692 to Charlotte-Thérèse de la Vrilliere (1675-1697), then in 1701 to Marie Thérèse Chamillart (1685-1716), daughter of Michel Chamillart, Minister for War. Both marriages were childless and the title of duke became extinct on his death in 1725.

== Career ==
In 1688, La Feuillade raised a cavalry regiment for the Nine Years' War, which fought at Walcourt, Fleurus and Landen. The first of the controversies that accompanied his career occurred after Landen, when it was claimed he disappeared during the battle, only re-emerging at the end. The accusation was serious enough for him to write a letter denying it to his first father-in-law, the Marquis de Chateauneuf.

A few years later, following the death in 1697 of his uncle, Georges de La Feuillade, Bishop of Metz, a review of the diocese financial records showed a large sum of money was missing. The report concluded La Feuillade had stolen it while visiting his uncle, and Louis XIV had to be dissuaded from dismissing him from the army by Louis de Pontchartrain, a friend of his father-in-law.

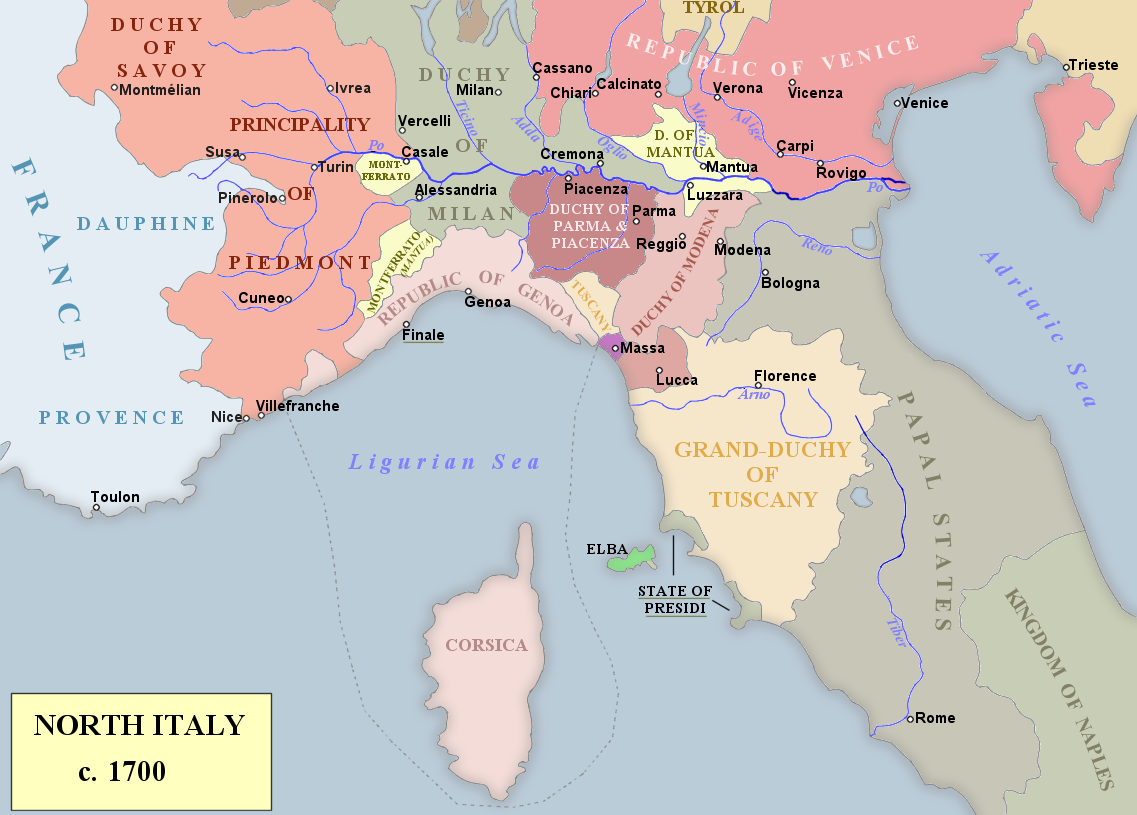
Northern Italy; from 1702 to 1706, Milan and Savoy were the primary areas of conflict

When the Treaty of Ryswick ended the war in 1697, La Feuillade's regiment was disbanded; despite his record, he was reinstated as a brigadier in 1702 during the War of the Spanish Succession. He was promoted Marechal de camp in 1703 and posted to the French army in Italy, allegedly due to the influence of Michel Chamillart, the Minister of War, who became his father-in-law in 1701. He was not well regarded by his contemporaries, some of whom described him as having a "heart corrupted through and through" and a "soul of mud".

Victor Amadeus II, ruler of Savoy, began the war as an ally of France but switched sides in October 1703. La Feuillade was appointed deputy to Vendôme, French commander in Italy, who gave him responsibility for occupying Villefranche and the County of Savoy, now part of modern-day France. Largely complete by the end of 1705, the primary objective in 1706 was to capture Victor Amadeus' capital of Turin; with an army of 48,000, La Feuillade initiated the siege on 12 May, although it was not completely cut off until 19 June.

As was customary, Turin's defences were divided into the outer 'City,' containing the residential and commercial areas, and the 'Citadel' at its core. La Feuillade and Vendôme proposed digging trenches around the City at a distance of 300–400 metres, then blasting the Citadel into submission, an approach known as the 'Coehoorn method', after the Dutch engineer, Menno van Coehoorn. However, the Citadel's defences had been extensively updated since 1696, using designs provided by Vauban, the French military engineer, and much of it was now underground. Vauban therefore recommended they take the City first, allowing their artillery to target the base of the Citadel's walls. When his advice was ignored, Vauban allegedly offered to have his throat cut if Turin were captured using this approach. De la Feuillade was also criticised for spending much of his time chasing Victor Amadeus, who had escaped from Turin with 6,000 cavalry.

The French position in Italy changed with their defeat at Ramillies on 23 May. As a result, Vendôme was sent to Northern France in July and Philippe II, Duke of Orléans assumed command in Italy, advised by Marshal Ferdinand de Marsin. Orléans joined La Feuillade at Turin and their combined forces assaulted the city three times between 27 August and 3 September, each one repulsed with heavy loss. The Siege of Turin ended in September when a relief force under Prince Eugene broke the French siege lines near Collegno.

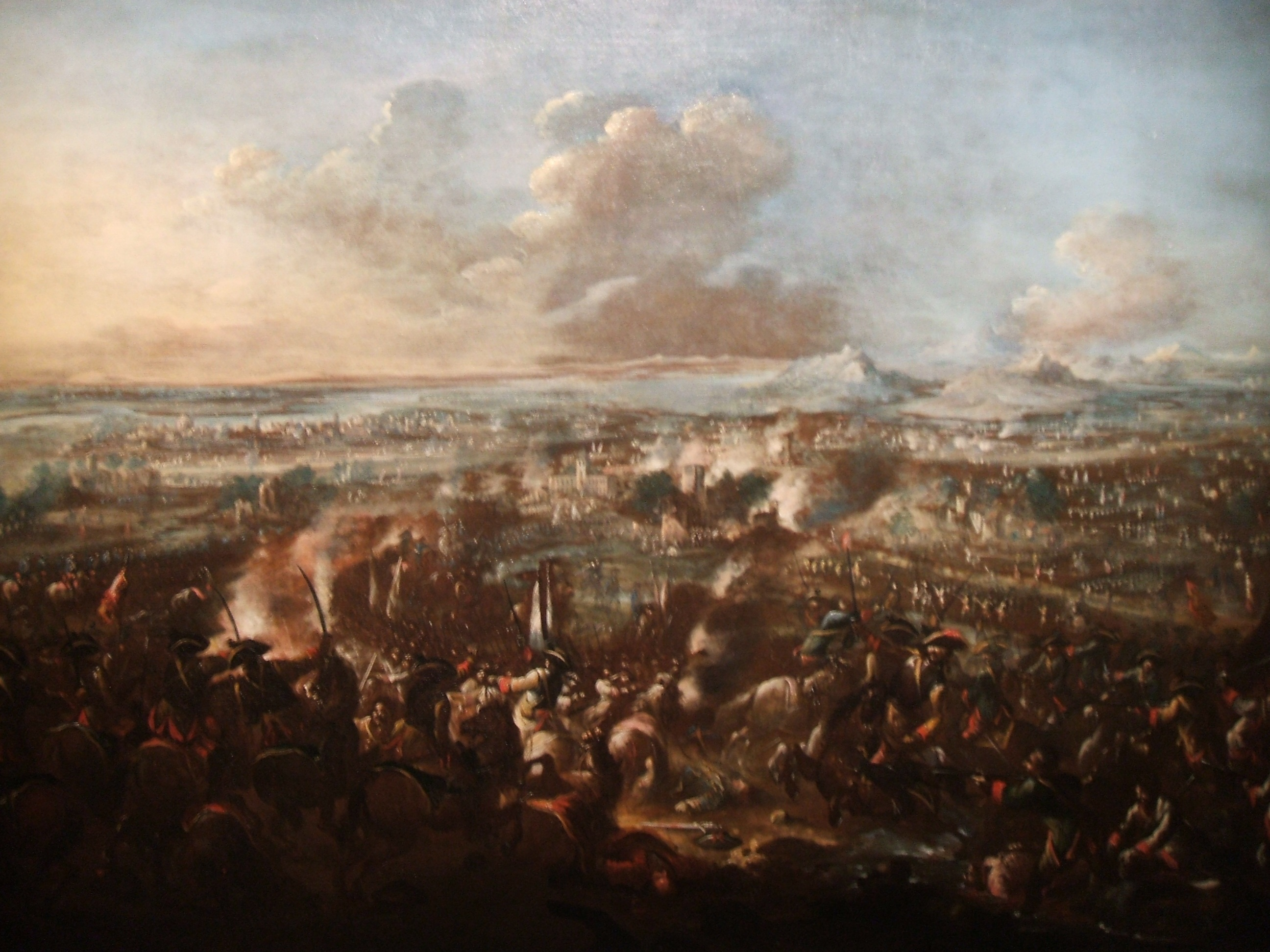
Siege of Turin September 1706; the Allies break the siege, ending the war in Italy and La Feuillade's career

With France's northern border under pressure after Ramillies, Louis XIV needed to end the war in Italy and in March 1707, he agreed the Convention of Milan with Emperor Joseph. To the fury of Joseph's allies, the French withdrew their remaining garrisons, ceding control of Milan and Mantua to Austria but in return were given free passage to France, allowing them to be redeployed in other theatres.

Defeat at Turin ended de la Feuillade's active military career, although he was made Marshal of France in 1724. In 1719, his long-standing office of Governor of the Dauphiné was transferred to Duke of Orléans, and he rejected the post of Ambassador to the Vatican offered in its place. He died in January 1725, and was buried in the Couvent des Théatins in Paris, demolished in 1825. The title 'Duke of Roannais' died with de la Feuillade, but his other titles and lands passed to his cousin Jacques d'Aubusson.

== Sources ==
- Anselme, Augustin Dechauffé; Du Forny (1750). Histoire de la Maison Royale de France, et des grands officiers de la Couronne Volume V. Compagnie des Libraires.
- Duffy, Christopher (1985). The Fortress in the Age of Vauban and Frederick the Great 1660-1789 (2017 ed.). Routledge. ISBN 1138924644.
- Chapman, Sara (2004). Private Ambition and Political Alliances in Louis XIV's Government. University of Rochester Press. ISBN 1-58046-153-0.
- Czech, Kenneth P (2006). "War of the Spanish Succession; Battle of Turin". HistoryNet.
- Falkner, James (2015). The War of the Spanish Succession 1701-1714. Pen and Sword. ISBN 978-1473872905.
- Lynn, John (1999). The Wars of Louis XIV 1667-1714. Longman. ISBN 0582056292.
- Moreri, Louis (1749). Le grand dictionnaire historique ou Le melange curieux de l'Histoire sacrée; Volume I. Libraires Associes, Paris.
- Saint Simon, Louis de Rouvray (1879). Boislisle, Arthur Andre (ed.). Memoires de Saint-Simon (in French). Hatchette et Cie, Paris.
- Sundstrom, Roy A (1992). Sidney Godolphin: Servant of the State. EDS Publications Ltd. ISBN 0874134382.
- Symcox, Geoffrey (1983). Victor Amadeus II: Absolutism in the Savoyard State, 1675-1730. University of California Press. ISBN 0520049748.

French nobility
Preceded by François d'Aubusson de La Feuillade	Duke of Roannais; 1691–1725	Extinct
Preceded by François d'Aubusson de La Feuillade	Comte de la Feuillade; 1691–1725	Succeeded by Jacques d'Aubusson

Military offices
Preceded by François d'Aubusson de La Feuillade	Governor of La Dauphiné; 1691–1719	Succeeded by Louis, later Duke of Orléans
