= La Feuillade =

- Commune
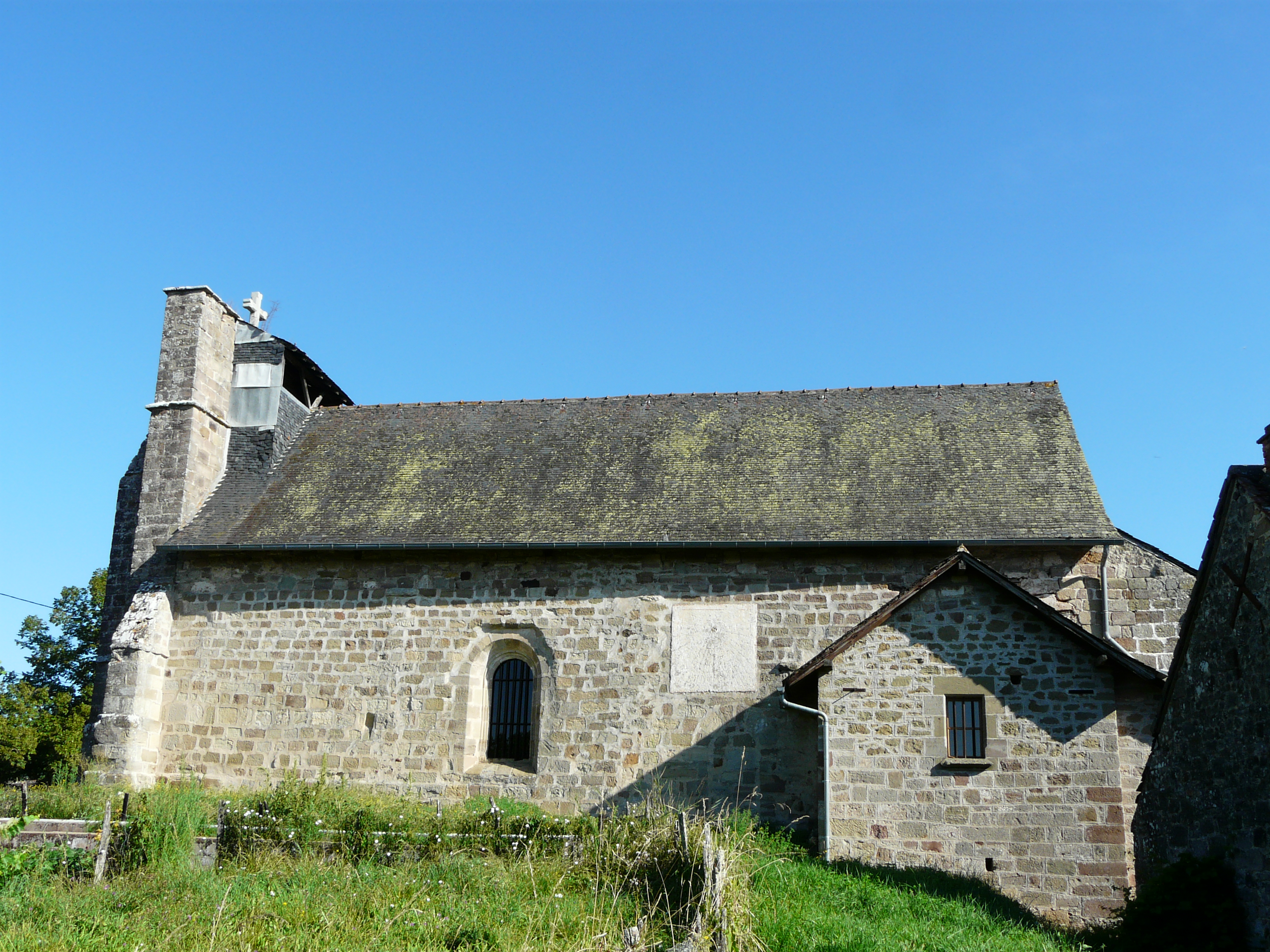
- The church in La Feuillade
- Location of La Feuillade
- Location within France Location within Nouvelle-Aquitaine
- Coordinates: 45°06′53″N 1°24′13″E
- Country: France
- Region: Nouvelle-Aquitaine
- Department: Dordogne
- Arrondissement: Sarlat-la-Canéda
- Canton: Terrasson-Lavilledieu
- Intercommunality: Terrassonnais en Périgord Noir Thenon Hautefort

Government
  - Mayor (2020–2026): Daniel Baril
- Area^{1}: 3.97 km^{2} (1.53 sq mi)
- Elevation: 160 m (520 ft)
- Highest elevation: 322 m (1,056 ft)
- Lowest elevation: 89 m (292 ft)
- Population (2023): 820
  - Density: 210/km^{2} (530/sq mi)
- Time zone: UTC+01:00 (CET)
  - Summer (DST): UTC+02:00 (CEST)
- INSEE/Postal code: 24179 /24120
- ^{1} French Land Register data, which excludes lakes, ponds, glaciers > 1 km^{2} (0.386 sq mi or 247 acres) and river estuaries.

La Feuillade (French pronunciation: [la fœjad]; Occitan: La Fuelhada) is a commune in the Dordogne department in Nouvelle-Aquitaine in southwestern France.

== Population ==
Historical population
Year	Pop.	±% p.a.
1968	328	—
1975	417	+3.49%
1982	519	+3.18%
1990	568	+1.13%
1999	710	+2.51%
2007	756	+0.79%
2012	746	−0.27%
2017	732	−0.38%
2023	820	+1.91%
Source: INSEE

== See also ==
- Communes of the Dordogne department
