= Quartier du Père-Lachaise =

Coordinates: 48.861480712890625°N 2.393434762954712°E

Père-Lachaise
- Quartier du Père-Lachaise
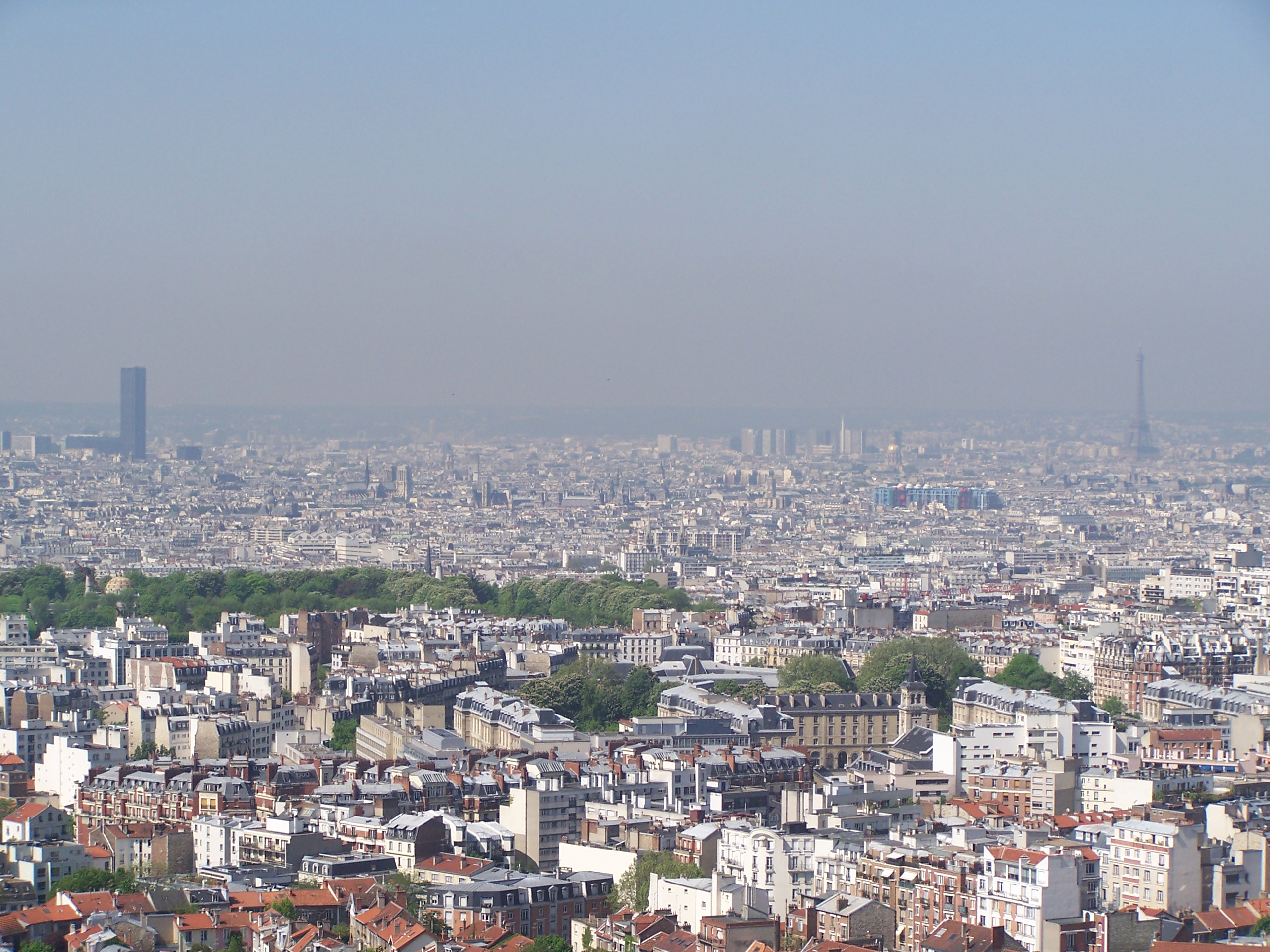
- Aerial view from the Quartier du Père-Lachaise
- Interactive map of Père-Lachaise
- Country: France
- Region: Île-de-France
- Ville: Paris
- Arrondissement: 20th

Area
  - Total: 1.599 km^{2} (0.617 sq mi)

Population (2016)
  - Total: 46,284
  - Density: 28,946/km^{2} (74,970/sq mi)

The Quartier du Père-Lachaise is the 79th administrative quarter of Paris located in the 20th arrondissement.

== Location ==
The quarters of the 20th arrondissement.

The Quartier du Père-Lachaise is located in the heart of the 20th arrondissement, bordered to the north by the rue de Ménilmontant by the Quartier de Belleville, to the east by the rue Pelleport by the Quartier de Saint-Fargeau, to the southeast by the rue de Bagnolet by the Quartier de Charonne and to the west by the boulevards de Charonne and de Ménilmontant by the 11th arrondissement.

== History ==
Urbanization only reached this part of Paris during the 19th century. Before then, the countryside extended into the area, and clergymen and wealthy Parisians would vacation there. The creation of the cemetery during Napoleon's reign shaped the development of the neighborhood.

Like the rest of the 20th arrondissement, the Quartier du Père-Lachaise was incorporated into the city of Paris in 1860, when it expanded to include the surrounding communes. It was located just beyond the Wall of the Fermiers généraux, which followed the route of the boulevards of Ménilmontant and Charonne. Until then, it had been part of the communes of Charonne and Belleville.

The district takes its name from the cemetery of the same name.

Avenue Gambetta and Rue Belgrand were laid out after Charonne was annexed to Paris.

== Specific sites ==
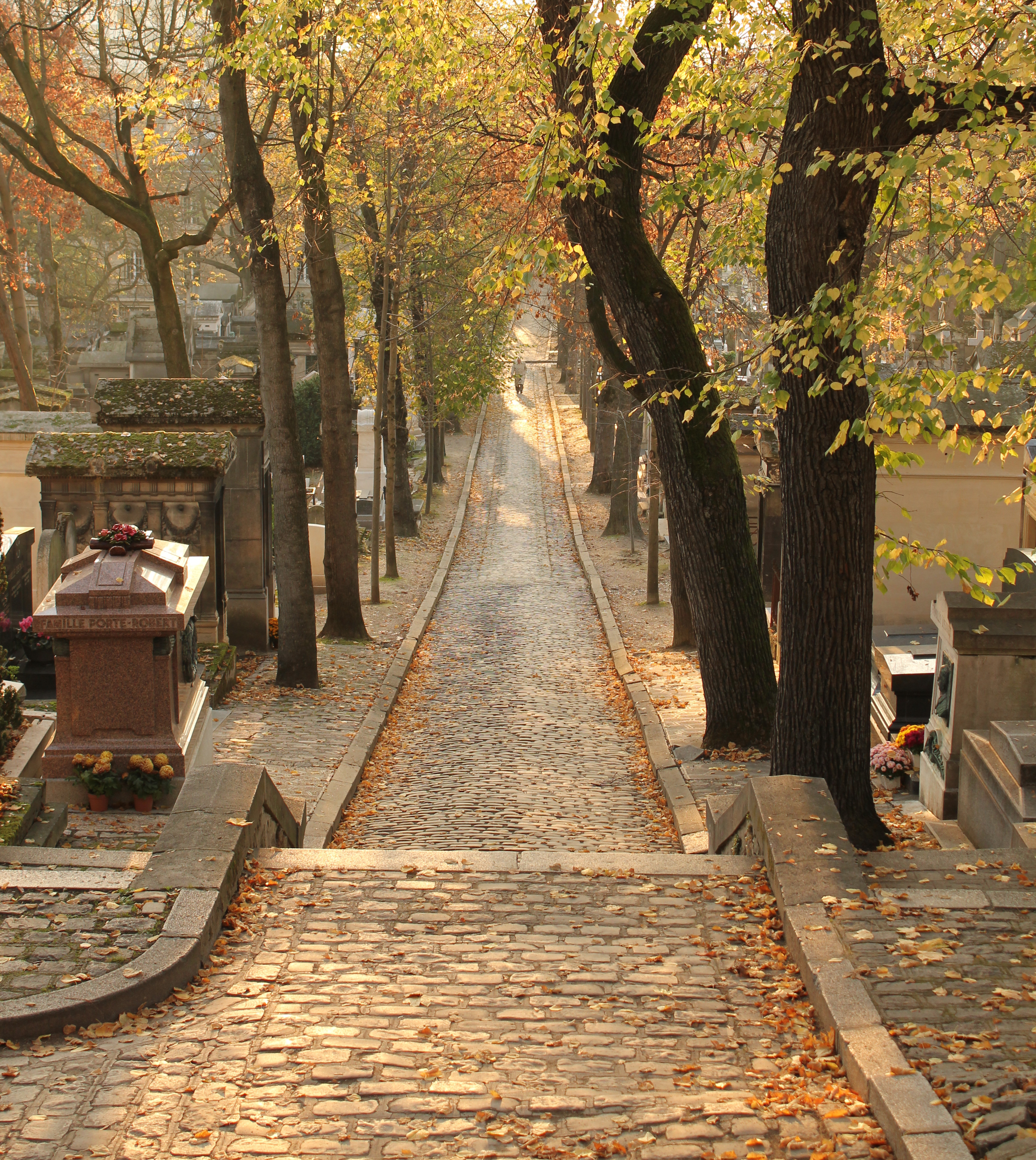
Père Lachaise Cemetery

- Père Lachaise Cemetery
- Paris 20th arrondissement town hall
- Hôpital Tenon
