= Quartier de la plaine Monceau =

Coordinates: 48.88452911376953°N 2.2973012924194336°E

Plaine Monceau
- Quartier de la plaine Monceau
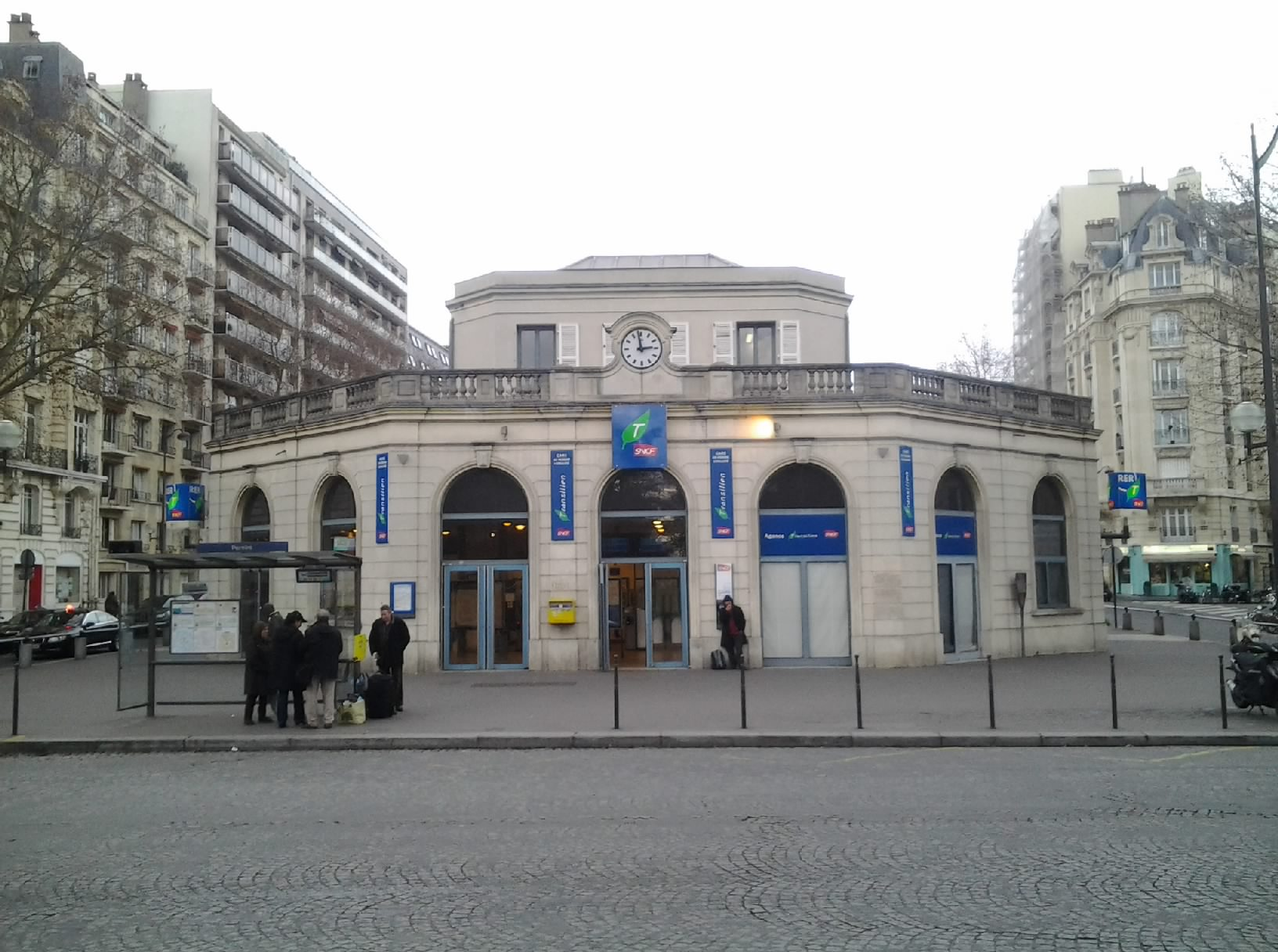
- Pereire–Levallois station in 2014
- Interactive map of Plaine Monceau
- Country: France
- Region: Île-de-France
- Ville: Paris
- Arrondissement: 17th

Area
  - Total: 1.384 km^{2} (0.534 sq mi)

Population (2016)
  - Total: 41,918
  - Density: 30,288/km^{2} (78,450/sq mi)

The Quartier de la plaine Monceau is the 66th quarter of Paris, located in the 17th arrondissement.

The Quarters of the 17th arrondissement

== Origin of the name ==
Its name derives from the hamlet of Monceau, which was situated on the plateau of the same name (known in French as the Plaine de Monceaux). This former hamlet took its name from a small hill or plateau—or perhaps several, as suggested by the plural "x" that occasionally appears—located along the road from Paris to Asnières; it designated the parish of Clichy, near the present-day Rue de Lévis. The name was frequently rendered as mons Calvus ("bald hill"), Monticellum ("small hill"), or Muscelli ("mossy area")—terms that evolved into "Mousseaux", "Monceaux", and, ultimately, "Monceau".

== History ==
The district covers an area of 1,384 hectares and has a population of approximately 40,000 (38,985 in 2005). In the 18th century, the area served as a royal hunting ground. Following its incorporation into the city in 1860—and in connection with the creation of a prestigious park, Parc Monceau—this new Parisian district became a popular place of residence for the wealthy, particularly the nouveaux riches of the Second French Empire.

Development from 1846 to 1868

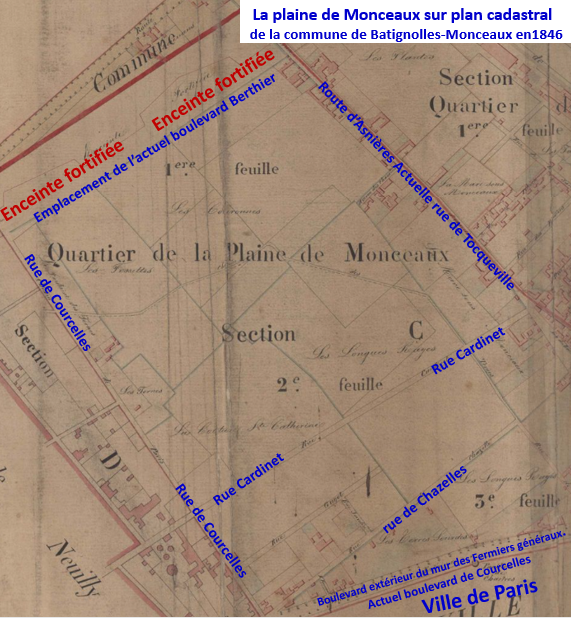
La Plaine-Monceau on the 1846 cadastre.

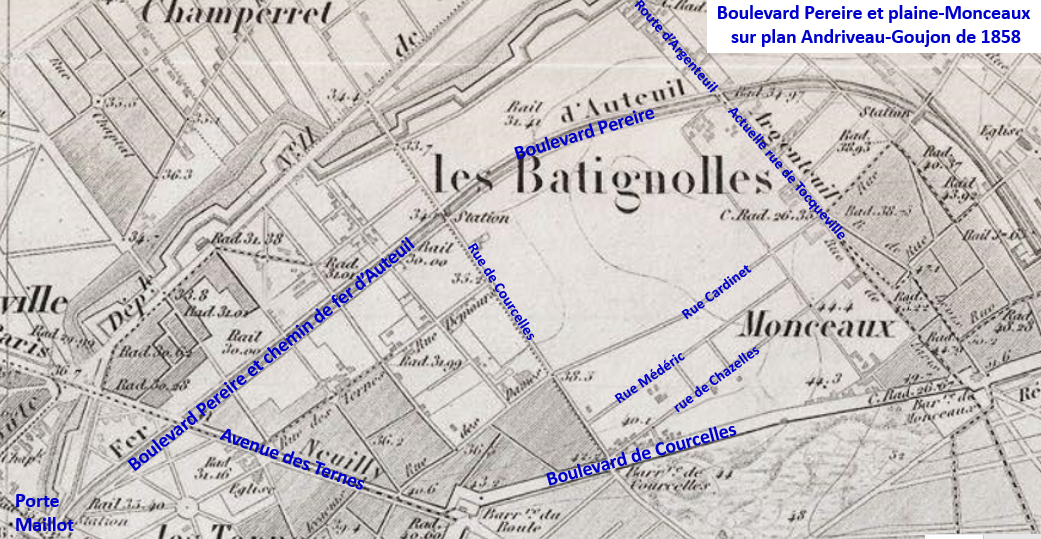
La Plaine-Monceau 1858.

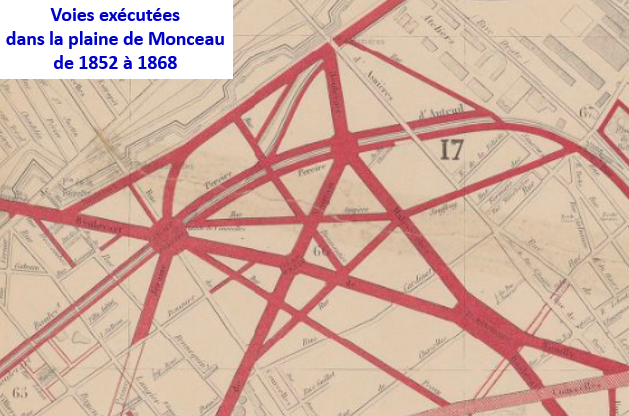
Streets laid out in the Quartier de la Plaine Monceau between 1852 and 1868.
La Place Pereire 1854 and 1900

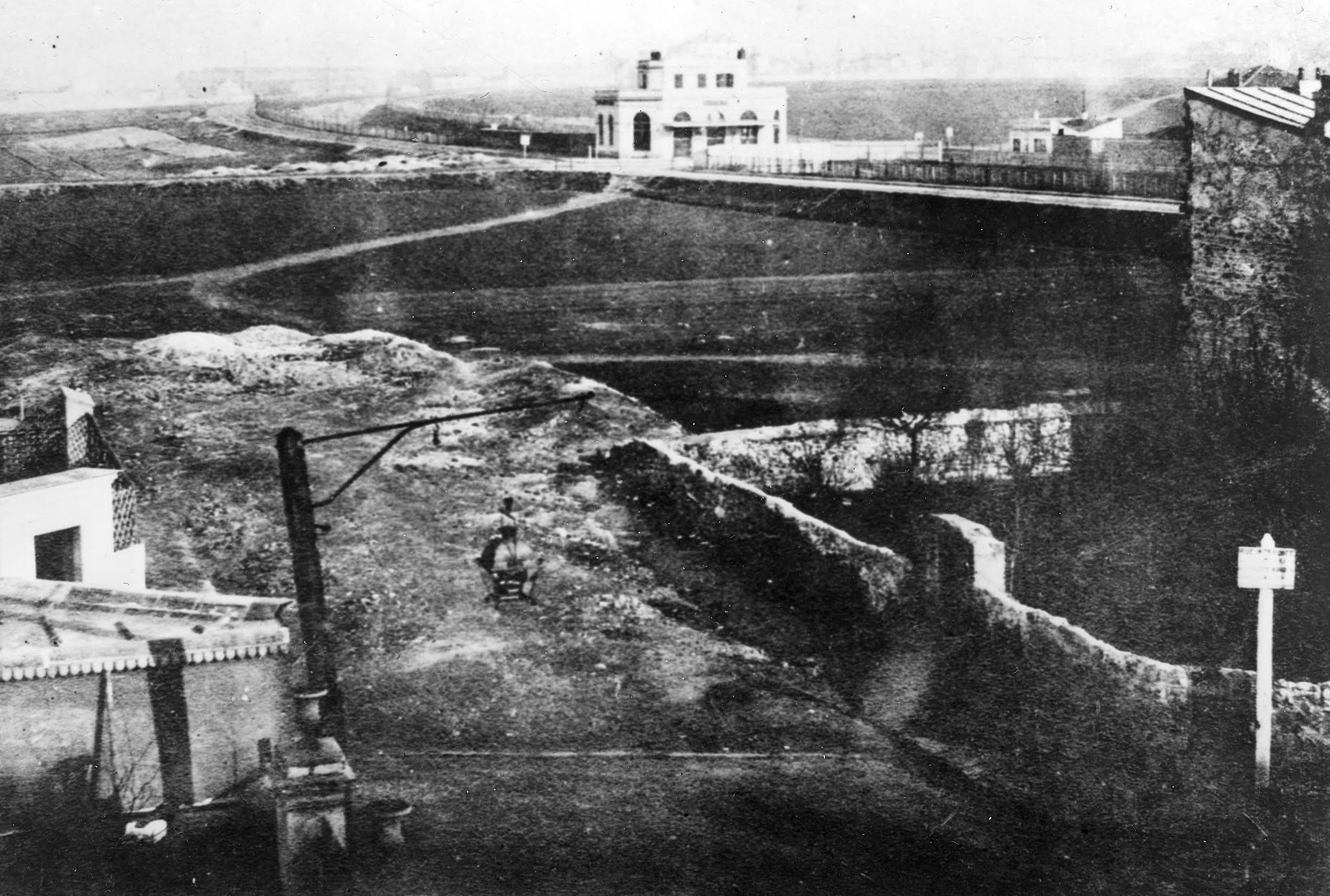
Place and Boulevard Pereire 1854

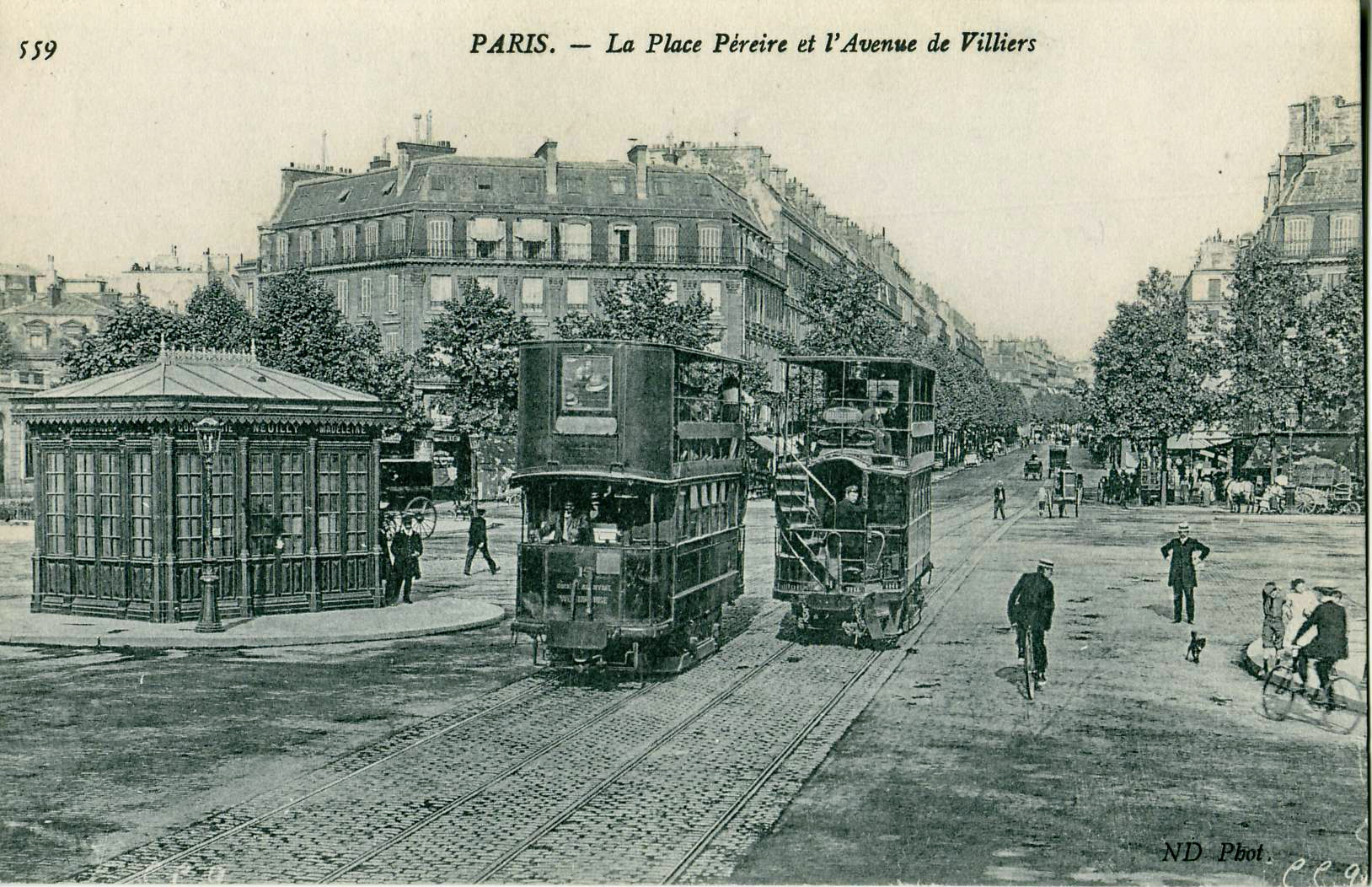
Place Pereire and Avenue de Villiers around 1900

== Sightseeing features ==
- Swedish Church in Paris, 9 Rue Médèric
- Lycée Carnot, 145 Boulevard Malesherbes
- Musée national Jean-Jacques Henner, 43 Avenue de Villiers
- Campus of the Sorbonne University
