= Quartier de Rochechouart =

Coordinates: 48.8769919°N 2.3464947°E

Rochechouart
- Quartier de Rochechouart
- Square Montholon
- Interactive map of Rochechouart
- Country: France
- Region: Île-de-France
- Ville: Paris
- Arrondissement: 9th

Area
  - Total: 0.501 km^{2} (0.193 sq mi)

Population (2016)
  - Total: 22,222
  - Density: 44,355/km^{2} (114,880/sq mi)

The Quartier de Rochechouart is the 36th of the 80 quarters of Paris, located in the 9th arrondissement.

== Location ==
The quarter in the 9th arrondissement of Paris is bounded by the following streets:

- West: Rue des Martyrs
- North: Boulevard Marguerite-de-Rochechouart
- East: Rue du Faubourg-Poissonnière
- South: Rue Montholon, Rue Lamartine

== Origin of the name ==
The neighborhood bears the name of a scholar, Marguerite de Rochechouart de Montpipeau (1665–1727), Abbess of Montmartre. Two major streets in the district are also named after her: Boulevard Marguerite-de-Rochechouart and Rue Marguerite de Rochechouart.

== History ==
The quarters of the 9th arrondissment

For the most part, the area was used for agriculture until the 18th century. The first structures appeared in 1644 in the former district of Nouvelle France—a hamlet (hameau) situated near what is now Square Montholon, surrounding the Château Charolais.

The area was also known as the "food supply district," as it was here—by order of Napoleon, who sought to improve safety and hygiene in Paris—that the Montmartre slaughterhouses (Abattoirs de Montmartre) were established.

Following the construction of the Compagnie parisienne de gaz's first gasometer in the 19th century, the area evolved into an industrial district. This character was further reinforced when Alexis Godillot established his military equipment manufacturing business there.

Notable figures, including Victor Hugo, Georges Bizet, and Gustave Courbet, resided in the district. During the Belle Époque, the area enjoyed a golden age—a legacy still evidenced by several surviving structures dating from the late 19th century.
