= Quartier du Parc Montsouris =

Coordinates: 48.8219907°N 2.3377922°E

Parc Montsouris
- Quartier du Parc Montsouris
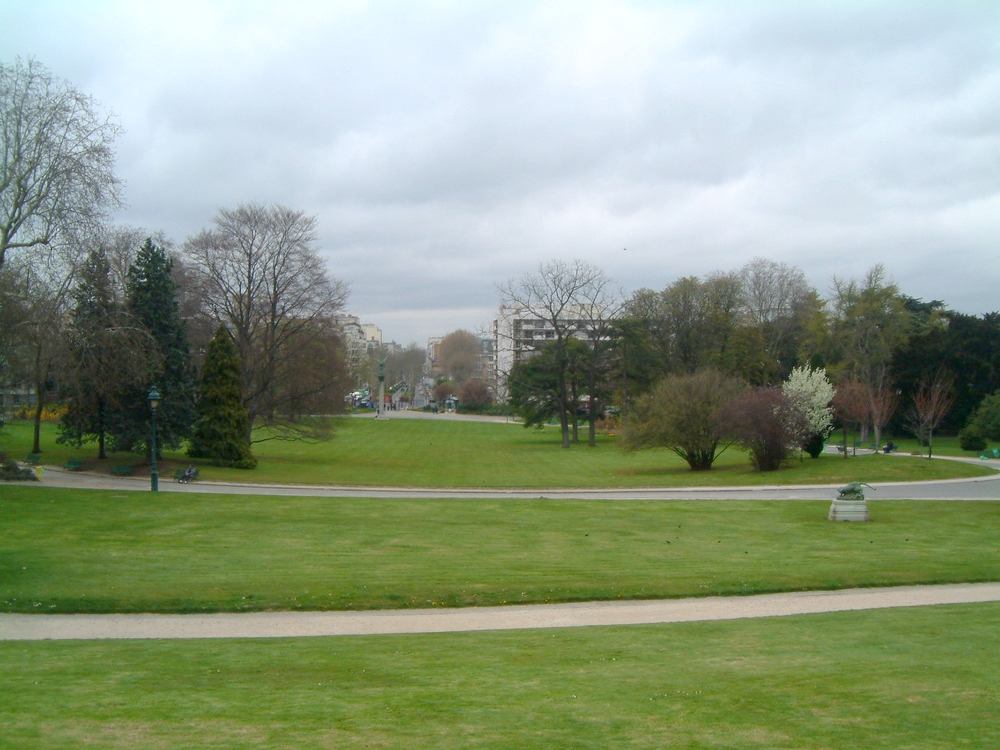
- Parc Montsouris
- Interactive map of Parc Montsouris
- Country: France
- Region: Île-de-France
- Ville: Paris
- Arrondissement: 14th

Area
  - Total: 1.357 km^{2} (0.524 sq mi)

Population (2016)
  - Total: 21,257
  - Density: 15,665/km^{2} (40,570/sq mi)

The Quartier du Parc Montsouris is the 54th of the 80 quarters of Paris and belongs to the 14th arrondissement.

The Quarters of the 14th arrondissement

== Origin of the name ==
Parc Montsouris occupies 15 hectares of the neighborhood, which is why it was named after the park.

== Location ==
The following streets form the boundaries of the neighborhood:

- North: Boulevard Saint-Jacques
- East: Rue de la Santé, Rue de l’Amiral Mouchez, and Avenue Pierre de Coubertin
- South: Avenue Paul Vaillant-Couturier, Avenue Pierre Masse, and Avenue du Docteur Lannelongue
- West: Rue de la Tombe Issoire, Rue Émile Faguet, and Rue du Professeur Hyacinthe Vincent

The neighborhood is situated on the left bank of the Bièvre River. When the riverbed—which was located not far from Rue de l’Amiral-Mouchez—was channeled, the original west-to-east gradient was reduced. The winding path of this street bears witness to the river’s original course.

== History ==
The Quartier du Parc de Montsouris came into existence at the same time as the 14th arrondissement, following the annexation of a portion of the commune of Gentilly into Paris in 1860. At that time, the area was a rural suburb, containing only the access roads leading from Gentilly to Paris—the Rue de la Santé and the Rue de l’Amiral-Mouchez—along with a few buildings belonging to the Sainte-Anne Hospital Center. There were also slums, or shantytowns (known in French as bidonvilles), in the area during that period.

=== Urbanization ===
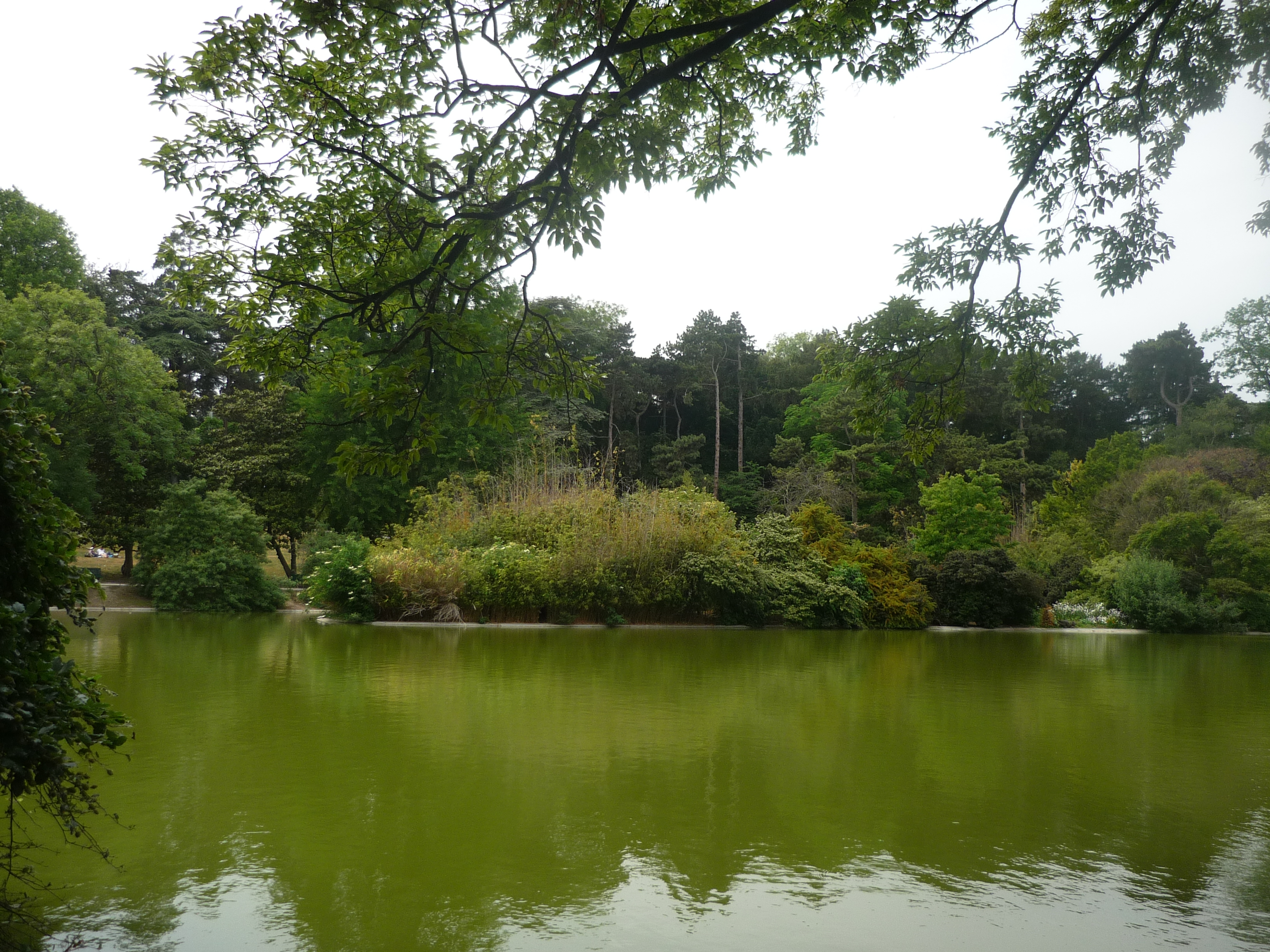
The lake in Parc Montsouris

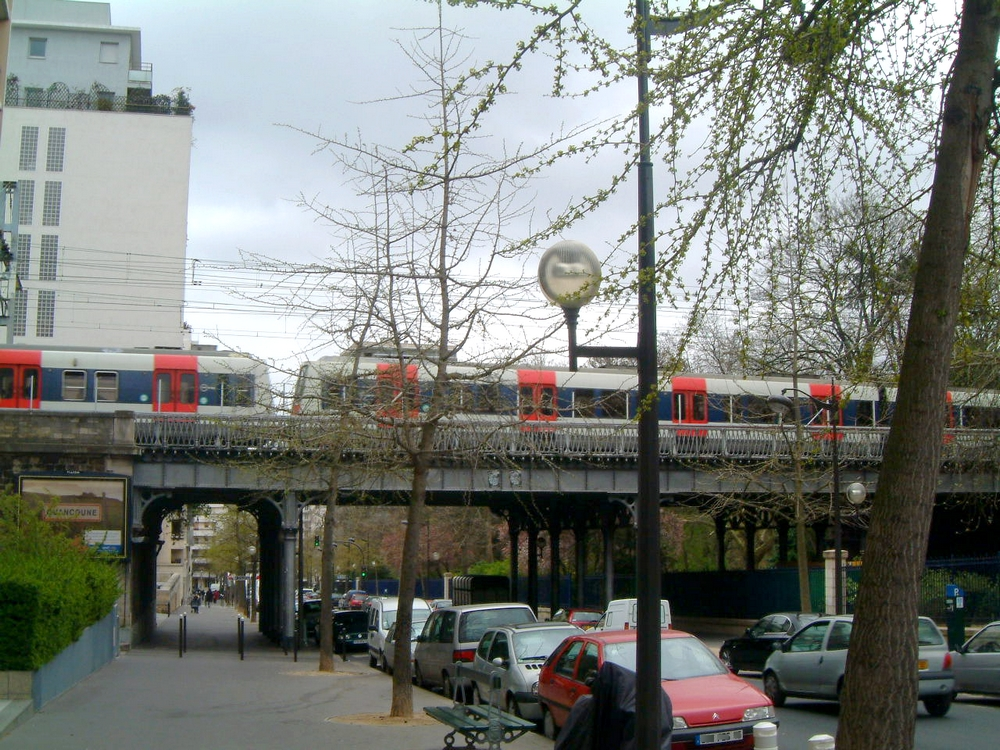
The Line crosses the district from north to south

The expansion of Paris initially took place along the road toward Gentilly and on the periphery of the Sainte-Anne Hospital, which has existed since 1651. It was not until the 19th century that the area was fully integrated into the city, following the covering of the Bièvre river, the development policies implemented by Alphand, and the construction of the Avenue du Parc Montsouris (now Avenue René Coty) by Haussmann.

The district is characterized by a concentration of large-scale public facilities: the Sainte-Anne Hospital, Parc Montsouris, the Montsouris Reservoir (also known as the "Reservoir de la Vanne"), the Cité internationale universitaire de Paris, and the above-ground railway line (formerly the Ligne de Sceaux).

Consequently, there is little space left for residential buildings. The few apartment buildings dating from the Haussmann era are primarily located along the Rue d’Alésia and the Avenue René Coty. Some typical suburban-style houses can be found on the Rue de l’Amiral Mouchez. Modern apartment buildings did not appear until after the World War II, when more land became available.

At the beginning of the 2000s, an entirely new residential area was developed. Along the new Avenue de la Sibelle, several streets were laid out—Rue Thomas-Francine, Rue de l'Empereur-Valentinien, and Rue de l’Empereur Julien—along with a garden, the Jardin Marie-Thérèse Auffray.

== Sightseeing features ==
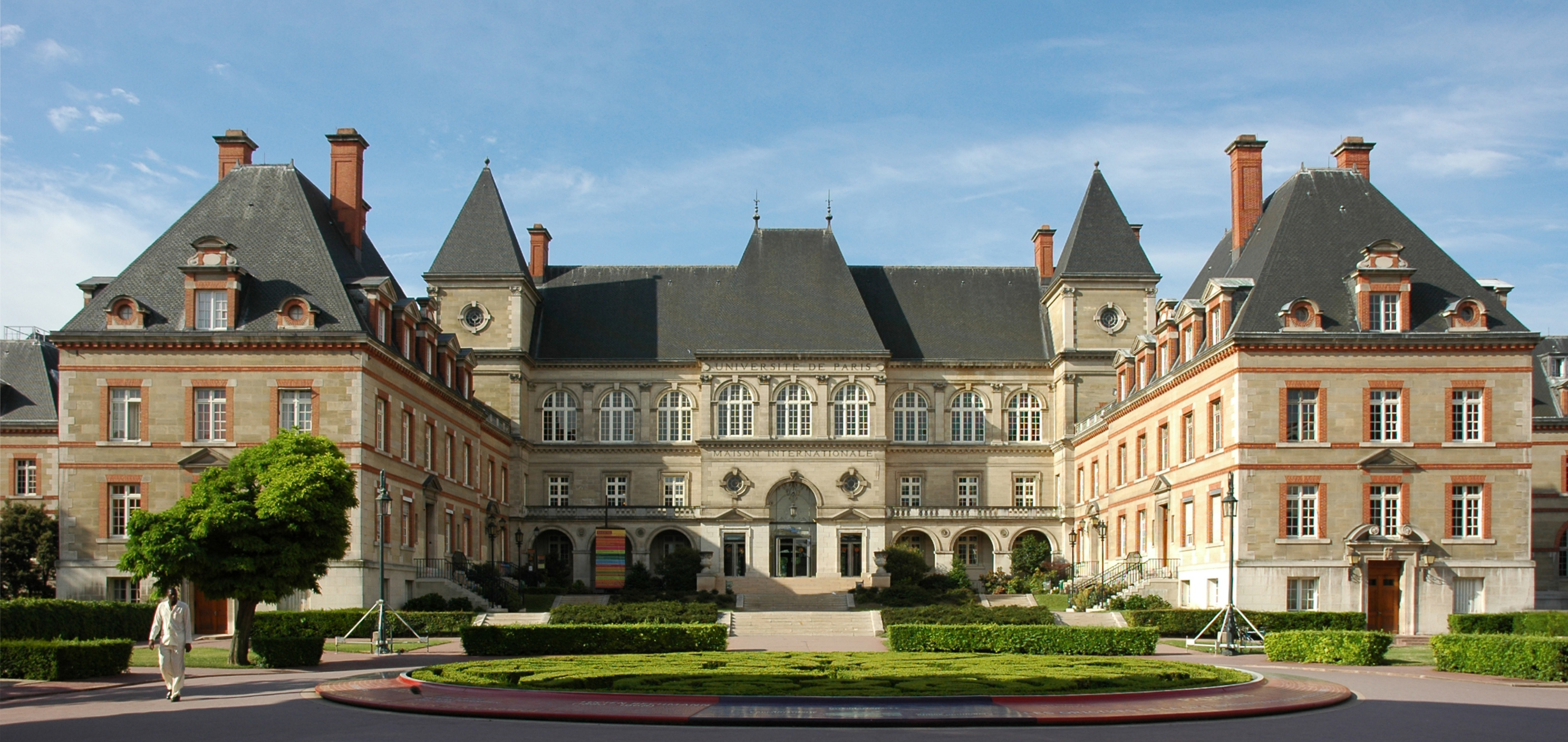
La Maison internationale de la Cité universitaire

- Parc Montsouris, from which the neighborhood takes its name.
- Cité Universitaire
- The buildings on the west side of the park
- Réservoir de Montsouris, which stores water from the Loing river and supplies the southern part of Paris.
- Sainte-Anne Hospital Center
