= Quartier de Plaisance =

Coordinates: 48.8363431°N 2.3180753°E

Plaisance
- Quartier de Plaisance
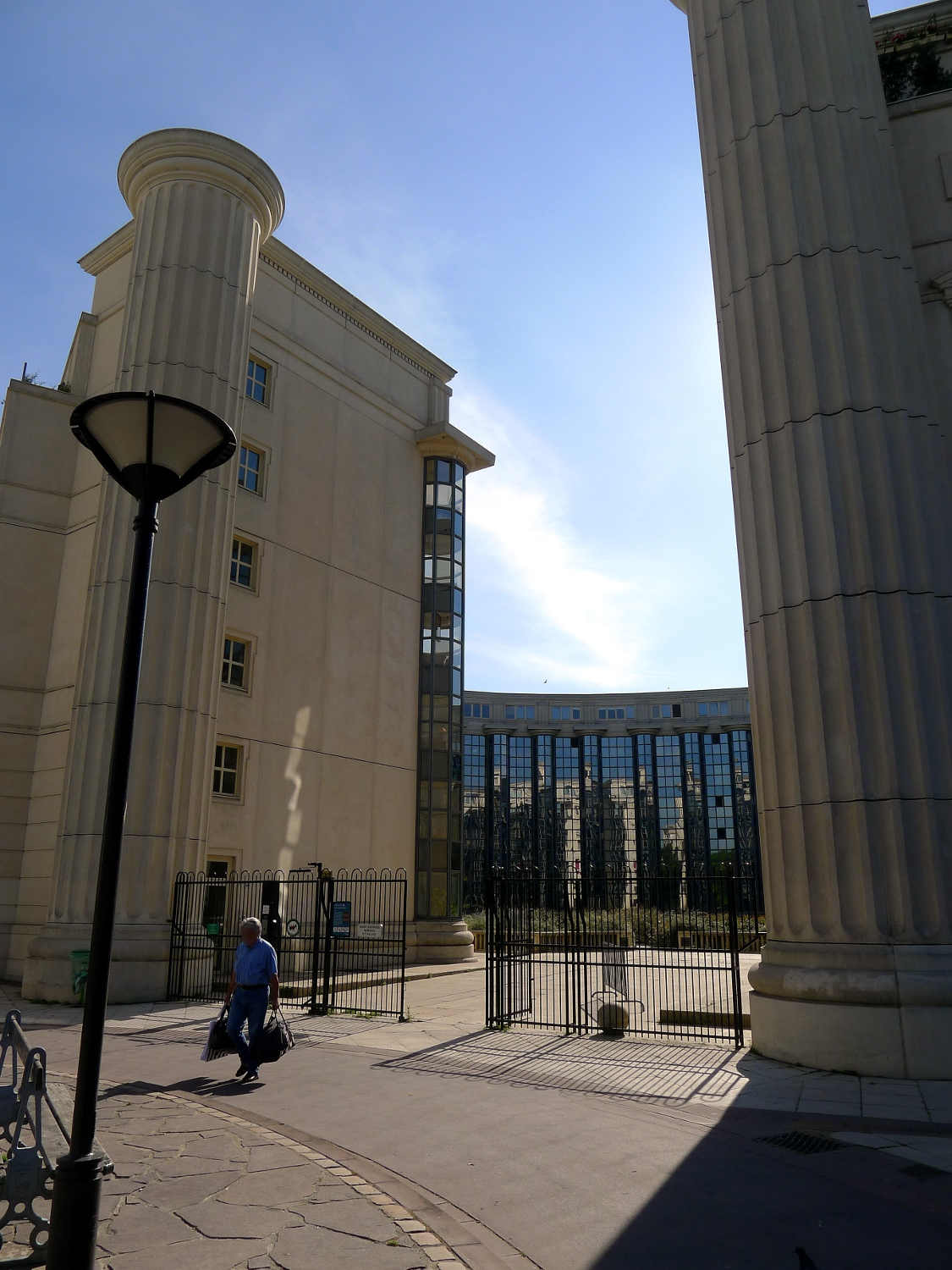
- Place de Séoul
- Interactive map of Plaisance
- Country: France
- Region: Île-de-France
- Ville: Paris
- Arrondissement: 14th

Area
  - Total: 1.785 km^{2} (0.689 sq mi)

Population (2016)
  - Total: 59,279
  - Density: 33,210/km^{2} (86,000/sq mi)

The Quartier de Plaisance is the 56th quarter of Paris, located in the city's 14th arrondissement.

The name "Plaisance" predates the current administrative division. The City of Paris describes Plaisance as a former hamlet of Vaugirard situated within what is now the 14th arrondissement; during the 19th century, the area underwent a process of subdivision and urbanization.

== Location ==
The Quarters of the 14th arrondissement

Plaisance occupies the western sector of the 14th arrondissement of Paris. To the north it borders with the neighborhood of Montparnasse, to the east with Petit-Montrouge and to the south with the municipal boundary of Paris, beyond which is the commune of Malakoff. To the west it borders the 15th arrondissement of Paris, from which it is separated in large part by the railway line of the Gare Montparnasse. The administrative mapping locates on the other side of the western boundary the neighborhoods of Saint-Lambert and Necker, belonging to the 15th arrondissement. The rue Raymond-Losserand is one of the main north-south axes of Plaisance. Other prominent streets of the sector are the rue Didot, the rue Vercingétorix and the rue d'Alésia.

== History ==
Plan of the "village of Plaisance"

=== From the hamlet to the Plaisance housing development ===
Plaisance Protestant Church, at 95 Rue de l'Ouest

Plaisance originated as an old hamlet in Vaugirard, located outside the limits of Paris. During the 19th century, the area underwent a process of land subdivision that gradually transformed this suburban space. The Commission du Vieux Paris dates the beginning of the subdivision of Plaisance to 1830—in a territory that was, at the time, situated outside of Paris, beyond and along the edge of the Fermiers Généraux wall.

These developments were driven by small-scale landowners who acquired plots of land and laid out streets and alleyways. Among the initial developers, the source mentions Alexandre-Marie Couesnon, François Cels, and Alexandre Chauvelot.

=== Urban development and annexation to Paris ===
Old Château de Plaisance, at 142 rue du Château, drawing by Henri Chapelle from 1900

During the 19th century, Plaisance became part of a broader process of urban development that would eventually form what is now the 14th arrondissement. Until then, this area on the Parisian periphery had seen little urban development; its growth occurred through the amalgamation of various settlements and housing developments, including the lotissement (subdivision) of Plaisance. In 1860, the expansion of Paris's city limits incorporated territories from neighboring communes—situated between the Wall of the Fermiers Généraux and the Thiers fortifications—into the capital. This territorial reorganization gave rise to the present-day 14th arrondissement, within which Plaisance was integrated.

== Urban life and facilities ==
In 1855, through the initiative of Pastor Henry Paumier, a Protestant parish was founded in Plaisance. Two schools and an orphanage were also established there.

In 1862, the community requested that the City of Paris construct a dedicated place of worship for them. Construction began in 1864, and the building—to which a school complex was added—was inaugurated in 1879.

== Heritage and Urban Imprint ==
Porte de Plaisance in 1919, before the dismantling of the old fortifications

Among the elements linked to the historic Plaisance area was the Château de Plaisance, located at 142 Rue du Château. The building belonged to the Couesnon family, was surrounded by a park, and was demolished in 1900. The process of land subdivision that began in the 19th century also left its mark on the street layout. The Commission du Vieux Paris includes Thermopyles among the small-scale developments in the sector that began to be subdivided in 1830. Rue des Thermopyles remains part of the Plaisance neighborhood and has been the subject of municipal projects for the organization of public space.

The name "Plaisance" also extended to the fortifications of Paris. The Musée Carnavalet documents the Porte de Plaisance—part of the 1841 fortifications—in a 1919 photograph taken before its dismantling.

== Plaisance in the present ==
The toponym remains in use within various territorial designations and structures for local resident participation in the district. The 14th Arrondissement Town Hall (Mairie) has a "Didot – Plaisance – Porte de Vanves" neighborhood council (Conseil de quartier).

Within the framework of municipal urban policy, the name "Plaisance–Pernety" is also used for one of the popular neighborhoods in the 14th arrondissement.
