= Quartier de la Folie-Méricourt =

Coordinates: 48.8635472°N 2.3675789°E

Folie-Méricourt
- Quartier de la Folie-Méricourt
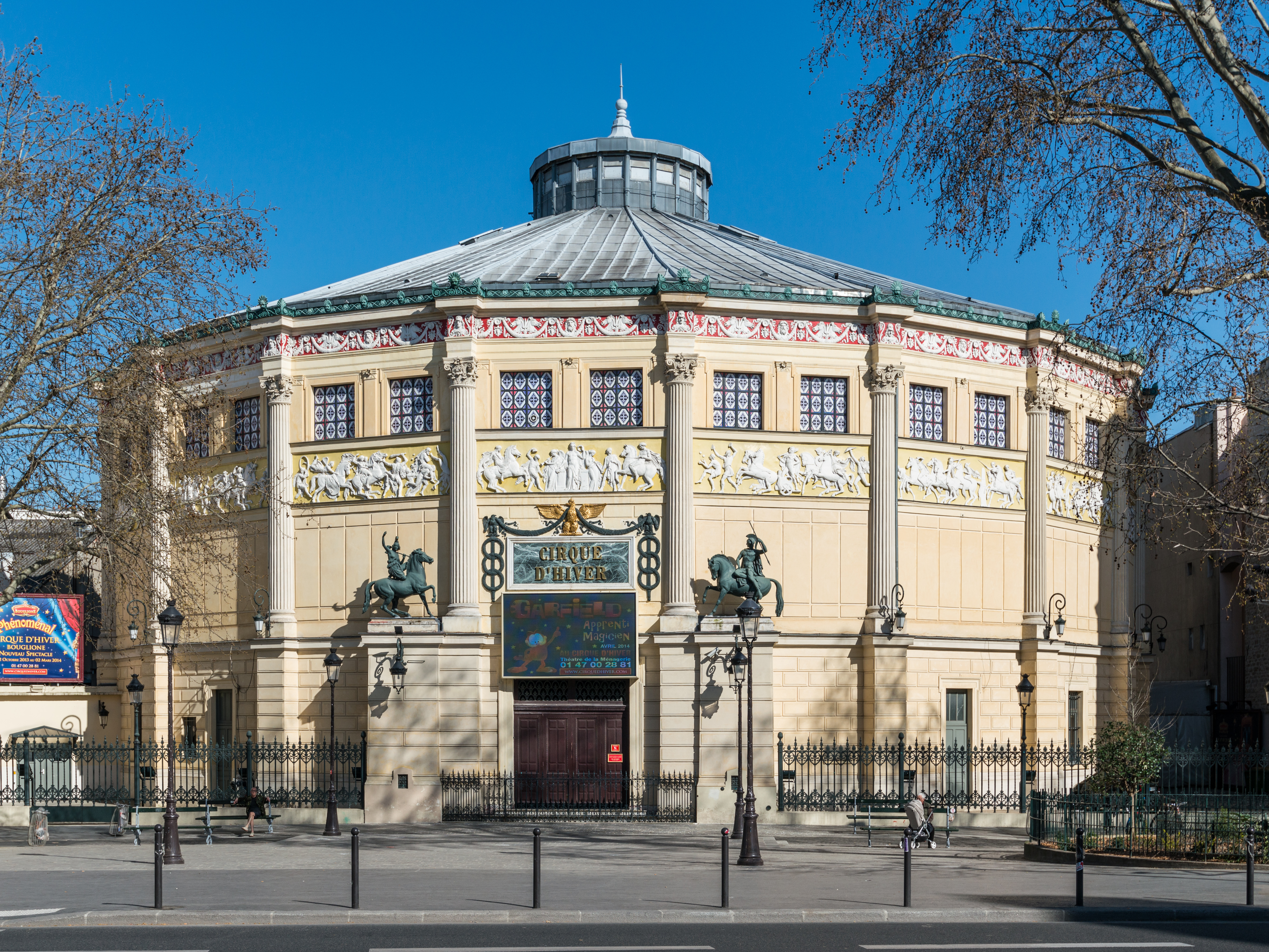
- Cirque d'hiver
- Interactive map of Folie-Méricourt
- Country: France
- Region: Île-de-France
- Ville: Paris
- Arrondissement: 11th

Area
  - Total: 0.726 km^{2} (0.280 sq mi)

Population (2016)
  - Total: 31,376
  - Density: 43,218/km^{2} (111,930/sq mi)

The Quartier de la Folie-Méricourt is the 41st of the 80 quarters of Paris, located in the 11th arrondissement.

The Quarters of the 11th arrondissement

== Location ==
The administrative district in the 11th arrondissement of Paris is bounded by the following streets:

- Southwest: Boulevard du Temple
- Northwest: Rue du Faubourg du Temple
- Northeast: Boulevard de Belleville
- Southeast: Rue Oberkampf

== Origin of the name ==
The popular Folie-Méricourt theater was located in the neighborhood.

== History ==
The neighborhood extends south of the Faubourg du Temple and southwest of the hill of Belleville, reaching as far as the meander of a prehistoric branch of the Seine—an area encompassing the space between today’s Boulevard du Temple and the Rue de la Folie-Méricourt. In the Middle Ages, this site was part of an estate belonging to the Knights Templar, where vegetables were cultivated; it was known as the "Marais du Temple" (Swamp of the Temple).

Situated along the city wall of Charles V, this area retained its rural character until the end of the 18th century—even though the Boulevard du Temple was established here as early as 1670, and the wall of the Fermiers généraux was built in 1788 (which later, in 1860, gave way to the Boulevard de Belleville).

The urbanization of this part of Paris—the section closest to the city center—began in the 1780s with the development of the "Nouvelle Ville d'Angoulême" (New Town of Angoulême) on land previously used for market gardening within the Marais du Temple.

The neighborhood’s development accelerated significantly after 1830, following the opening of the Canal Saint-Martin and the establishment of various trades and industries in the neighboring Faubourg Saint-Antoine.

In recent years, the southwestern part of the neighborhood has undergone a transformation—most notably along the Rue Oberkampf, which, with its numerous restaurants, cafés, and bars, has become a hub for entertainment and nightlife.

== Sightseeing features ==
- Cirque d'hiver
- Square Jules Ferry with the Canal Saint-Martin
