= Quartier des Ternes =

Coordinates: 48.8737791°N 2.2950372°E

Ternes
- Quartier des Ternes
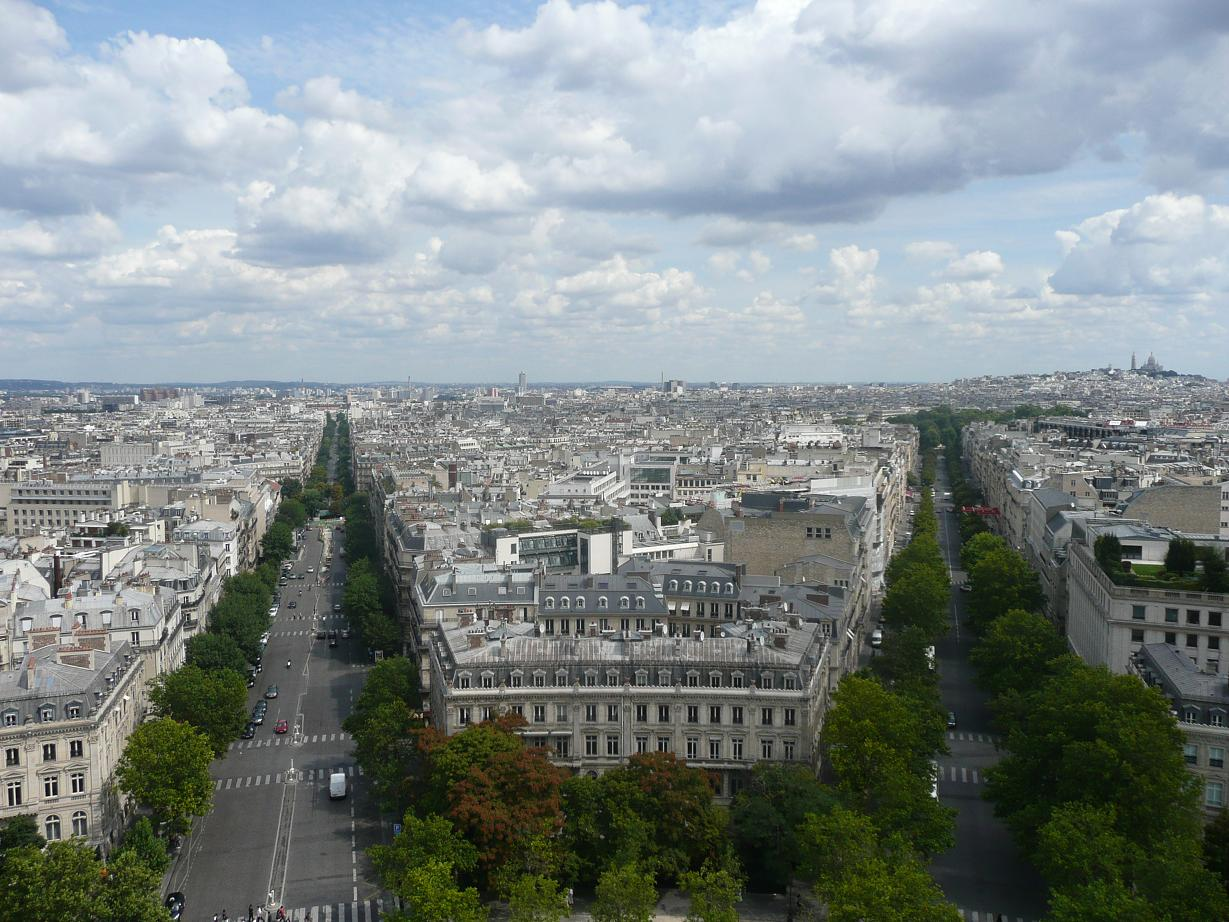
- Paris view from Arc de Triomphe in 2014
- Interactive map of Ternes
- Country: France
- Region: Île-de-France
- Ville: Paris
- Arrondissement: 17th

Area
  - Total: 1.466 km^{2} (0.566 sq mi)

Population (2016)
  - Total: 38,576
  - Density: 26,314/km^{2} (68,150/sq mi)

The Quartier des Ternes is the 65th of the 80 quarters of Paris and belongs to the 17th arrondissement of Paris.

The Quarters of the 17th arrondissement

== Location ==
The district lies north of the Place Charles de Gaulle and is bounded to the east by the Avenue de Wagram and to the west by the Avenue de la Grande Armée. This "quadrilateral" is closed off to the north by a section of the Boulevards of the Marshals (Boulevard Pershing – Boulevard Gouvion-Saint-Cyr) and by the Rue Rennequin.

== Origin of the name ==
The name is derived from the small village of Ternes (French: village des Ternes), which had formed around a farmstead known as "Villa externa" (an outlying farm). The village was absorbed by Neuilly and became part of Paris in 1860.

== Histoire ==
In the 13th century, the "Village des Ternes" was a modest settlement situated on the slopes of a wooded hill—a site then known as the "Montagne du Roule"—and surrounded by forests and marshes. Apart from a few cultivated fields and sparse pastures, the area, dotted with hunting lodges tucked away in small woods, remained a private preserve for the leisure of lords and kings until the French Revolution. Two charters, dating from 1236 and 1245, record that the Abbey of Saint-Denis granted land near the Ternes farmstead (granchiam de Ternis) to the sick of Roule.

In Ternes—much like in Monceau—the initial urban core did not form around a religious institution, but rather around a feudal residence. In the mid-16th century, the farmstead was acquired by the calligrapher and poet Pierre Habert, who served as a valet de chambre to King Henry III; he subsequently expanded the property into a château. In 1634, King Louis XIII granted the feudal rights for the estate to Habert’s grandson.

The Hameau des Ternes (Hamlet of Ternes) developed around the Château des Ternes. Until the 17th century, the settlement remained a tiny village of just 18 houses; it only began to expand in the 19th century, as Paris grew westward. By around 1820, the hamlet had become a community of 8,000 inhabitants known as "Ferdinanville," with a new district emerging near the Place de l’Étoile. By the time the area was annexed by the city of Paris in 1863, its population had reached 16,000.

== Sightseeing features ==
- Château des Ternes
- Notre-Dame-de-la-Compassion, Paris
- Church of Saint-Ferdinand des Ternes, Paris
- Palais des congrès de Paris

== Bibliography ==
- Abbé Bellanger, Notice historique sur les Ternes (Seine) et les environs, 1849 (gallica.bnf.fr)
- Collectif, Village Ternes-Monceau: 65e-66e quartiers, Paris, Village communication, 1994, 64 S., ISBN 2-910001-18-0
- Jacques Hillairet, Dictionnaire historique des rues de Paris, Paris, Éditions de Minuit, 1972, 1985, 1991, 1997, etc. (1. Ausg. 1960), 1 476 S., 2 Bd., ISBN 2-7073-1054-9, (OCLC 466966117)
- Félix de Rochegude, Promenades dans toutes les rues de Paris. XVIIe arrondissement, 1910
- Rodolphe Trouilleux, Le Guide du promeneur. 17e arrondissement, Parigramme, 1995, 237 S., ISBN 978-2-84096-027-0
