= Quartier Notre-Dame-des-Champs =

Coordinates: 48.8446836°N 2.3288039°E

Notre-Dame-des-Champs
- Quartier Notre-Dame-des-Champs
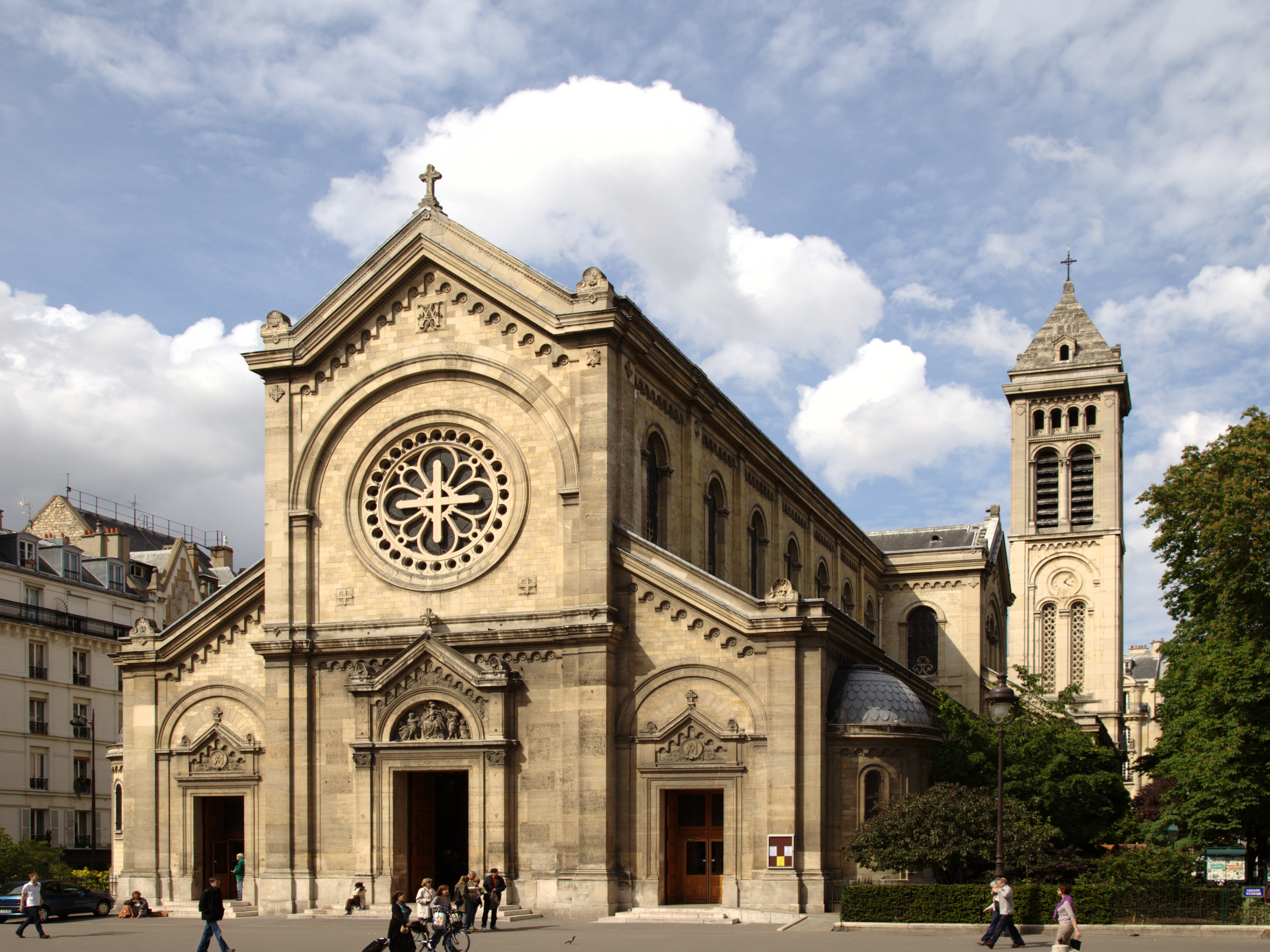
- Notre-Dame-des-Champs
- Interactive map of Notre-Dame-des-Champs
- Country: France
- Region: Île-de-France
- Ville: Paris
- Arrondissement: 6th

Area
  - Total: 0.861 km^{2} (0.332 sq mi)

Population (2016)
  - Total: 22,910
  - Density: 26,620/km^{2} (68,900/sq mi)

The Quartier du Notre-Dame-des-Champs is the 23rd of the 80 quarters of Paris, located in the 6th arrondissement.

== Situation ==
The district resembles an arrowhead: to the west, Rue de Sèvres, Rue du Four (northwest), and Boulevard du Montparnasse (southwest) form the tip, while the "broad side" to the east is formed by Rue d'Assas, Rue Guynemer, and Rue Bonaparte.

The Quarters of the 6th arrondissement.

== Origin of the name ==
The neighborhood takes its name from the former 17th-century chapel of Notre-Dame-des-Champs, of which the present-day Église Notre-Dame-des-Champs stands as a testament.

== Sightseeing features ==
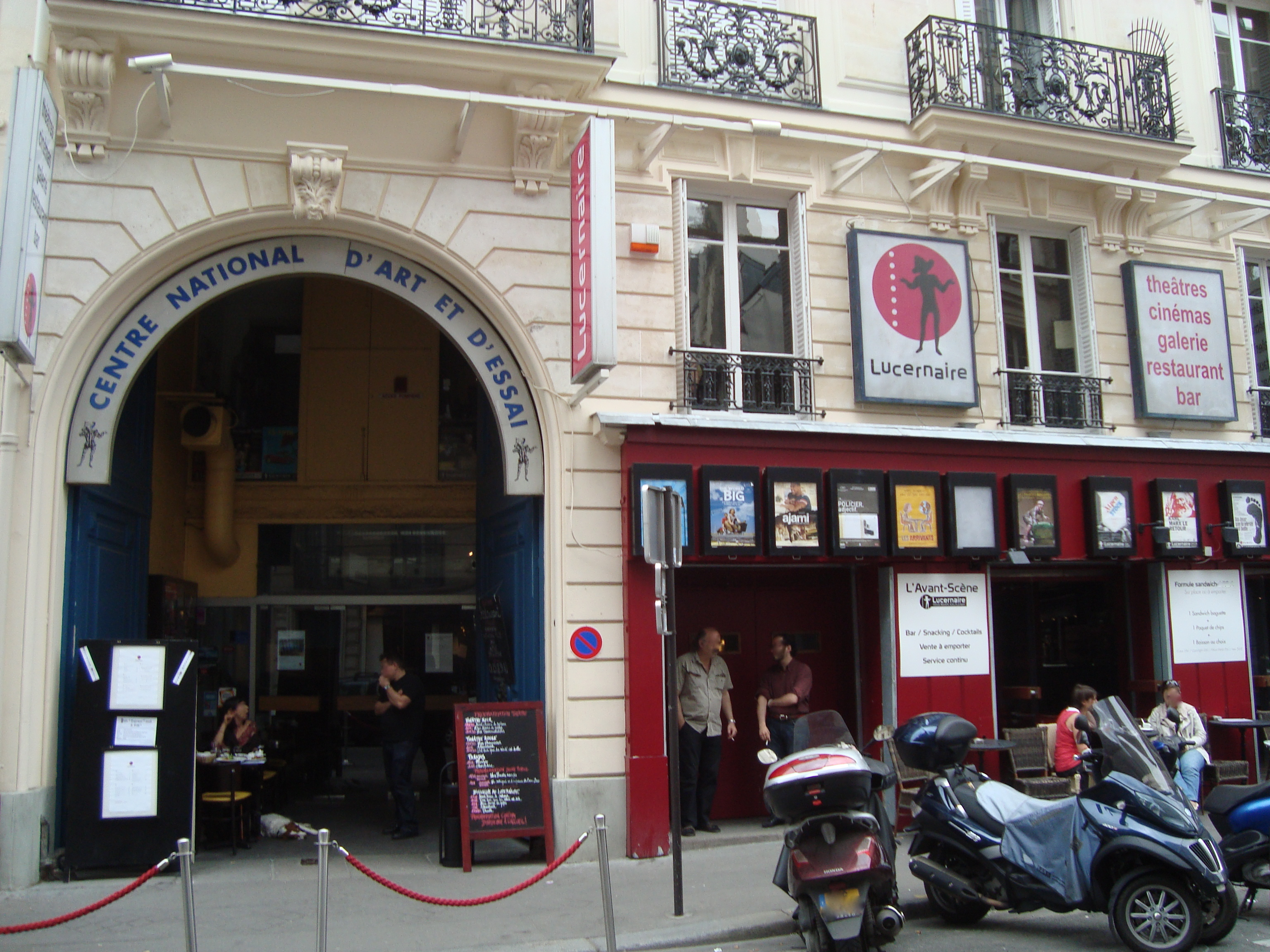
Lucernaire Theater

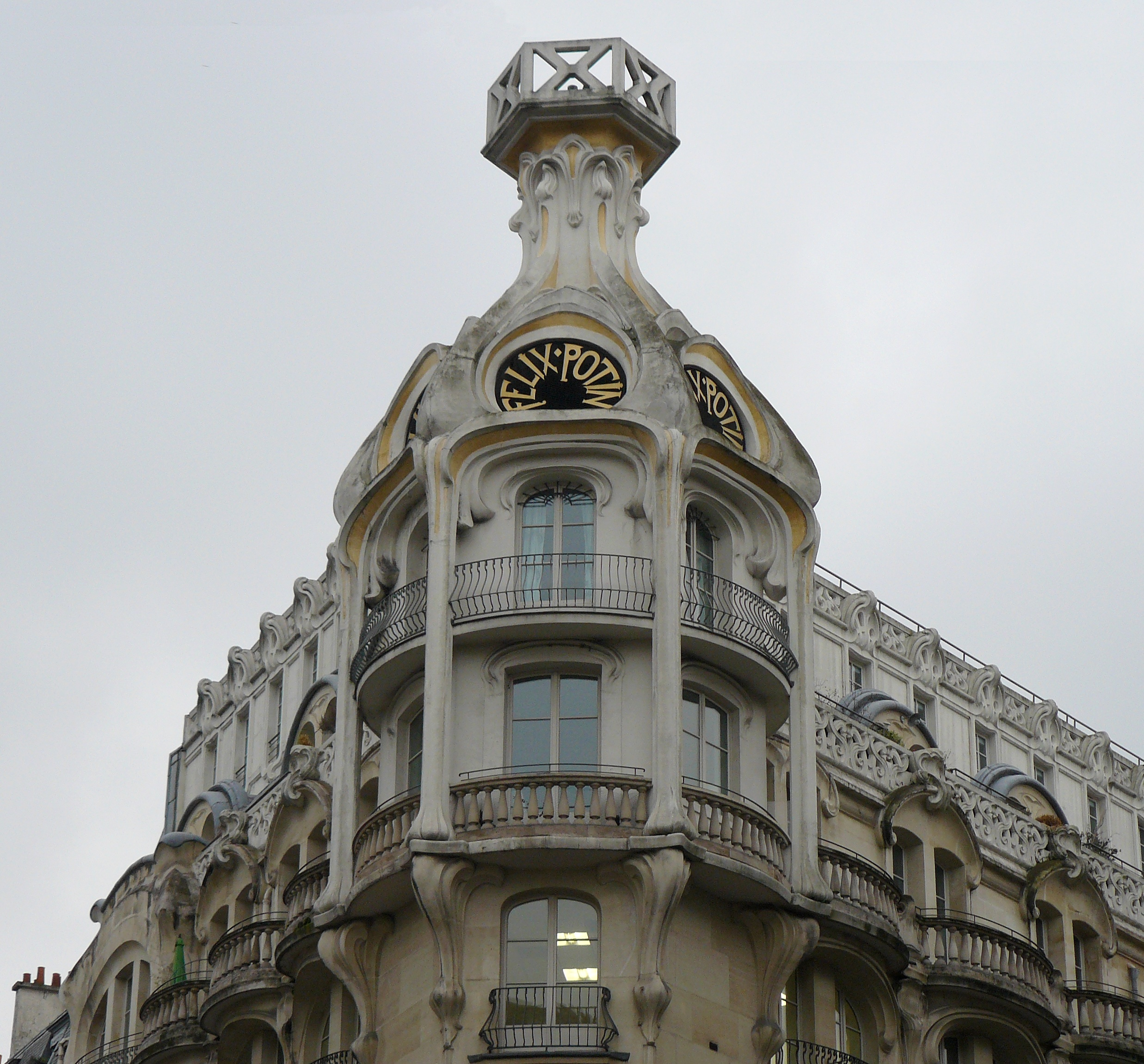
The former Félix Potin department store, Rue de Rennes

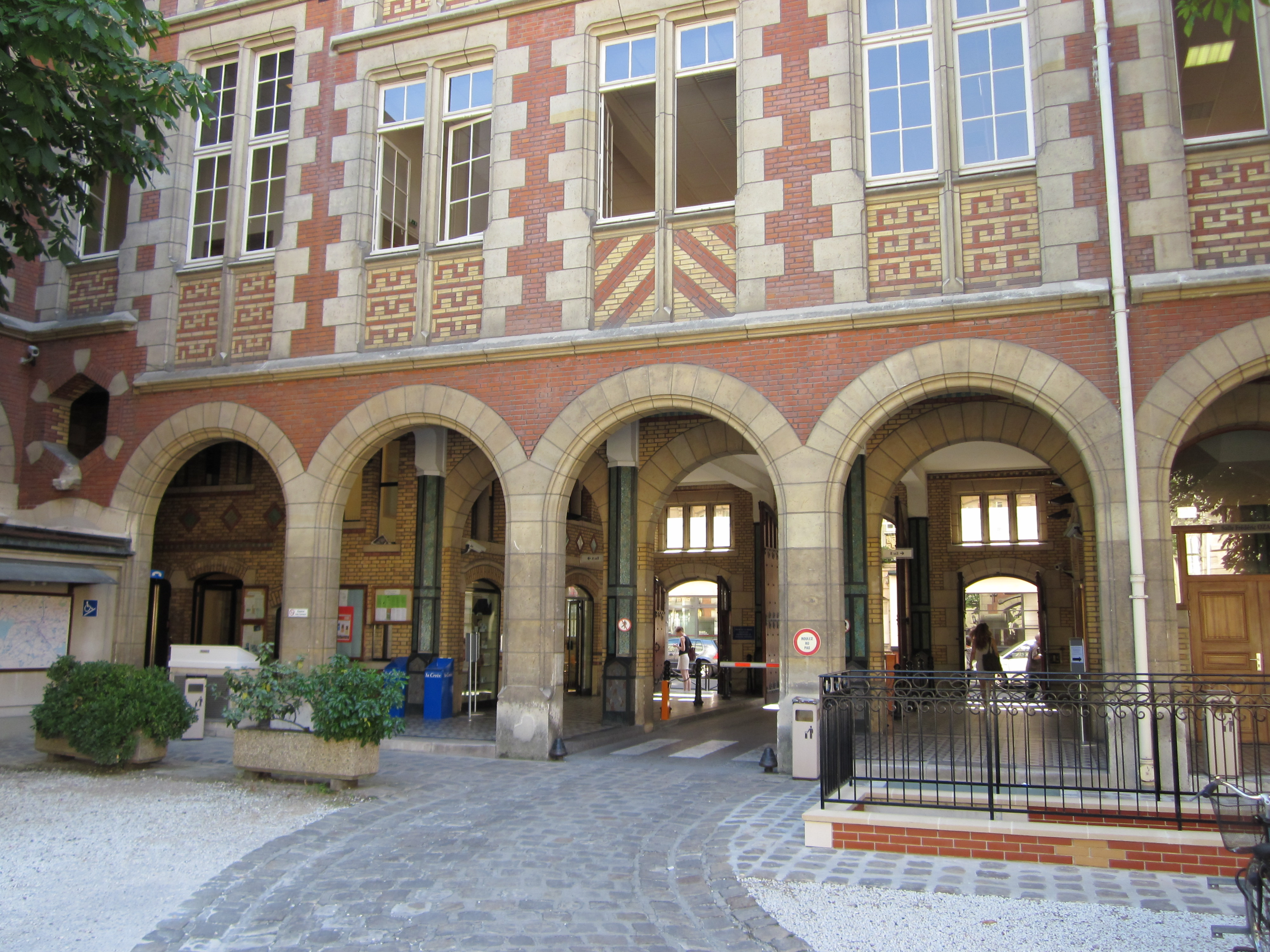
Courtyard of the Catholic University of Paris
