= Quartier des Grandes-Carrières =

Coordinates: 48.8901°N 2.3292°E

18e arrondissement

The quartier des Grandes-Carrières (French pronunciation: [kaʁtje de ɡʁɑ̃d kaʁjɛʁ], "Large Quarries district") district is the 69th administrative district of Paris located in the west of the 18th arrondissement.

It gets its name from the former quarries of gypsum, a basic component of plaster, that were located at the foot of Montmartre since the Middle Ages. The Montmartre Cemetery is the main vestige of the largest gypsum quarry of Paris.

Grandes-Carrières extends north from the Place de Clichy, bordered to the west by Épinettes and to the east by Montmartre and Clignancourt.

== Sites and monuments of interest ==
- Sainte-Geneviève des Grandes Carrières Church,
- Cité Montmartre-aux-Artistes.
