= Quartier de l'École-Militaire =

Administrative district of Paris, France

Coordinates: 48.8518484°N 2.3047565°E

École-Militaire
- Quartier de l'École-Militaire
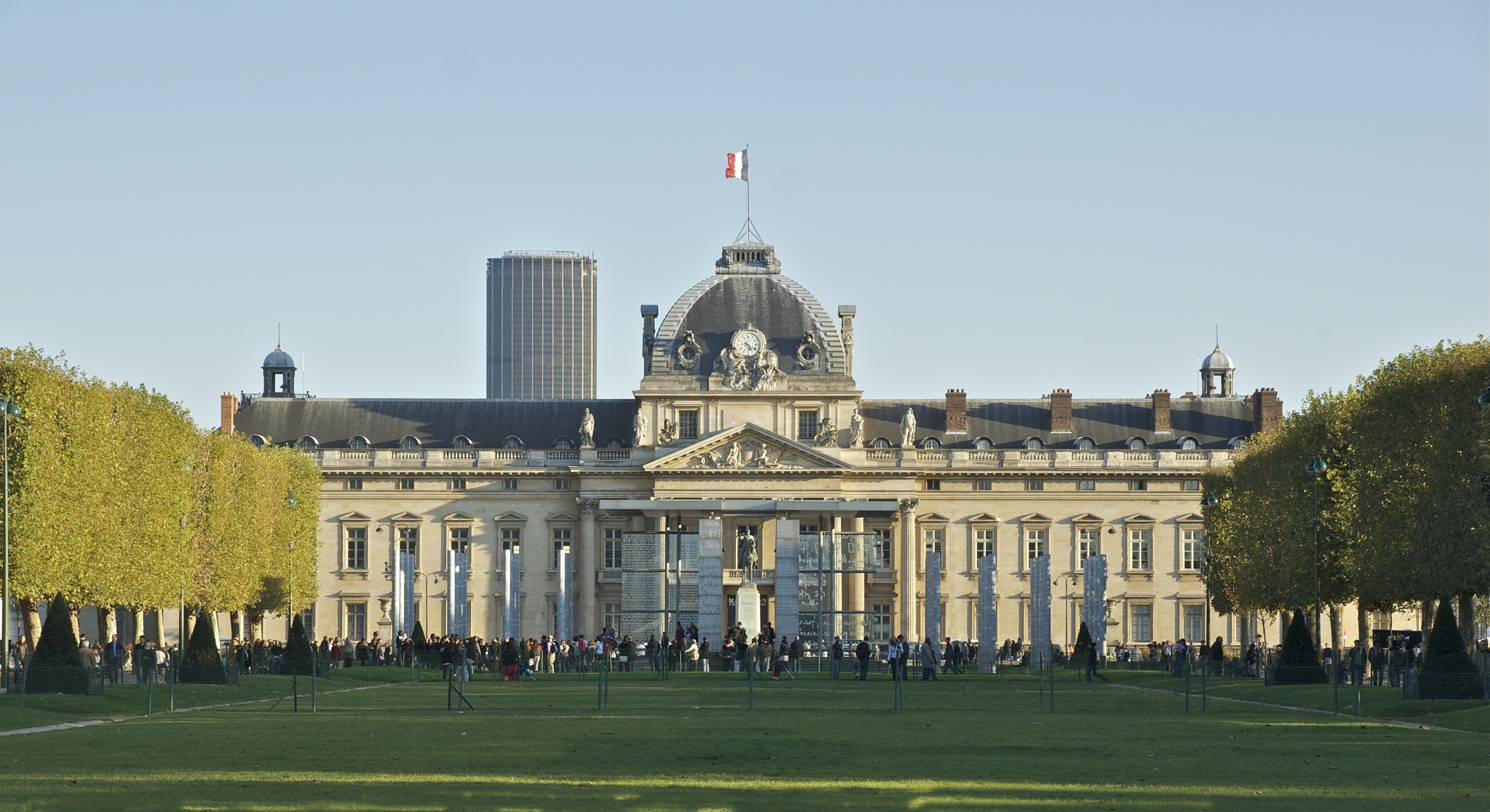
- École Militaire
- Interactive map of École-Militaire
- Country: France
- Region: Île-de-France
- Ville: Paris
- Arrondissement: 7th

Area
  - Total: 0.808 km^{2} (0.312 sq mi)

Population (2016)
  - Total: 11,809
  - Density: 14,615/km^{2} (37,850/sq mi)

The Quartier de l'École-Militaire is the 27th administrative district of Paris, located in the southern part of the 7th arrondissement.

This district takes its name from the École Militaire.

It is home to, among other institutions, the Ministries of Overseas Territories and of Health, as well as the UNESCO Headquarters and the embassies of China and Ukraine.

== Other locations ==
- Saint-François-Xavier Church
- Lavirotte Building
- Villa de Saxe
- Avenue de Breteuil
- Esplanade Jacques-Chaban-Delmas
The Quarters of the 7th arrondissement.

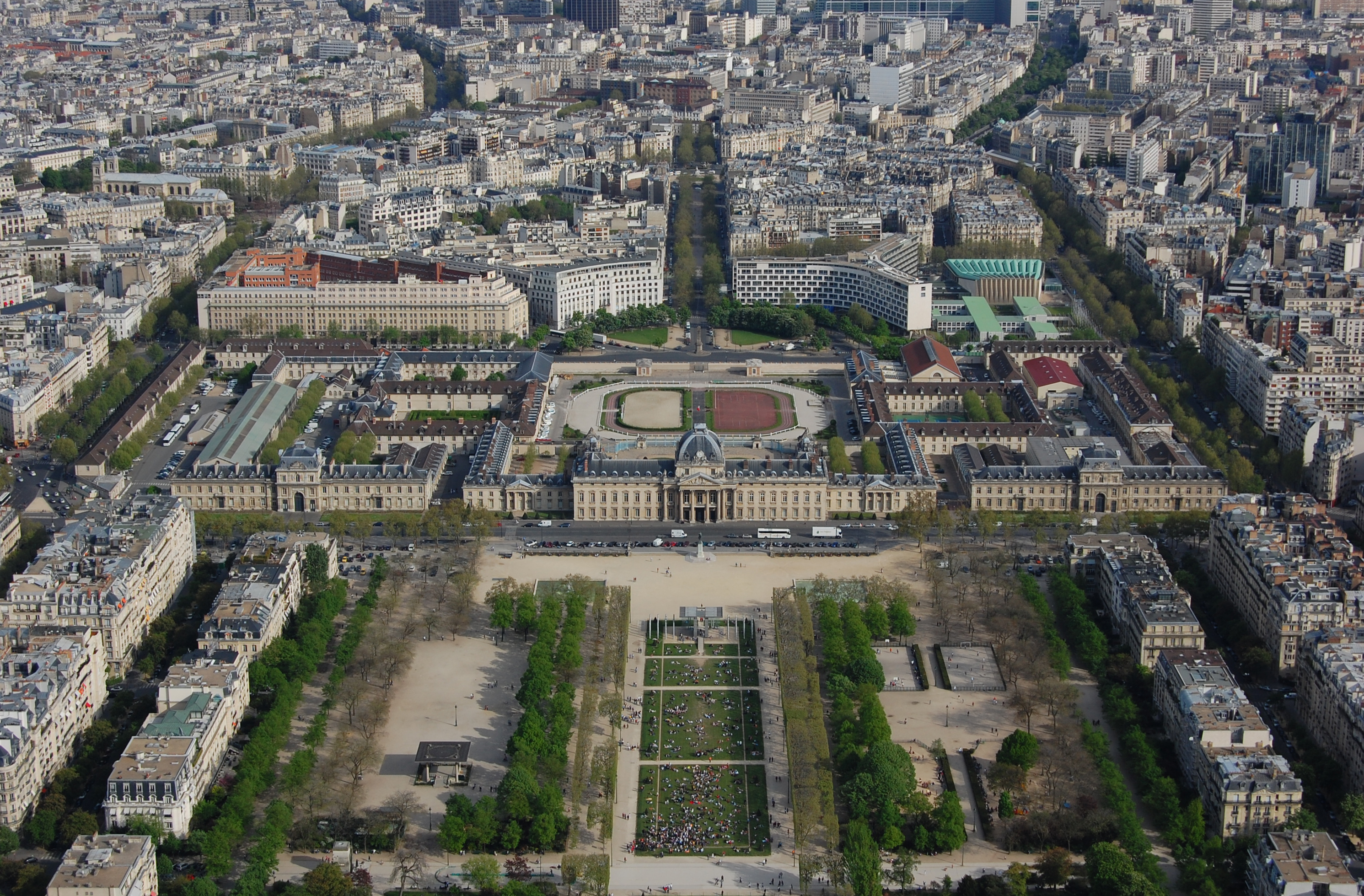
The École-Militaire district, an extension of the Champ-de-Mars.

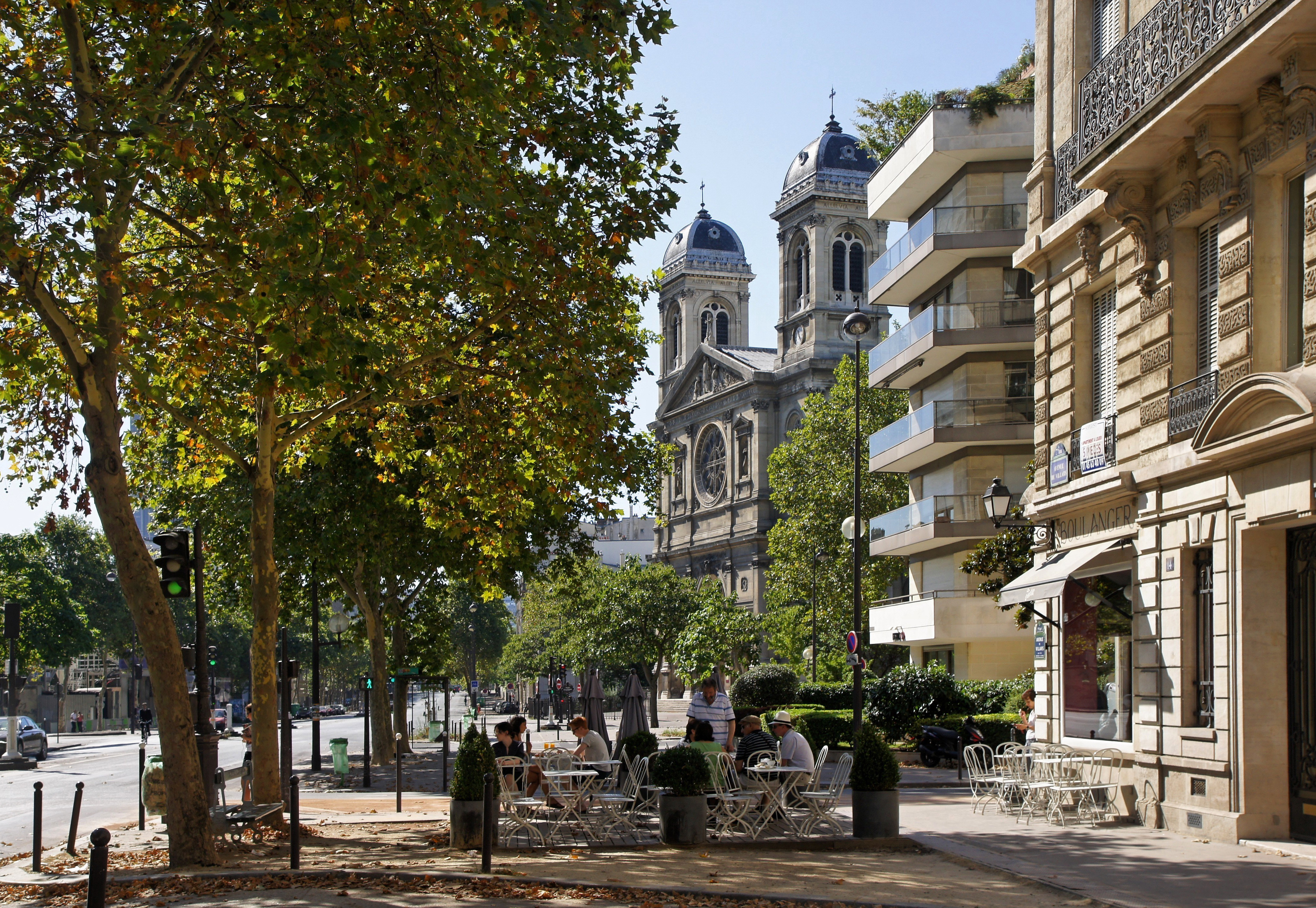
Avenue de Villars and Saint-François-Xavier Church.
