= Quartier de la Porte-Saint-Denis =

Coordinates: 48.8779157°N 2.3516312°E

Porte-Saint-Denis
- Quartier de la Porte-Saint-Denis
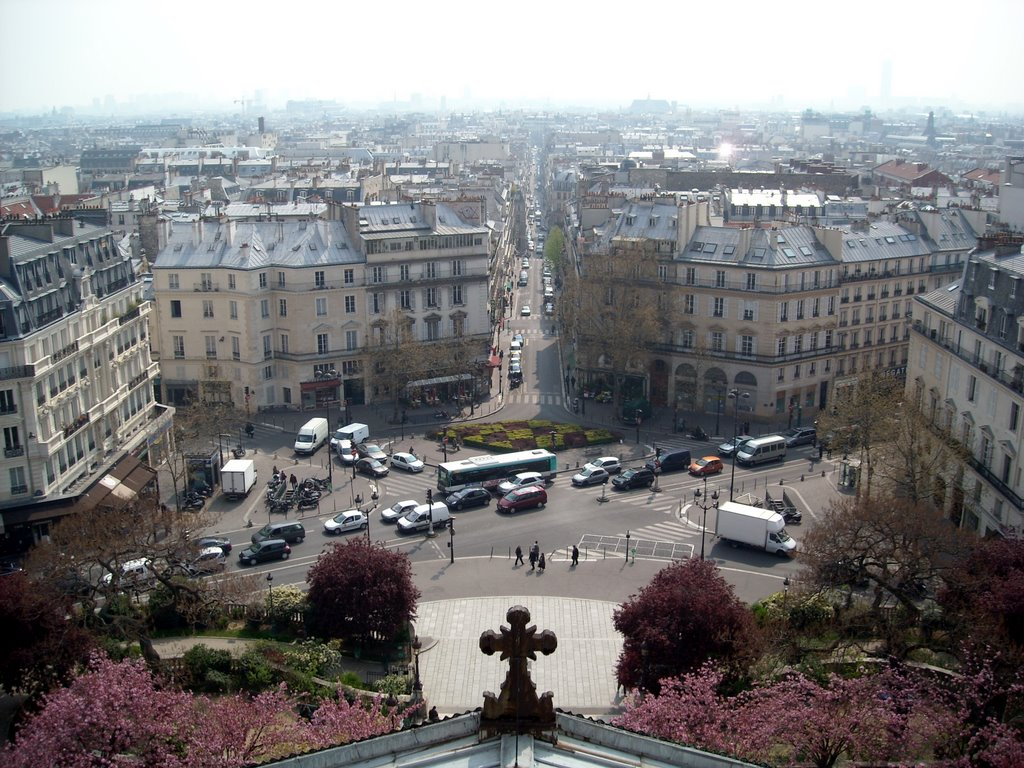
- Rue d'Hauteville
- Country: France
- Region: Île-de-France
- Ville: Paris
- Arrondissement: 10th

Area
  - Total: 0.472 km^{2} (0.182 sq mi)

Population (2016)
  - Total: 16,255
  - Density: 34,439/km^{2} (89,200/sq mi)

The Quartier de la Porte-Saint-Denis is the 38th of the 80 quarters of Paris, located in the 10th arrondissement.

The Quarters of the 10th arrondissement

== Location ==
The administrative district in the 10th arrondissement of Paris is bounded by the following streets:

- West: Rue du Faubourg-Poissonnière
- North: Rue de Chabrol
- East: Boulevard de Strasbourg
- South: Boulevard de Bonne Nouvelle and a section of Boulevard Saint-Denis

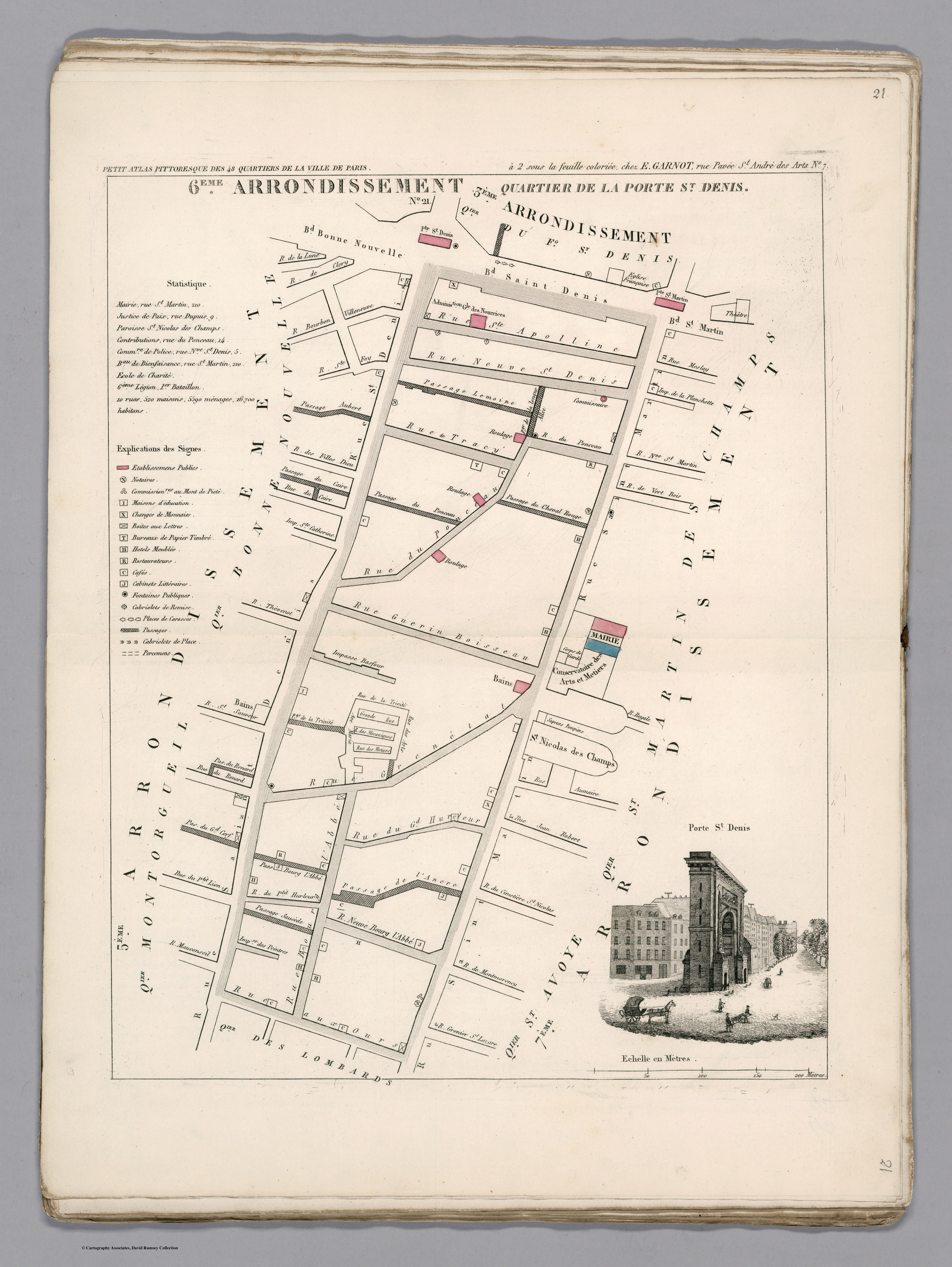
Plan of the Quartier de la Porte Saint-Denis in the former 6th arrondissement, dating from 1834

== Origin of the name ==
To the south, the porte Saint-Denis forms a "natural" gateway to the neighborhood, which is how it came to bear this name.

== Sightseeing features ==
- Porte Saint-Denis
- Théâtre du Gymnase Marie Bell
- Chocolate Museum
