= Quartier Sainte-Marguerite =

Coordinates: 48.8529562°N 2.3814787°E

Sainte-Marguerite
- Quartier Sainte-Marguerite
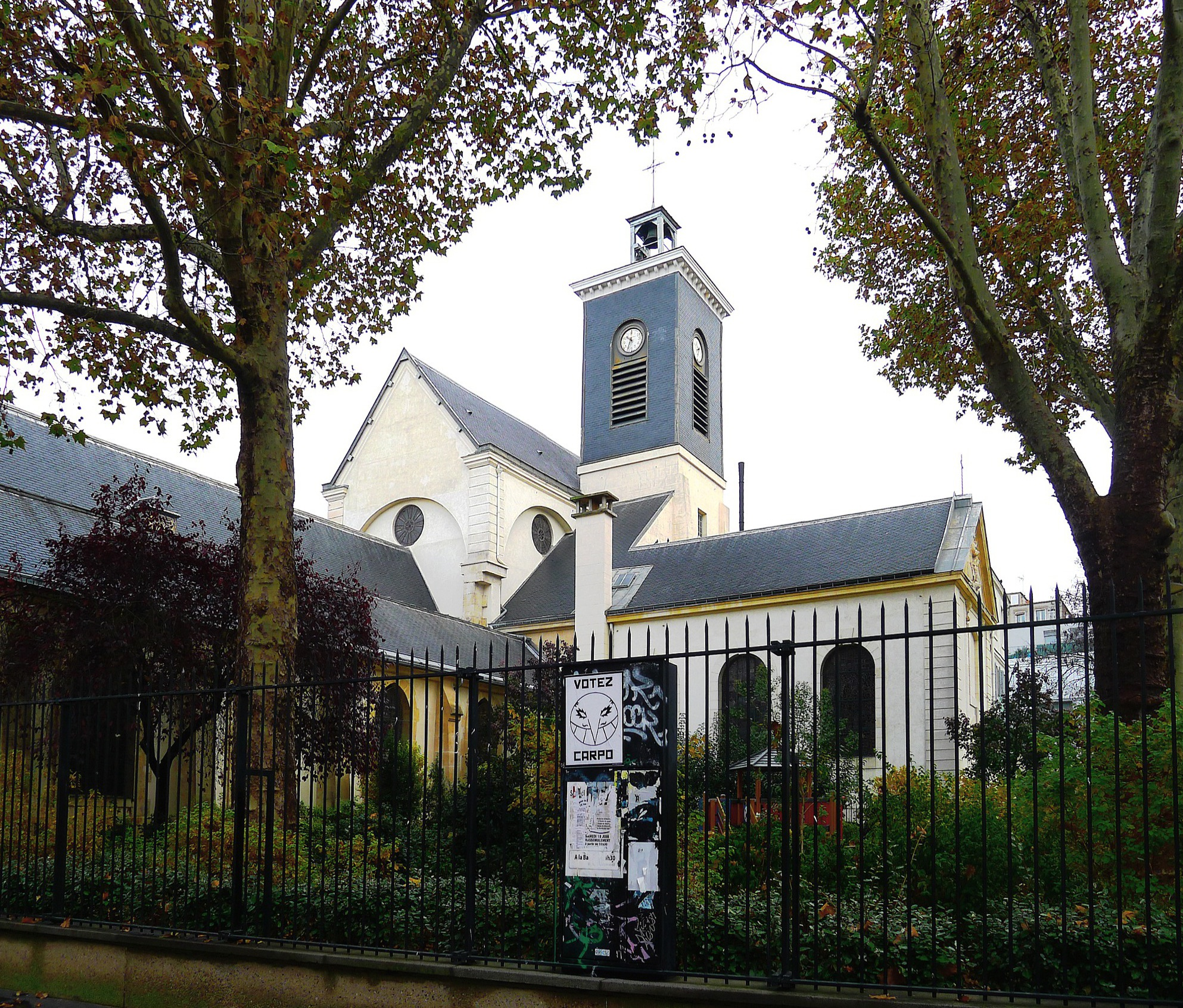
- Sainte-Marguerite, Paris
- Interactive map of Sainte-Marguerite
- Country: France
- Region: Île-de-France
- Ville: Paris
- Arrondissement: 11th

Area
  - Total: 0.930 km^{2} (0.359 sq mi)

Population (2016)
  - Total: 37,127
  - Density: 39,922/km^{2} (103,400/sq mi)

The Quartier Sainte-Marguerite is the 44th quarter of Paris, located in the 11th arrondissement.

The Quarters of the 11th arrondissement

== Geography ==
The neighborhood is bounded by Rue de Charonne—extending as far as Rue du Faubourg-Saint-Antoine—Place de la Nation, and Boulevard de Charonne.

== History ==
The neighborhood takes its name from the church of Sainte-Marguerite.

== Sightseeing features ==
There are several green spaces in the neighborhood:

- Square Louis Majorelle
- Square Raoul Nordling
- Jardin Pierre Joseph Redoute
- Jardin Émile Gallé
- Square des Jardiniers
- Square de la Place de la Nation
