= Quartier de l'Hôpital-Saint-Louis =

Coordinates: 48.8738275°N 2.3677007°E

Hôpital-Saint-Louis
- Quartier de l'Hôpital-Saint-Louis
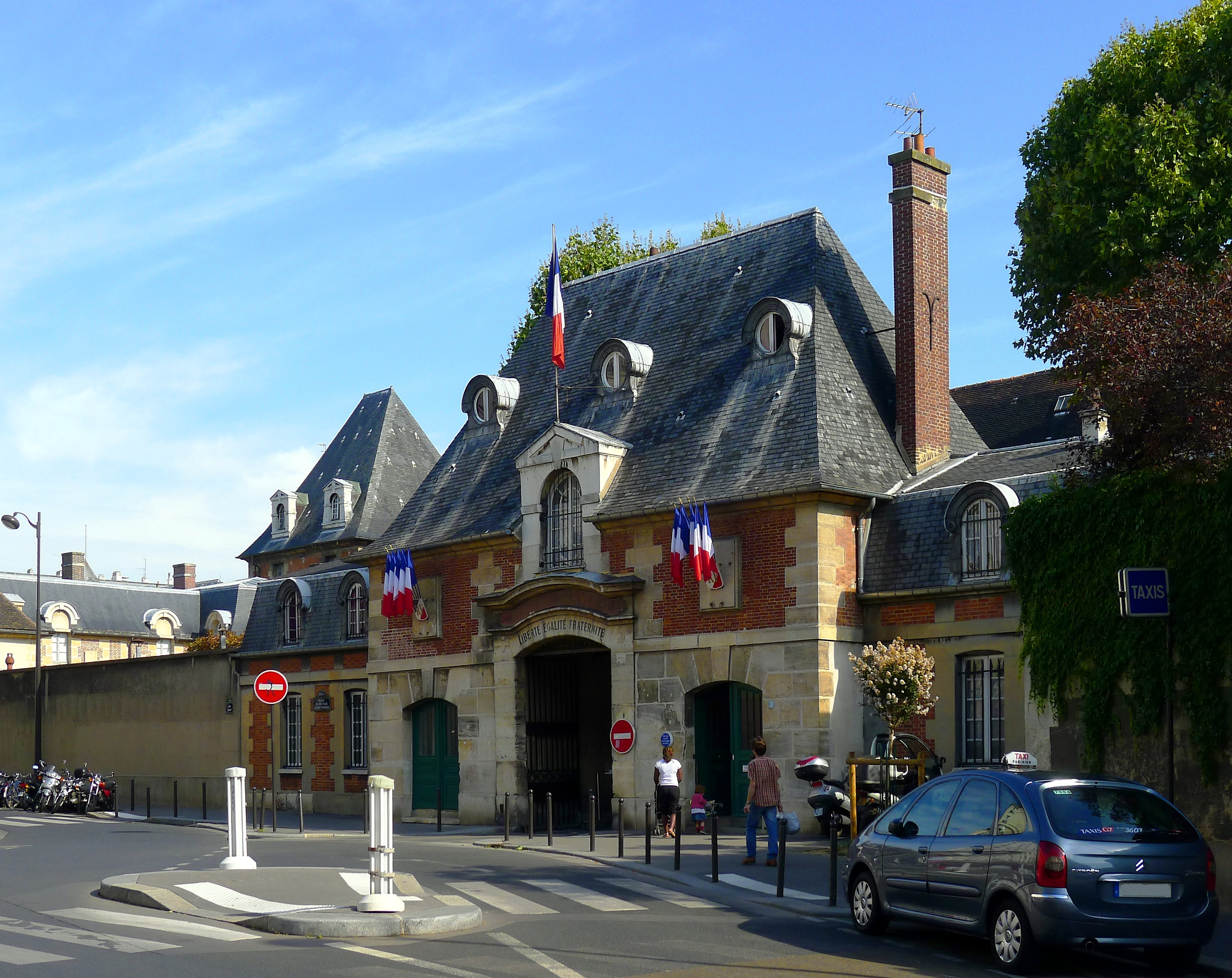
- Hôpital Saint-Louis
- Interactive map of Hôpital-Saint-Louis
- Country: France
- Region: Île-de-France
- Ville: Paris
- Arrondissement: 10th

Area
  - Total: 0.884 km^{2} (0.341 sq mi)

Population (2016)
  - Total: 29,161
  - Density: 32,988/km^{2} (85,440/sq mi)

The Quartier de l'Hôpital-Saint-Louis is the 40th administrative neighborhood of Paris, located in the 10th arrondissement.

It takes its name from the Hôpital Saint-Louis, which occupies a large area within it.

== Situation ==
Its territory is bounded (moving clockwise) by:

- to the northeast, the Place de la Bataille-de-Stalingrad;
- to the east, the Boulevard de la Villette (along its entire length);
- to the southeast, the Rue du Faubourg-du-Temple (along much of its route);
- to the southwest, the Rue Bichat and—following its alignment on the opposite bank of the Canal Saint-Martin—the Rue des Récollets (along the entire length of both streets);
- to the northwest, the Rue du Faubourg-Saint-Martin (along much of its route).

The quarters of the 10th arrondissement

== Main sites ==
=== Green spaces ===
- Jardin Villemin, and within it, the Poireau Agile community garden
- Square Amadou-Hampâté-Bâ
- Square Eugène-Varlin
- Square Henri-Christiné
- Square Juliette-Dodu
- Square Madeleine-Tribolati
- Square Raoul-Follereau

== Churches ==
- Church of Saint Joseph the Artisan, Paris
