= Quartier de l'Odéon =

Administrative quarter in Paris, France

Coordinates: 48.8522344°N 2.3392334°E

Odéon
- Quartier de l'Odéon
- Place Henri-Mondor
- Interactive map of Odéon
- Country: France
- Region: Île-de-France
- Ville: Paris
- Arrondissement: 6th

Area
  - Total: 0.716 km^{2} (0.276 sq mi)

Population (2016)
  - Total: 7,939
  - Density: 11,088/km^{2} (28,720/sq mi)

The Quartier de l'Odéon is the 22nd administrative district of Paris, located in the 6th arrondissement—primarily to the north of the Jardin du Luxembourg, which it encompasses.

Quarters of the 6th arrondissement

== History ==
The neighborhood takes its name from its proximity to the Odéon-Théâtre de l'Europe—a name that itself alludes to the word's ancient meaning: a venue for singing or, more broadly, a Greco-Roman theater. The statue standing in the center of Place Henri-Mondor depicts Danton; it is located not far from his former home and the site of his arrest during the Revolution.

== Access ==
This site is served by lines 4 and 10 at the Odéon metro station.

== Sites and monuments ==
- The Odéon Theatre
- Tarnier Hospital
- The Jardin du Luxembourg, home to the palace of the same name—seat of the Senate—as well as the Musée du Luxembourg
- The Church of Saint-Sulpice
- The Institut d'Art et d'Archéologie
- The École Nationale Supérieure des Mines
- The Faculty of Pharmacy
- The Maison d'Auguste Comte (museum)
