= Quartier de la Salpêtrière =

Coordinates: 48.83839797973633°N 2.3611392974853516°E

Salpêtrière
- Quartier de la Salpêtrière
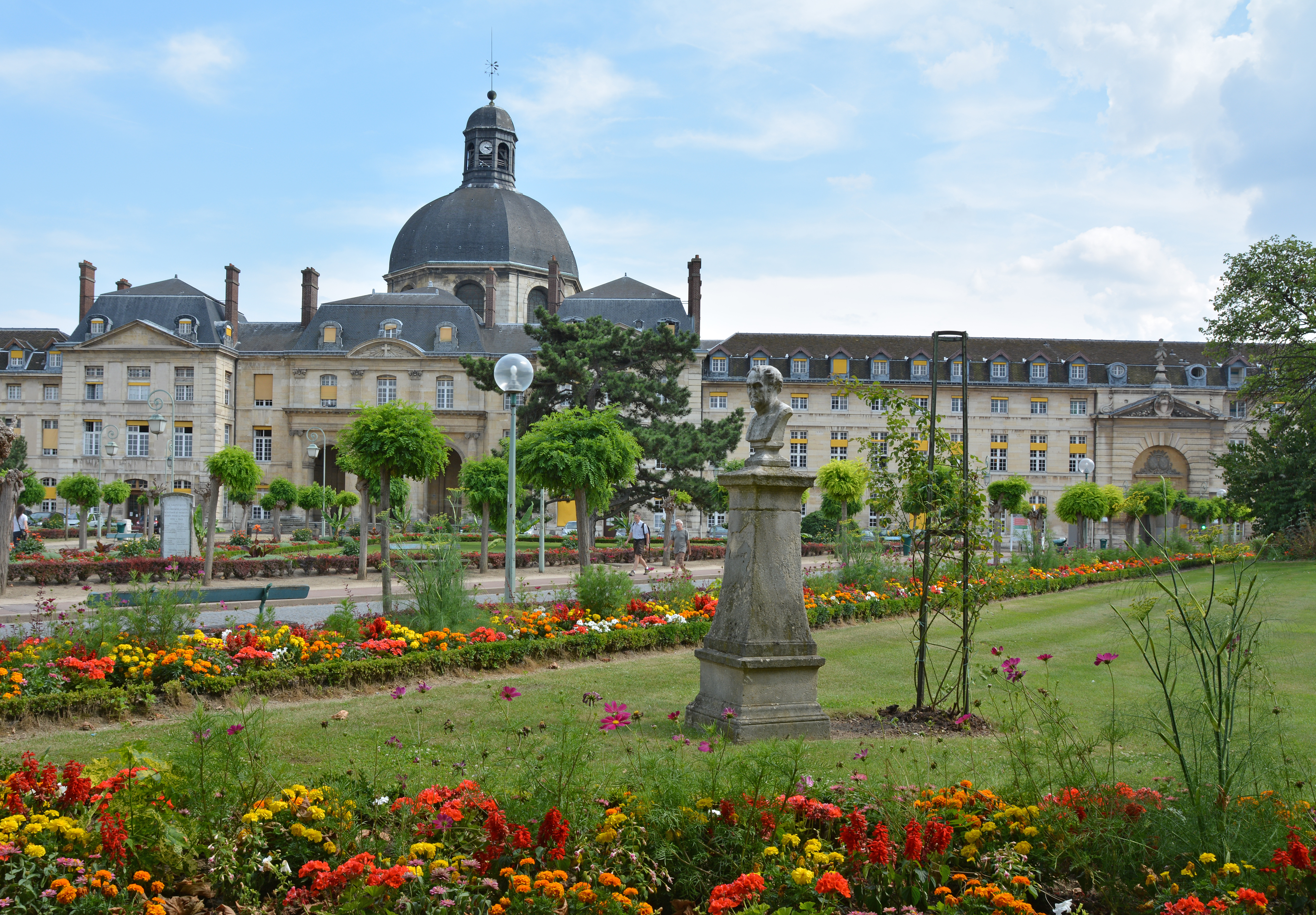
- Pitié-Salpêtrière Hospital
- Interactive map of Salpêtrière
- Country: France
- Region: Île-de-France
- Ville: Paris
- Arrondissement: 13th

Area
  - Total: 1.182 km^{2} (0.456 sq mi)

Population (2016)
  - Total: 21,678
  - Density: 18,340/km^{2} (47,500/sq mi)

The Quartier de la Salpêtrière is the 49th quarter of Paris, located in the 13th arrondissement.

== Situation ==
It is bordered to the north by Boulevard Saint-Marcel and Boulevard de l'Hôpital, to the east by the Seine, to the south by Boulevard Vincent-Auriol, and to the west by Avenue des Gobelins. This district includes, in particular, the Pitié-Salpêtrière Hospital, the Paris-Austerlitz train station, and the northern part of Paris Rive Gauche.

== Bibliography ==
- Gérard Conte, C'était hier… Le 13e arrondissement, Éditions L.M. - Le Point, 1992.
- René Dubail, D'hier à aujourd'hui. Le XIIIe arrondissement, Les Éditions municipales, 1999.
- Renaud Gagneux, Jean Anckaert et Gérard Conte, Sur les traces de la Bièvre parisienne, Éditions Parigramme, 2002, nb p.156 ISBN 978-2840962380.
- Jacques Hillairet, Dictionnaire historique des rues de Paris, Éditions de Minuit, 1985.
- Philippe Lucas, Mémoire des Rues. Paris XIIIe arrondissement, Éditions Parimagine, 2004.
- Catherine Vialle, Je me souviens du 13e arrondissement, Éditions Parigramme, 1995.

The quarters of the 13th arrondissement
