= Quartier Saint-Ambroise =

Coordinates: 48.8612992°N 2.3760991°E

Saint-Ambroise
- Quartier Saint-Ambroise
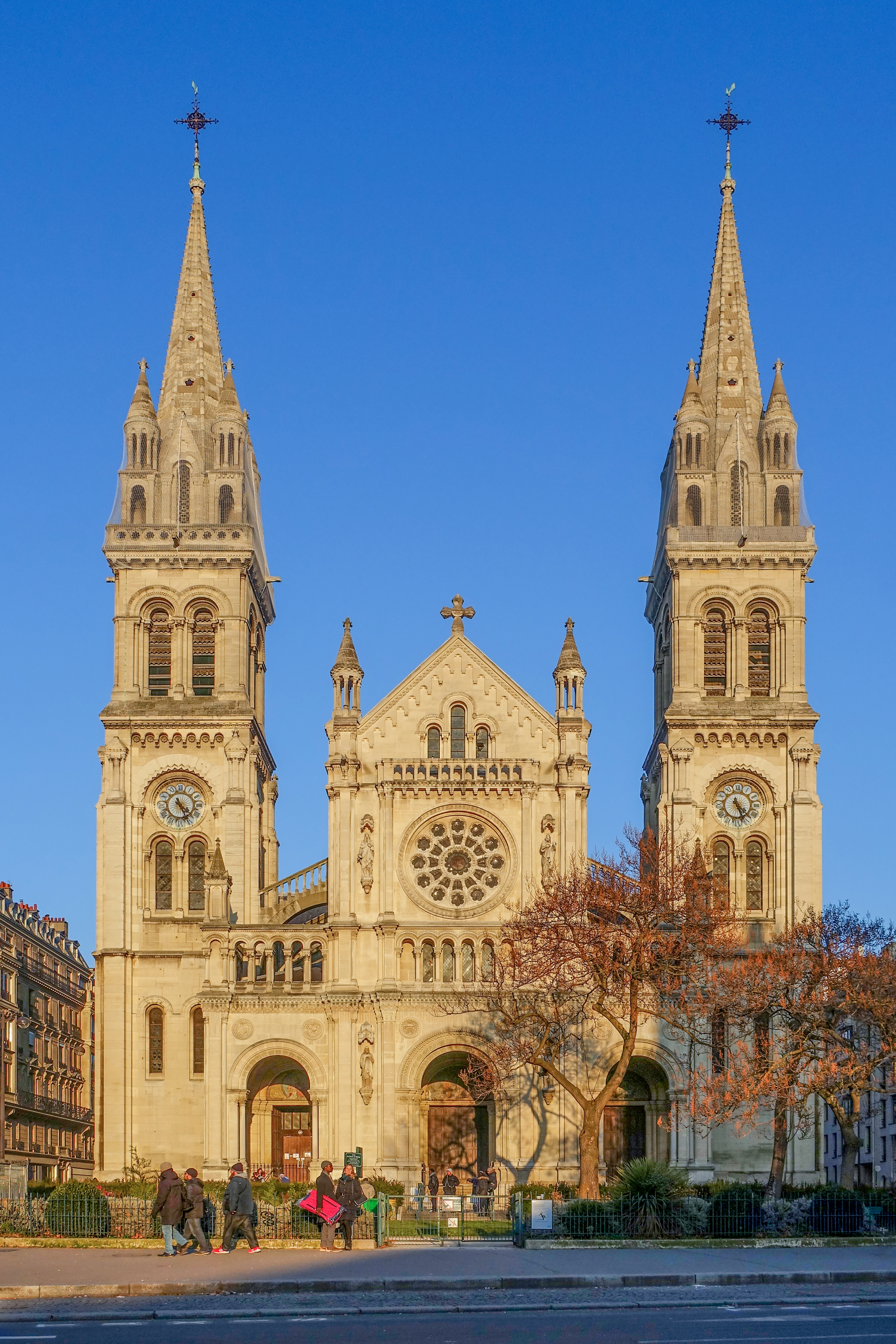
- Saint-Ambroise
- Interactive map of Saint-Ambroise
- Country: France
- Region: Île-de-France
- Ville: Paris
- Arrondissement: 11th

Area
  - Total: 0.838 km^{2} (0.324 sq mi)

Population (2016)
  - Total: 31,086
  - Density: 37,095/km^{2} (96,080/sq mi)

The Quartier Saint-Ambroise is the 42nd administrative quarter of Paris, located in the 11th arrondissement.

The Quarters of the 11th arrondissement

== Geography ==
The quarter is bounded by Rue Oberkampf, Boulevard de Ménilmontant, Rue du Chemin-Vert—extending as far as Boulevard Beaumarchais—and Boulevard des Filles-du-Calvaire.

== History ==
The neighborhood's name comes from the Church of Saint-Ambroise, which is itself named in honor of Ambrose of Milan.

== Sightseeing features ==
- Saint-Ambroise Church
- Square Richard Lenoir
- Comédie Bastille
- Atelier des Lumières
- Virtual Room
- Bataclan
- Le Passage vers les Étoiles
