= Quartier de la Monnaie =

21st administrative district of Paris

Coordinates: 48.8564015°N 2.3384956°E

Monnaie
- Quartier de la Monnaie
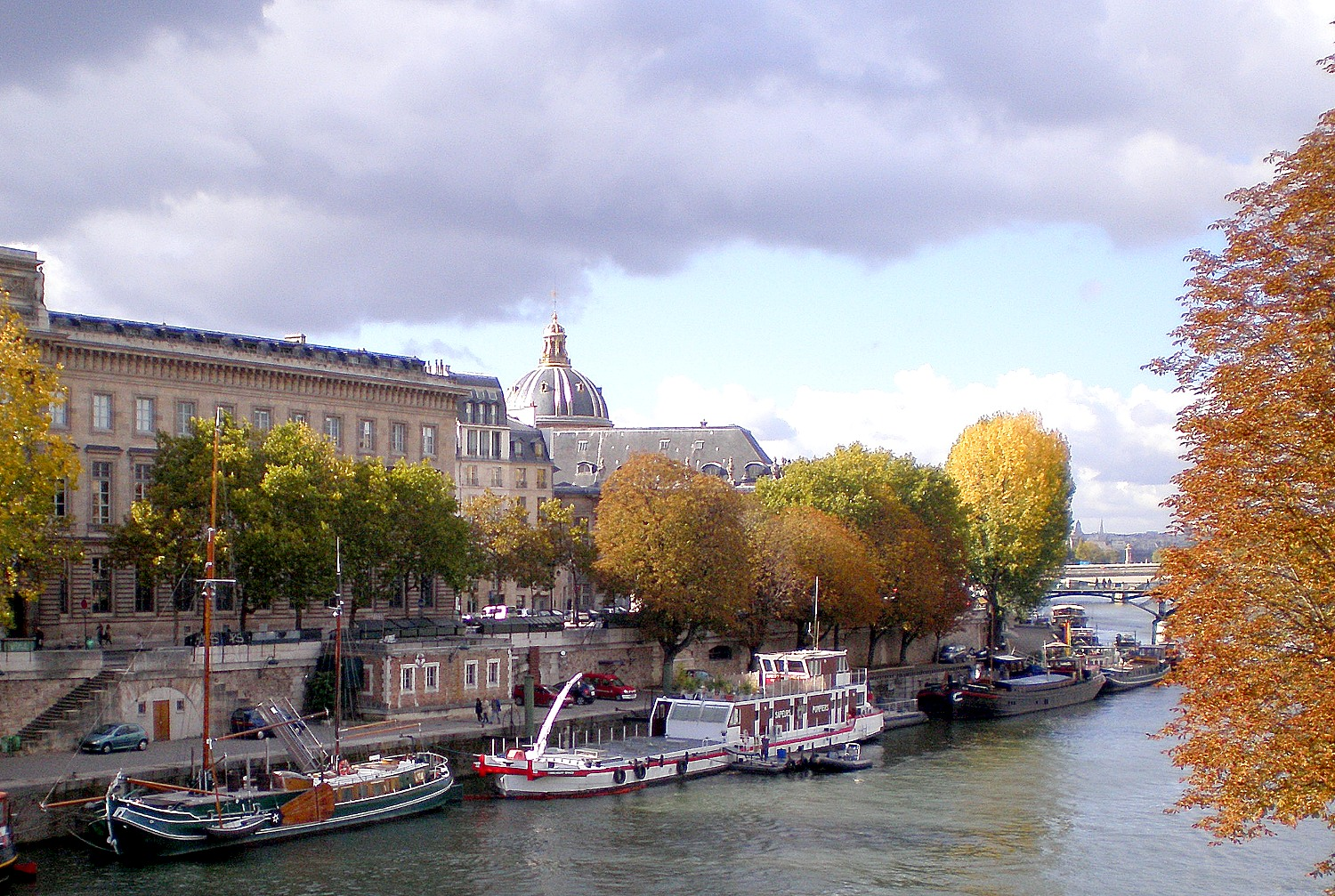
- Monnaie de Paris and Institut de France
- Interactive map of Monnaie
- Country: France
- Region: Île-de-France
- Ville: Paris
- Arrondissement: 6th

Area
  - Total: 0.293 km^{2} (0.113 sq mi)

Population (2016)
  - Total: 5,478
  - Density: 18,696/km^{2} (48,420/sq mi)

The Quartier de la Monnaie is the 21st quarter of Paris, located in the 6th arrondissement. Located in the northeast of the arrondissement, it runs along the Seine and partially to the Île de la Cité, to which it is connected by the Pont Neuf.

The Quarters of the 6th arrondissement.

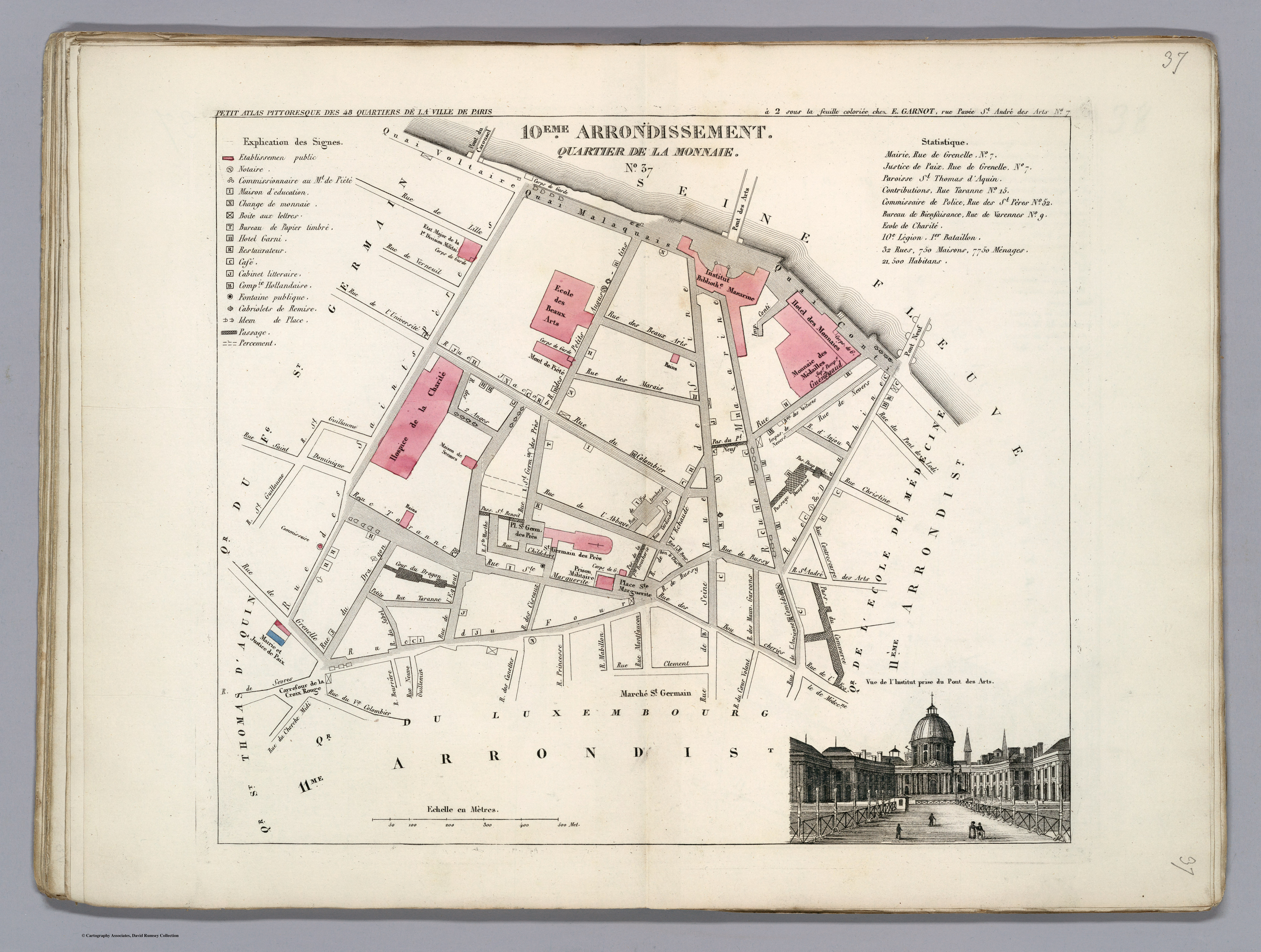
Map of the Monnaie neighborhood in the former 10th arrondissement in 1834.

== Notable buildings ==
- The Monnaie de Paris and its museum
- The Institut de France
  - Académie Française
  - Académie des Inscriptions et Belles-Lettres
  - French Academy of Sciences
  - Académie des Beaux-Arts
  - Académie des Sciences Morales et Politiques
  - Bibliothèque Mazarine
- The Beaux-Arts de Paris
- The Saint-André-des-Arts cinema
- Le Tabou (closed)
- The Café Procope
- The Lapérouse restaurant
- The Lycée Fénelon
- The La Monnaie fire station

=== Green spaces ===
- Gabriel-Pierné Square
- Honoré-Champion Square
