= Quartier de la Roquette =

Coordinates: 48.85595703125°N 2.37556529045105°E

Roquette
- Quartier de la Roquette
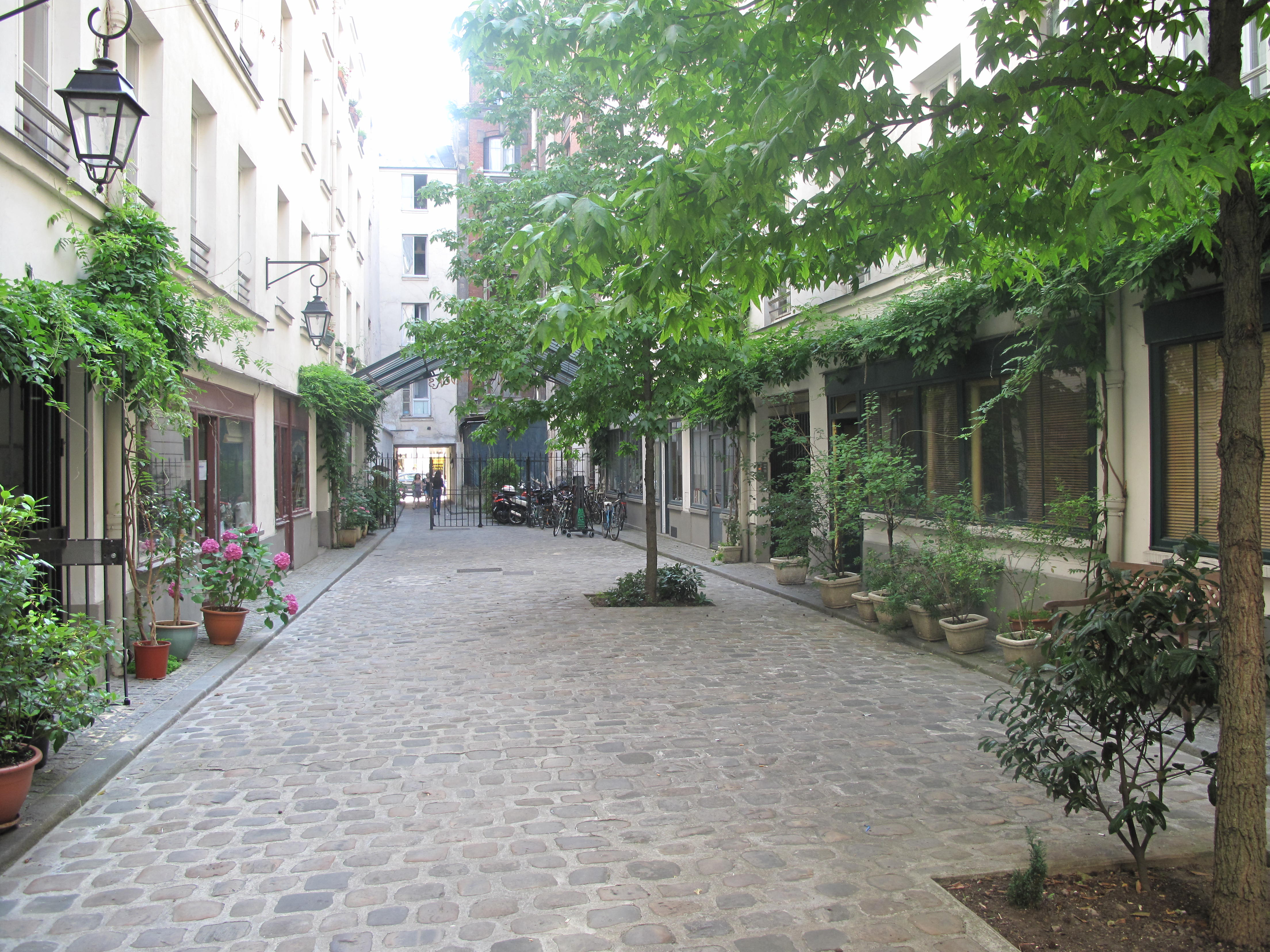
- Cours Faubourg Saint Antoine
- Country: France
- Region: Île-de-France
- Ville: Paris
- Arrondissement: 11th

Area
  - Total: 1.172 km^{2} (0.453 sq mi)

Population (2016)
  - Total: 46,427
  - Density: 39,613/km^{2} (102,600/sq mi)

The Quartier de la Roquette is the 43rd of the 80 quarters of Paris located in the 11th arrondissement.

The Quarters of the 11th arrondissement

== Location ==
The administrative district in the 11th arrondissement of Paris is bordered by the following streets:

- North West: Rue du Chemin Vert
- Northeast: Boulevard de Ménilmontant and Boulevard de Charonne
- Southeast: Rue de Charonne
- South: Rue du Faubourg Saint-Antoine to Place de la Bastille

== Name origin ==
The name of the district is probably derived from a flower that grew here and was called Rochette; The Rocquet family is probably not the namesake.

== History ==
The La Roquette district is now a socially homogeneous area, not by the dominance of a particular social class or age group, but by a good mix of the different existences, as is common throughout the 11th arrondissement: there are modest buildings, but in good condition and in a classic style, built mainly at the end of the 19th and beginning of the 20th century, with the exception of the buildings built in place of the old prison and which extend throughout the square; These were used in the 1970s and 1980s in particular to accommodate families with a migrant background. Other buildings are largely inhabited by the middle class (middle managers, civil servants, pensioners) or attract a new population (students, young active and creative people).

The district was relatively spared from the construction boom and the renovation projects of other outlying districts: the developments built after 1945 did not change the urban dynamics, the living space remained dense, commercial activity was dynamic and local craftsmanship was relatively diverse.

The middle-classization (incorrectly called “gentrification”) is strongly felt: the proximity of the Bastille-Saint-Antoine shopping centers, combined with the relatively good quality of living and the attractive location of the former workers' housing estates, has caused property prices to rise.

== Sightseeing features ==
- Place de la Bastille with the park on Boulevard Richard-Lenoir above the Canal Saint-Martin
- Square de la Roquette
