= Quarters of Paris =

Subsections of the city's administrative districts (arrondissements)

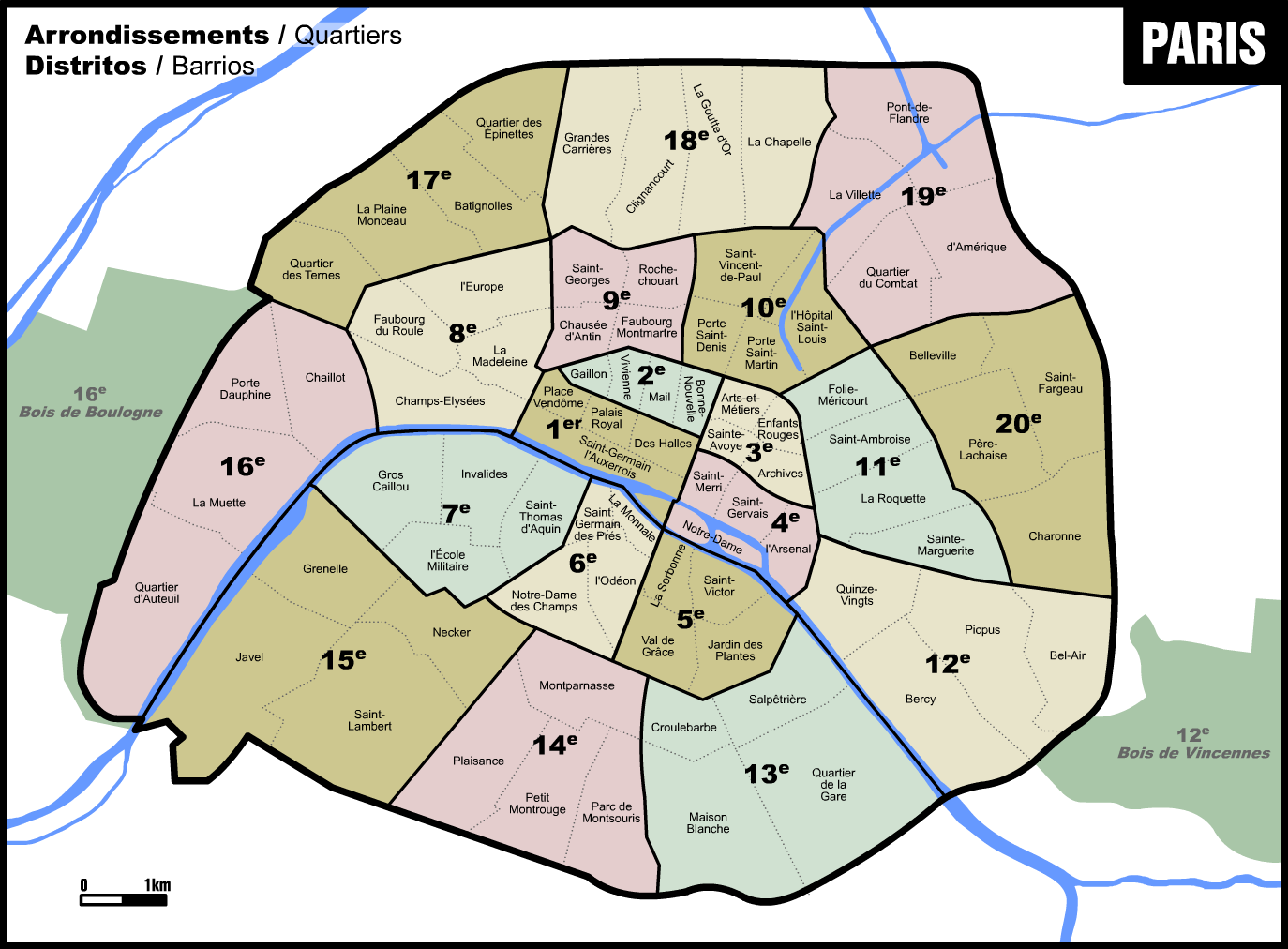
Map of the 80 administrative quarters of Paris

Each of the 20 arrondissements of Paris is officially divided into 4 quartiers. Outside administrative use (census statistics and the localisation of post offices and other government services), they are very rarely referenced by Parisians themselves, and have no specific administration or political representation attached to them.

Arrondissement (Districts)	Quartiers (Quarters)		Population (1999)	Area (hectares)	Population Density (per km^{2})	Map
1st arrondissement (Called "du Louvre")	1st	Saint-Germain-l'Auxerrois	1,672	86.9	1,924	
1st arrondissement (Called "du Louvre")	2nd	Les Halles	8,984	41.2	21,806	
1st arrondissement (Called "du Louvre")	3rd	Palais-Royal	3,195	27.4	11,661	
1st arrondissement (Called "du Louvre")	4th	Place-Vendôme	3,044	26.9	11,316	
2nd arrondissement (Called "de la Bourse")	5th	Gaillon	1,345	18.8	7,154	
2nd arrondissement (Called "de la Bourse")	6th	Vivienne	2,917	24.4	11,955	
2nd arrondissement (Called "de la Bourse")	7th	Mail	5,783	27.8	20,802	
2nd arrondissement (Called "de la Bourse")	8th	Bonne-Nouvelle	9,595	28.2	34,514	
3rd arrondissement (Called "du Temple")	9th	Arts-et-Métiers	9,560	31.8	30,063	
3rd arrondissement (Called "du Temple")	10th	Enfants-Rouges	8,562	27.2	31,478	
3rd arrondissement (Called "du Temple")	11th	Archives	8,609	36.8	23,394	
3rd arrondissement (Called "du Temple")	12th	Sainte-Avoye	7,501	21.3	35,216	
4th arrondissement (Called "de l'Hôtel-de-Ville")	13th	Saint-Merri	6,523	31.3	20,840	
4th arrondissement (Called "de l'Hôtel-de-Ville")	14th	Saint-Gervais	10,587	42.2	25,088	
4th arrondissement (Called "de l'Hôtel-de-Ville")	15th	Arsenal	9,474	48.7	19,454	
4th arrondissement (Called "de l'Hôtel-de-Ville")	16th	Notre-Dame	4,087	37.9	10,784	
5th arrondissement (Called "du Panthéon")	17th	Quartier Saint-Victor	11,661	60.4	19,306	
5th arrondissement (Called "du Panthéon")	18th	Jardin-des-Plantes	18,005	79.8	22,563	
5th arrondissement (Called "du Panthéon")	19th	Val-de-Grâce	19,492	70.4	27,688	
5th arrondissement (Called "du Panthéon")	20th	Sorbonne	9,683	43.3	22,363	
6th arrondissement (Called "du Luxembourg")	21st	Monnaie	6,185	29.3	21,109	
6th arrondissement (Called "du Luxembourg")	22nd	Odéon	8,833	71.6	12,337	
6th arrondissement (Called "du Luxembourg")	23rd	Notre-Dame-des-Champs	24,731	86.1	28,724	
6th arrondissement (Called "du Luxembourg")	24th	Saint-Germain-des-Prés	5,154	28.2	18,277	
7th arrondissement (Called "du Palais-Bourbon")	25th	Saint-Thomas-d'Aquin	12,661	82.7	15,310	
7th arrondissement (Called "du Palais-Bourbon")	26th	Les Invalides	6,276	107.4	5,844	
7th arrondissement (Called "du Palais-Bourbon")	27th	École-Militaire	12,895	80.8	15,959	
7th arrondissement (Called "du Palais-Bourbon")	28th	Gros-Caillou	25,156	138.2	18,203	
8th arrondissement (Called "de l'Élysée")	29th	Champs-Élysées	4,614	114.1	4,044	
8th arrondissement (Called "de l'Élysée")	30th	Faubourg-du-Roule	10,038	79.6	12,611	
8th arrondissement (Called "de l'Élysée")	31st	La Madeleine	6,045	76.1	7,943	
8th arrondissement (Called "de l'Élysée")	32nd	Europe	18,606	118.3	15,728	
9th arrondissement (Called "de l'Opéra")	33rd	Saint-Georges	20,850	71.7	29,079	
9th arrondissement (Called "de l'Opéra")	34th	Chaussée-d'Antin	3,488	54.3	6,424	
9th arrondissement (Called "de l'Opéra")	35th	Faubourg-Montmartre	9,233	41.7	22,141	
9th arrondissement (Called "de l'Opéra")	36th	Rochechouart	22,212	50.1	44,335	
10th arrondissement (Called "de l'Entrepôt")	37th	Saint-Vincent-de-Paul	21,624	92.7	23,327	
10th arrondissement (Called "de l'Entrepôt")	38th	Porte-Saint-Denis	15,066	47.2	31,919	
10th arrondissement (Called "de l'Entrepôt")	39th	Porte-Saint-Martin	23,125	60.9	37,972	
10th arrondissement (Called "de l'Entrepôt")	40th	Hôpital-Saint-Louis	29,870	88.4	33,790	
11th arrondissement (Called "de Popincourt")	41st	Folie-Méricourt	33,002	72.6	45,457	
11th arrondissement (Called "de Popincourt")	42nd	Saint-Ambroise	32,168	83.8	38,387	
11th arrondissement (Called "de Popincourt")	43rd	La Roquette	47,520	117.2	40,546	
11th arrondissement (Called "de Popincourt")	44th	Sainte-Marguerite	36,476	93.0	39,222	
12th arrondissement (Called "de Reuilly")	45th	Bel-Air	33,976	138.6	24,514	
12th arrondissement (Called "de Reuilly")	46th	Picpus	62,947	186.3	33,788	
12th arrondissement (Called "de Reuilly")	47th	Bercy	13,987	190.3	7,350	
12th arrondissement (Called "de Reuilly")	48th	Quinze-Vingts	25,752	123.6	20,835	
13th arrondissement (Called "des Gobelins")	49th	Salpêtrière	18,246	118.2	15,437	
13th arrondissement (Called "des Gobelins")	50th	La Gare	69,008	304.4	22,670	
13th arrondissement (Called "des Gobelins")	51st	Maison-Blanche	64,797	223.2	29,031	
13th arrondissement (Called "des Gobelins")	52nd	Croulebarbe	19,526	69.2	28,217	
14th arrondissement (Called "de l'Observatoire")	53rd	Montparnasse	18,570	112,6	16,492	
14th arrondissement (Called "de l'Observatoire")	54th	Parc Montsouris	19,793	135.7	14,586	
14th arrondissement (Called "de l'Observatoire")	55th	Petit-Montrouge	37,230	134.6	27,660	
14th arrondissement (Called "de l'Observatoire")	56th	Plaisance	57,229	178.5	32,061	
15th arrondissement (Called "de Vaugirard")	57th	Saint-Lambert	82,032	283.1	29,330	
15th arrondissement (Called "de Vaugirard")	58th	Necker	46,932	157.8	29,741	
15th arrondissement (Called "de Vaugirard")	59th	Grenelle	47,411	147.8	32,078	
15th arrondissement (Called "de Vaugirard")	60th	Javel	49,092	260.9	18,816	
16th arrondissement (Called "de Passy")	61st	Auteuil	67,967	303.0	22,431	
16th arrondissement (Called "de Passy")	62nd	La Muette	45,214	203.7	22,196	
16th arrondissement (Called "de Passy")	63rd	Porte-Dauphine	27,423	141.4	19,394	
16th arrondissement (Called "de Passy")	64th	Chaillot	21,213	142.4	14,897	
17th arrondissement (Called "des Batignolles-Monceau")	65th	Les Ternes	39,137	146.6	26,696	
17th arrondissement (Called "des Batignolles-Monceau")	66th	Plaine Monceau	38,958	138.4	28,149	
17th arrondissement (Called "des Batignolles-Monceau")	67th	Batignolles	38,691	144.2	26,831	
17th arrondissement (Called "des Batignolles-Monceau")	68th	Épinettes	44,352	137.8	32,186	
18th arrondissement (Called "des Buttes-Montmartre")	69th	Grandes-Carrières	67,152	190.6	35,232	
18th arrondissement (Called "des Buttes-Montmartre")	70th	Clignancourt	64,868	165.3	39,243	
18th arrondissement (Called "des Buttes-Montmartre")	71st	Goutte-d'Or	28,524	109.0	26,169	
18th arrondissement (Called "des Buttes-Montmartre")	72nd	La Chapelle	24,037	134.8	17,832	
19th arrondissement (Called "des Buttes-Chaumont")	73rd	La Villette	53,650	128.6	41,718	
19th arrondissement (Called "des Buttes-Chaumont")	74th	Pont-de-Flandre	24,584	237.7	10,342	
19th arrondissement (Called "des Buttes-Chaumont")	75th	Amérique	55,365	183.6	30,155	
19th arrondissement (Called "des Buttes-Chaumont")	76th	Combat	38,988	129.5	30,107	
20th arrondissement (Called "de Ménilmontant")	77th	Belleville	35,773	80.7	44,328	
20th arrondissement (Called "de Ménilmontant")	78th	Saint-Fargeau	42,087	148.7	28,303	
20th arrondissement (Called "de Ménilmontant")	79th	Père-Lachaise	42,332	159.9	26,474	
20th arrondissement (Called "de Ménilmontant")	80th	Charonne	62,901	209.1	30,082	

== Bibliography ==
- Robson, W. A. (2013-09-05). Great Cities of the World: Their government, Politics and Planning. Routledge. p. 459. ISBN 9781135672478.
