= Le Tallec =

- Pronunciation: pronounced [lœ ˈtɑːlek]

Origin
- Origin: Breton
- Meaning: one who has a large forehead.
- Region of origin: Brittany

Le Tallec is a French surname. Notable people with the surname include:

Tallec derives from talek which means someone with a large forehead in Breton. (cf. tal)

- Camille Le Tallec (1906–1991), French ceramist and artist
- Anthony Le Tallec (born 1984), French football player
- Damien Le Tallec (born 1990), French football player

== See also ==
- Le Tallec's marks
- Le Tallec's patterns
