= Quartier des Quinze-Vingts =

Coordinates: 48.85045623779297°N 2.3717164993286133°E

Quinze-Vingts
- Quartier des Quinze-Vingts
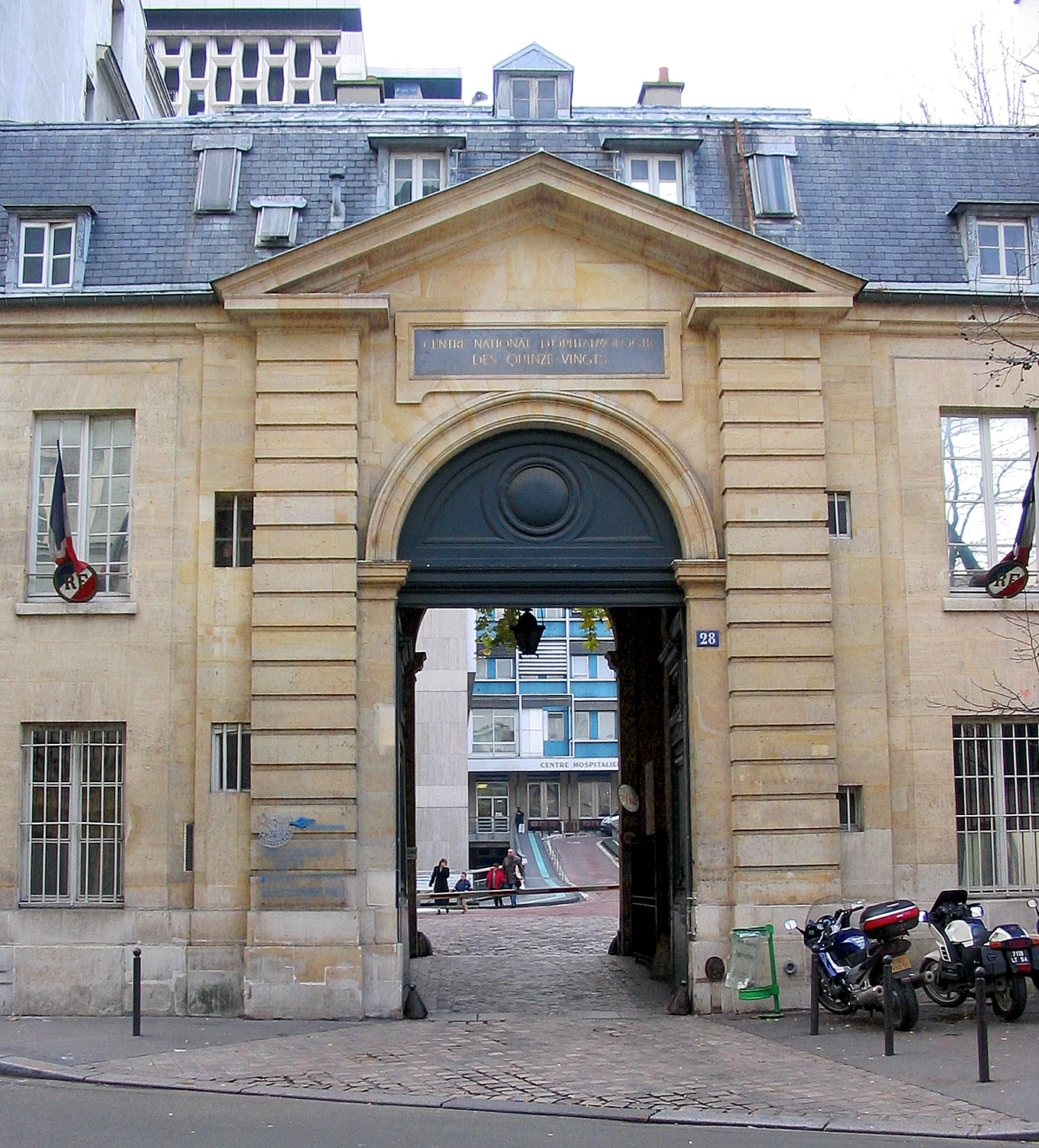
- Quinze-Vingts National Ophthalmology Hospital
- Interactive map of Quinze-Vingts
- Country: France
- Region: Île-de-France
- Ville: Paris
- Arrondissement: 12th

Area
  - Total: 1.236 km^{2} (0.477 sq mi)

Population (2016)
  - Total: 26,136
  - Density: 21,146/km^{2} (54,770/sq mi)

The Quartier des Quinze-Vingts is the 48th quarter of Paris, located in the 12th arrondissement. It takes its name from the Quinze-Vingts hospital.

== Location ==
The Quinze-Vingts neighborhood is located along the Seine, bordered by the Picpus and Bercy neighborhoods to the east, the 4th arrondissement to the west, and the 11th arrondissement to the north.

At the northern tip of the neighborhood lies the Place de la Bastille. From this point, the boundary is marked by the Boulevard Bourdon to the west and the Rue du Faubourg Saint-Antoine to the north. The Seine flows to the southwest. To the east, the boundary is formed by the Rue Villiot (which passes beneath the railway bridge of the Gare de Lyon), the Rue de Rambouillet—extending as far as the Place du Colonel Bourgoin—and subsequently the Rue Chaligny.

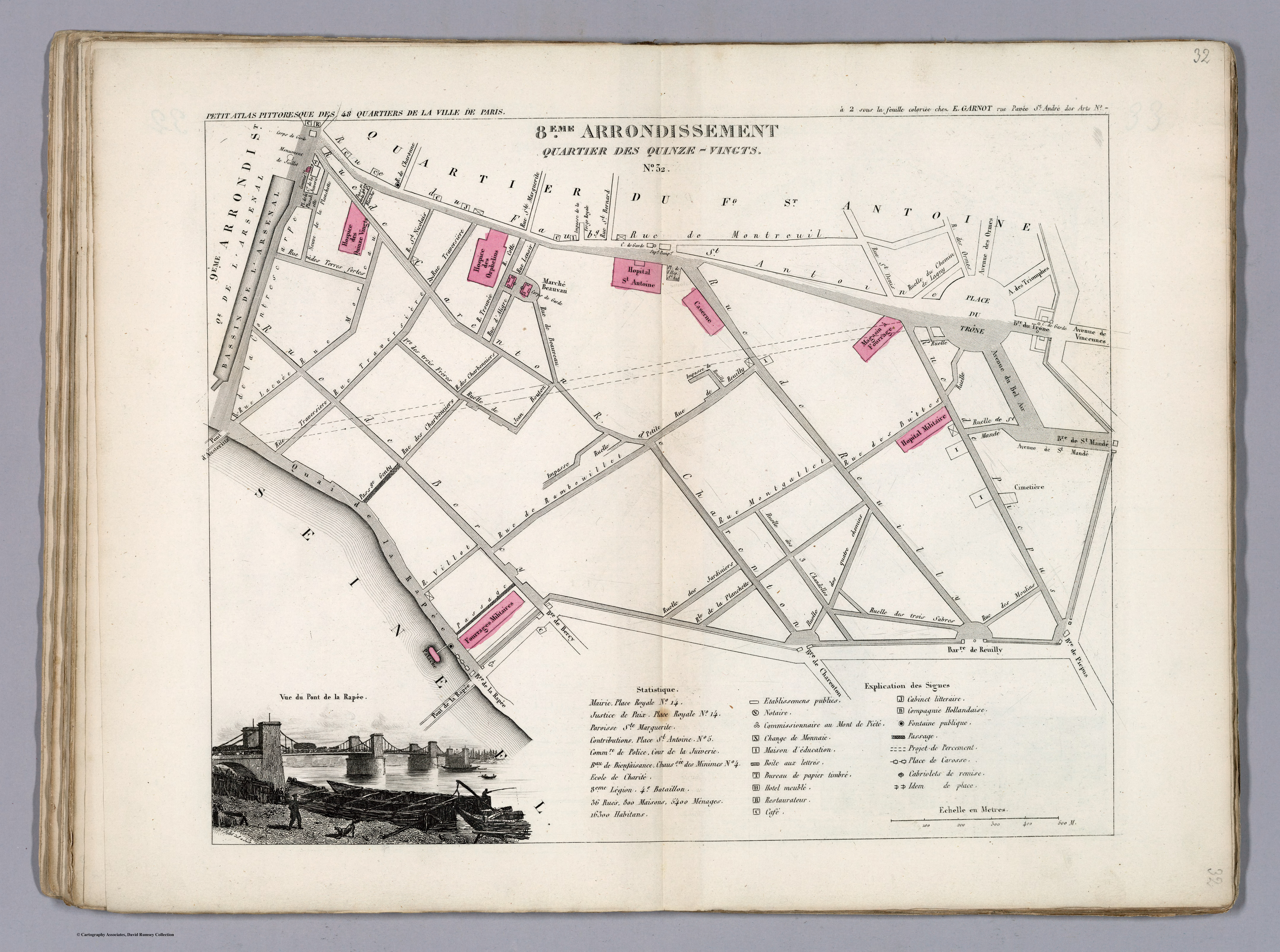
Map of the Quartier des Quinze-Vingts in the former 8th arrondissement, 1834.

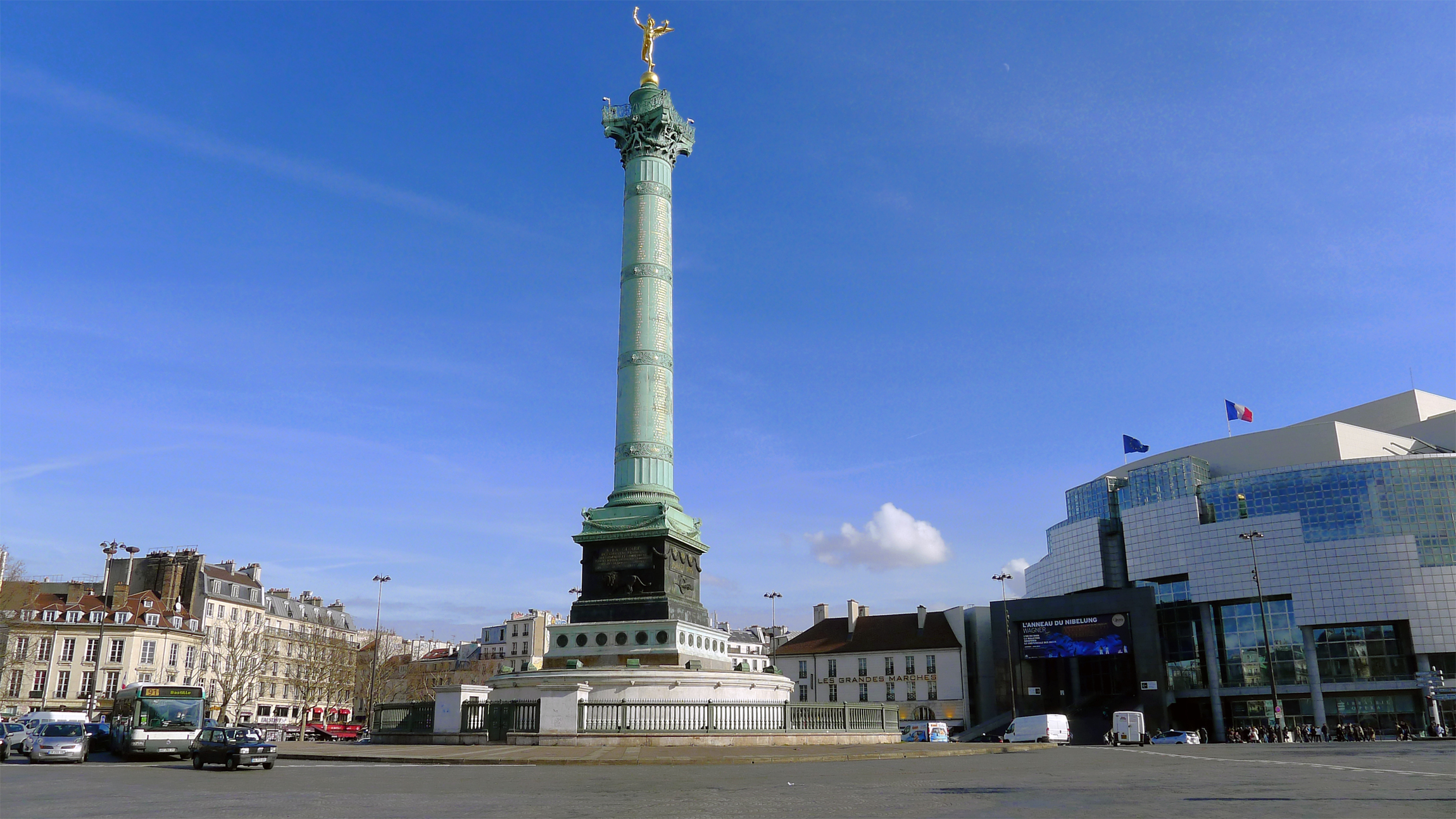
The July Column and the Opéra Bastille as seen from the 4th arrondissement.

== History ==
A section of the Quinze-Vingts operated in this neighborhood during the Revolution.

== Notable buildings and sites of memory ==
- Place de la Bastille, the July Column, and the Opéra Bastille.
- Gare de Lyon (Le Train Bleu) and the Bassin de l'Arsenal.
- The Quinze-Vingts Hospital and the Saint-Antoine Hospital.
- The church of Saint-Antoine-des-Quinze-Vingts.
- The Viaduc des Arts and the Coulée verte René-Dumont.
- Place d'Aligre with its markets—the Rue d'Aligre market and the Marché Beauvau.
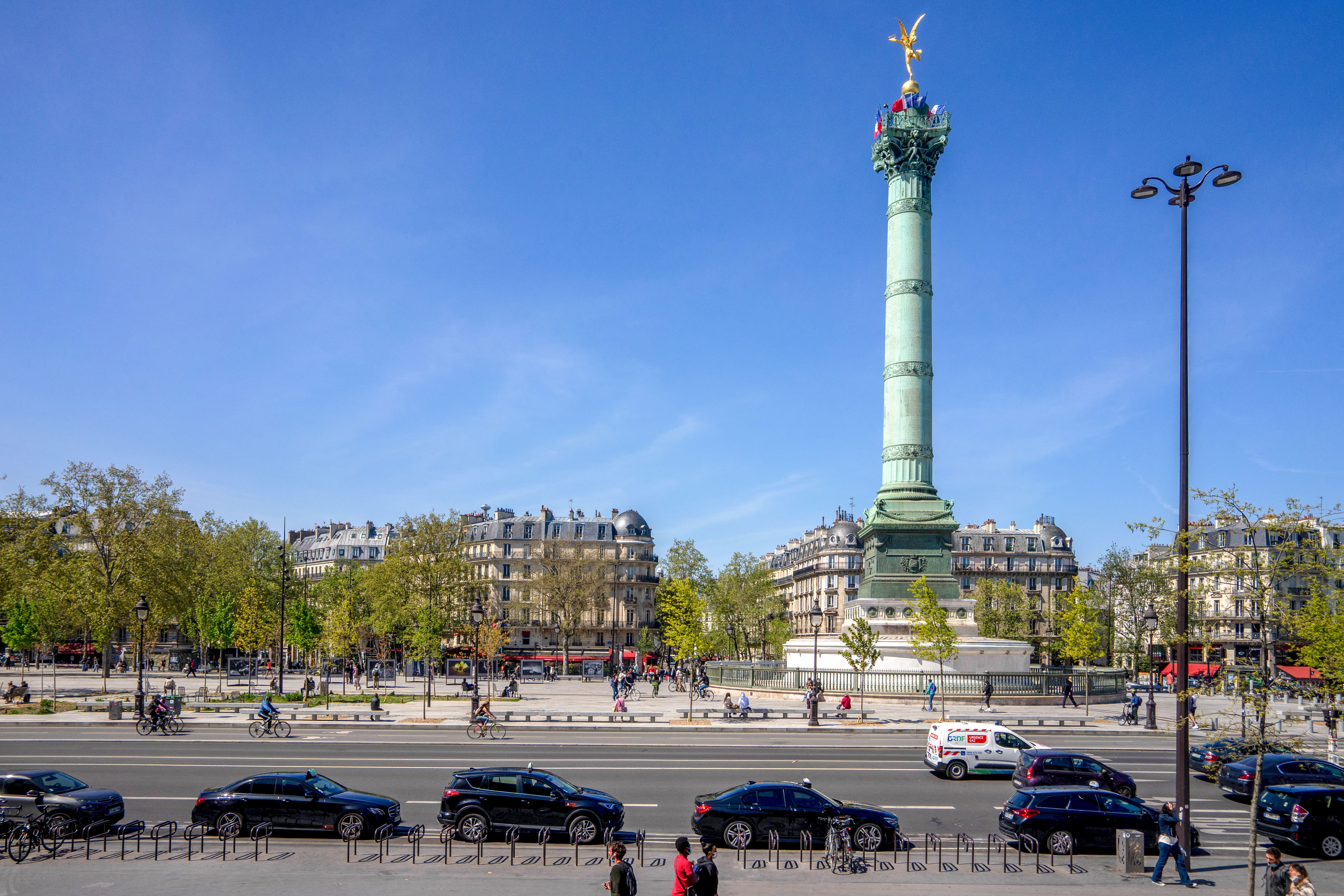
Place de la Bastille in 2021.

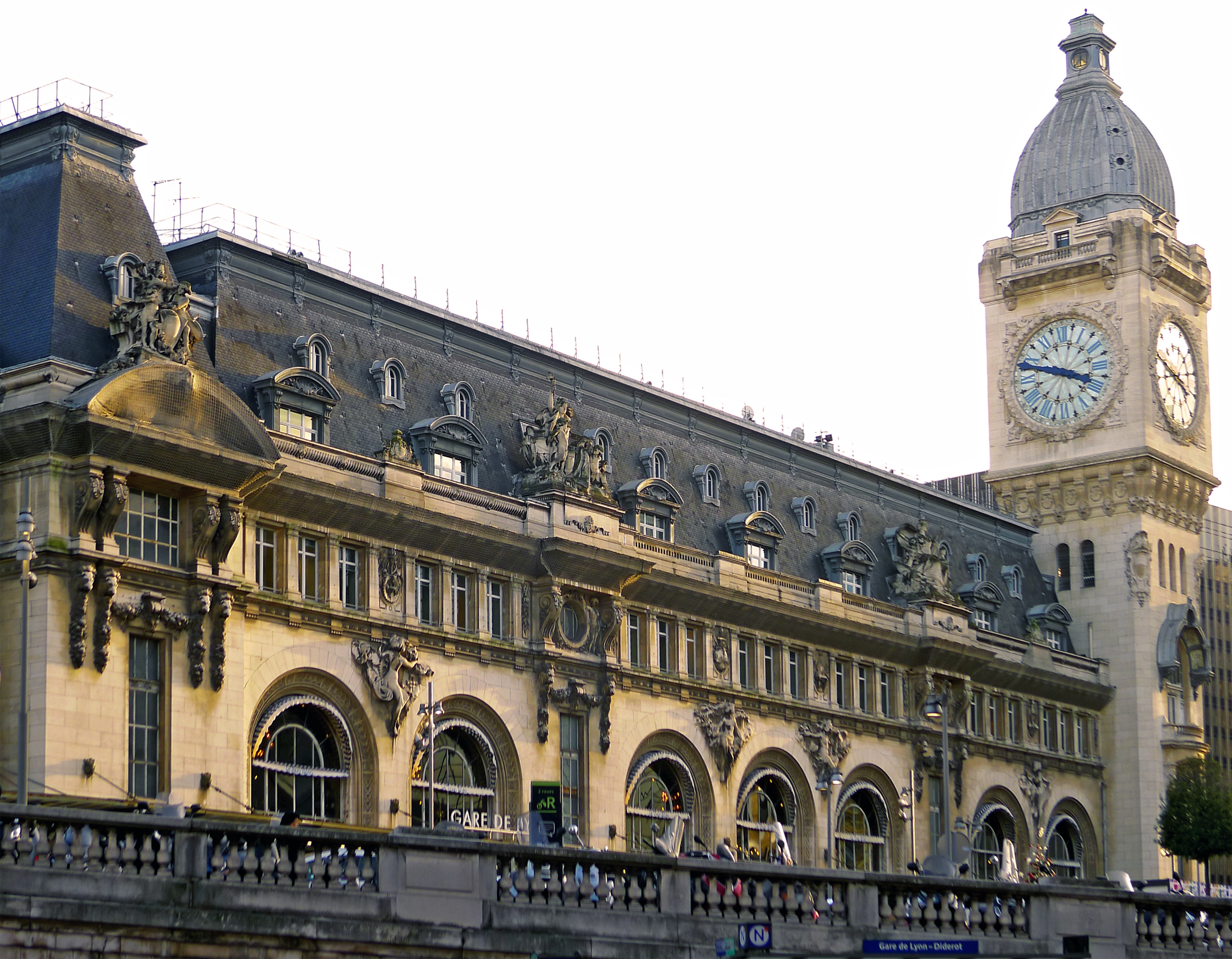
The Gare de Lyon.

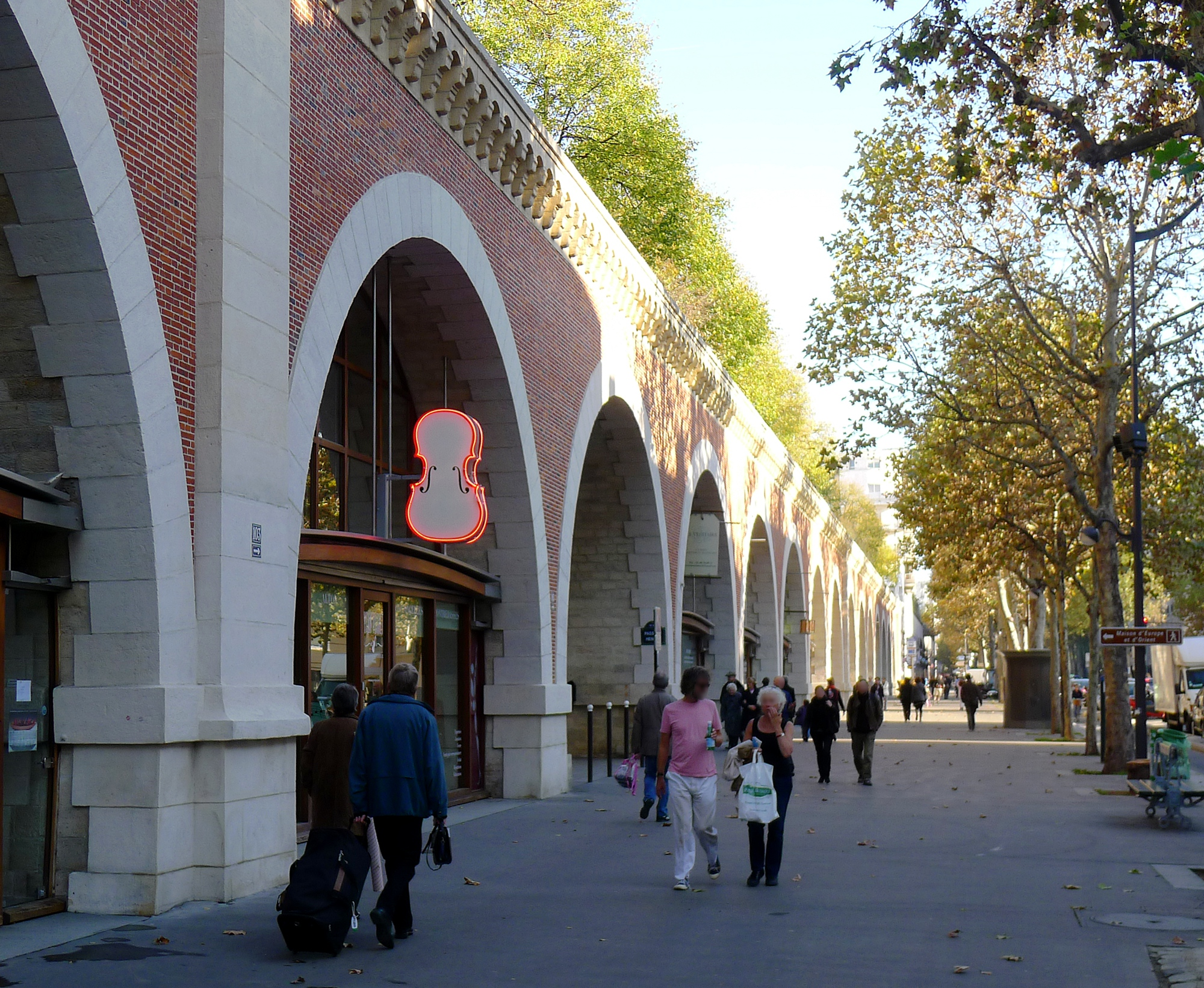
The viaduc des Arts.

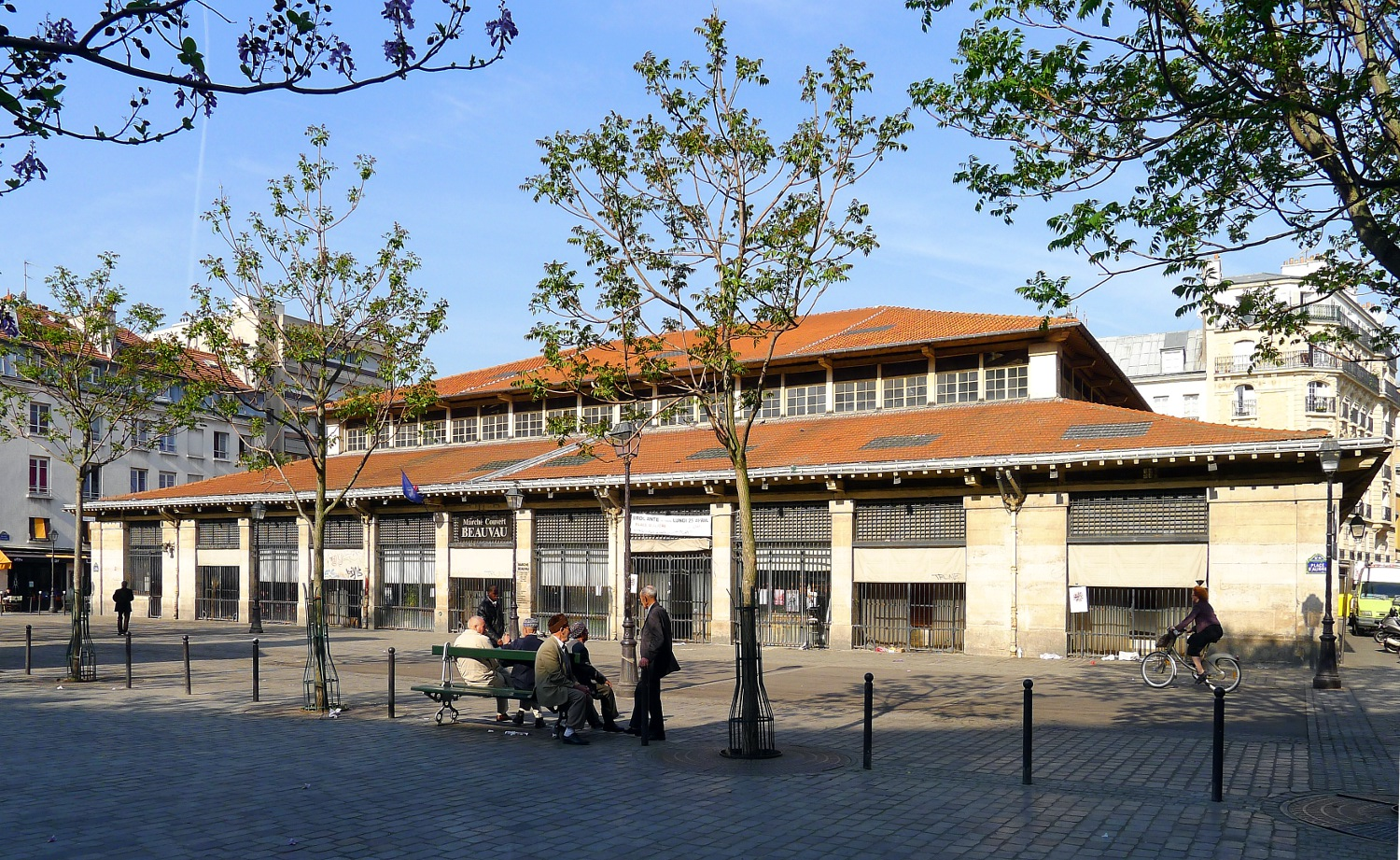
The Marché Beauvau.
