= Viaduct =

Multiple-span bridge crossing an extended lower area

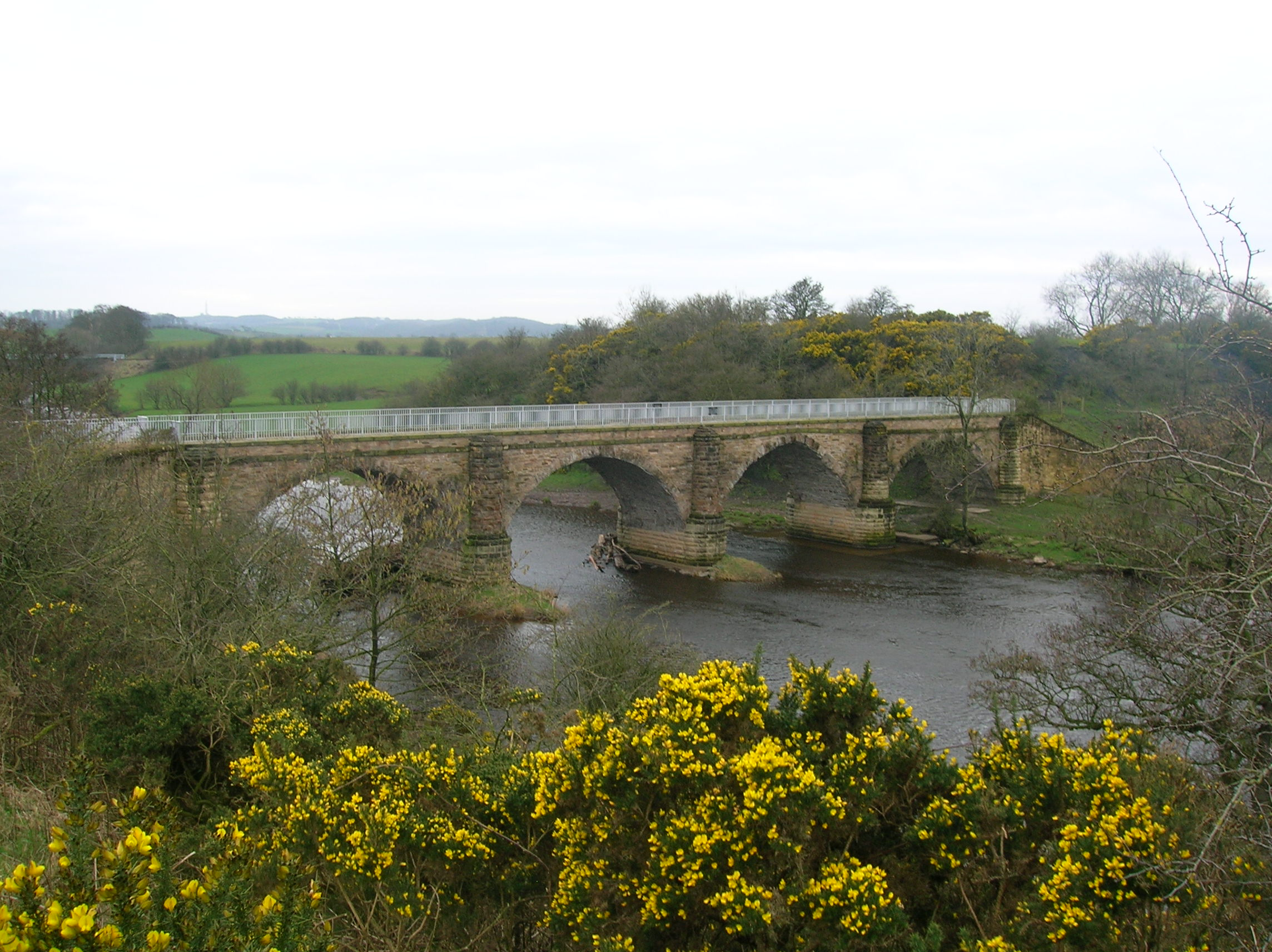
- The 1812 Laigh Milton Viaduct in Ayrshire – the oldest surviving railway bridge in Scotland
- Span range: Short (multiple)
- Material: reinforced concrete, prestressed concrete, masonry
- Movable: No
- Design effort: medium
- Falsework required: available for use, since viaducts are all composed of low bridges.

A viaduct is a bridge that consists of a series of arches, piers or columns supporting a long elevated railway or road. Typically a viaduct connects two points of roughly equal elevation, allowing direct overpass across a wide valley, road, river, or other low-lying terrain features and obstacles. The term viaduct is derived from the Latin via meaning "road", and ducere meaning "to lead". It is a 19th-century derivation from an analogy with ancient Roman aqueducts. Like the Roman aqueducts, many early viaducts comprised a series of arches of roughly equal length.

== Over land ==
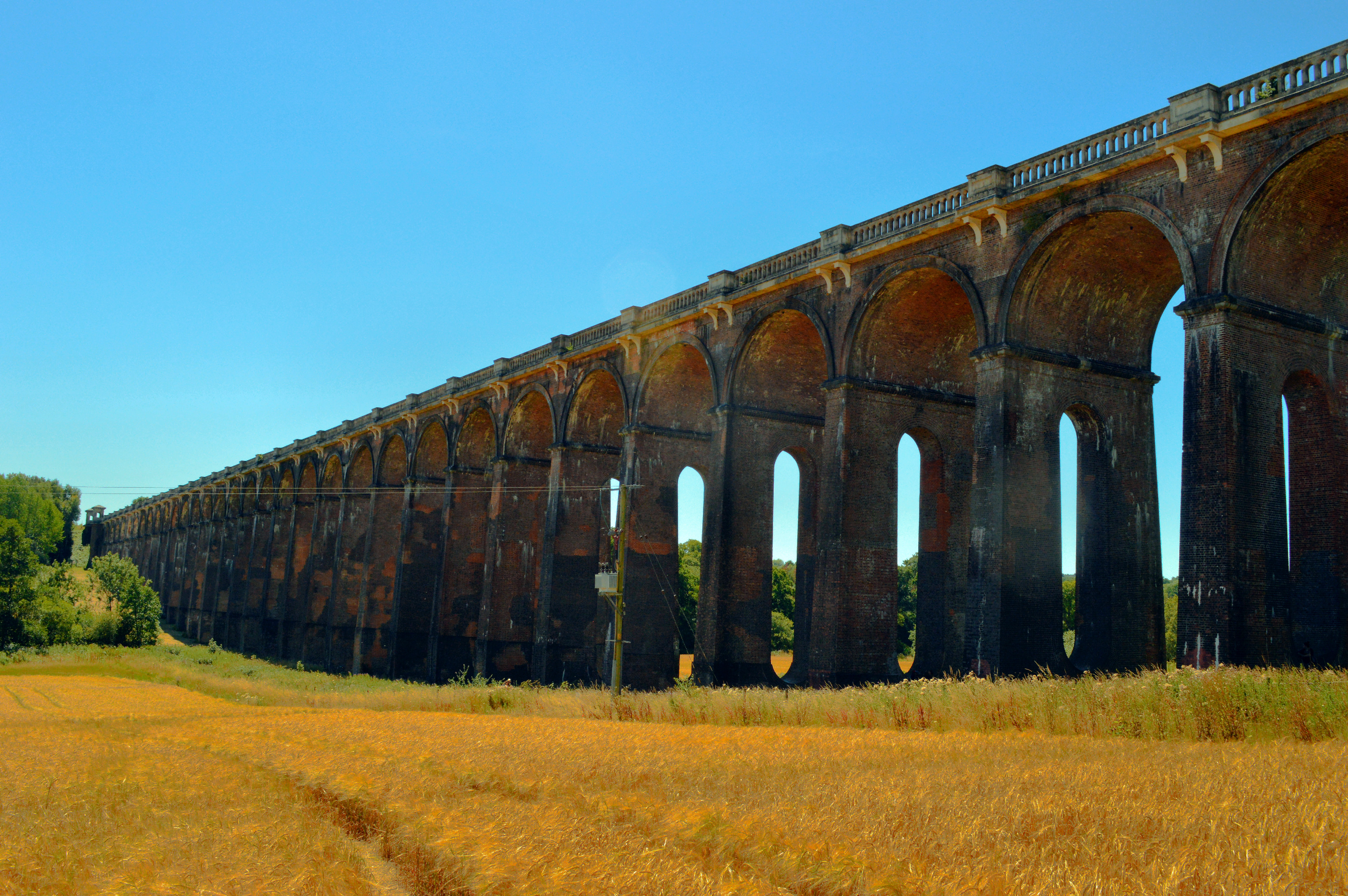
The Ouse Valley Viaduct in Sussex, England

The longest viaduct in antiquity may have been the Pont Serme which crossed wide marshes in southern France. At its longest point, it measured 2,679 meters with a width of 22 meters.

Viaducts are commonly used in many cities that are railroad hubs, such as Chicago, Birmingham, London and Manchester. These viaducts cross the large railroad yards that are needed for freight trains there, and also cross the multi-track railroad lines that are needed for heavy rail traffic. These viaducts provide grade separation and keep highway and city street traffic from having to be continually interrupted by the train traffic. Likewise, some viaducts carry railroads over large valleys, or they carry railroads over cities with many cross-streets and avenues.

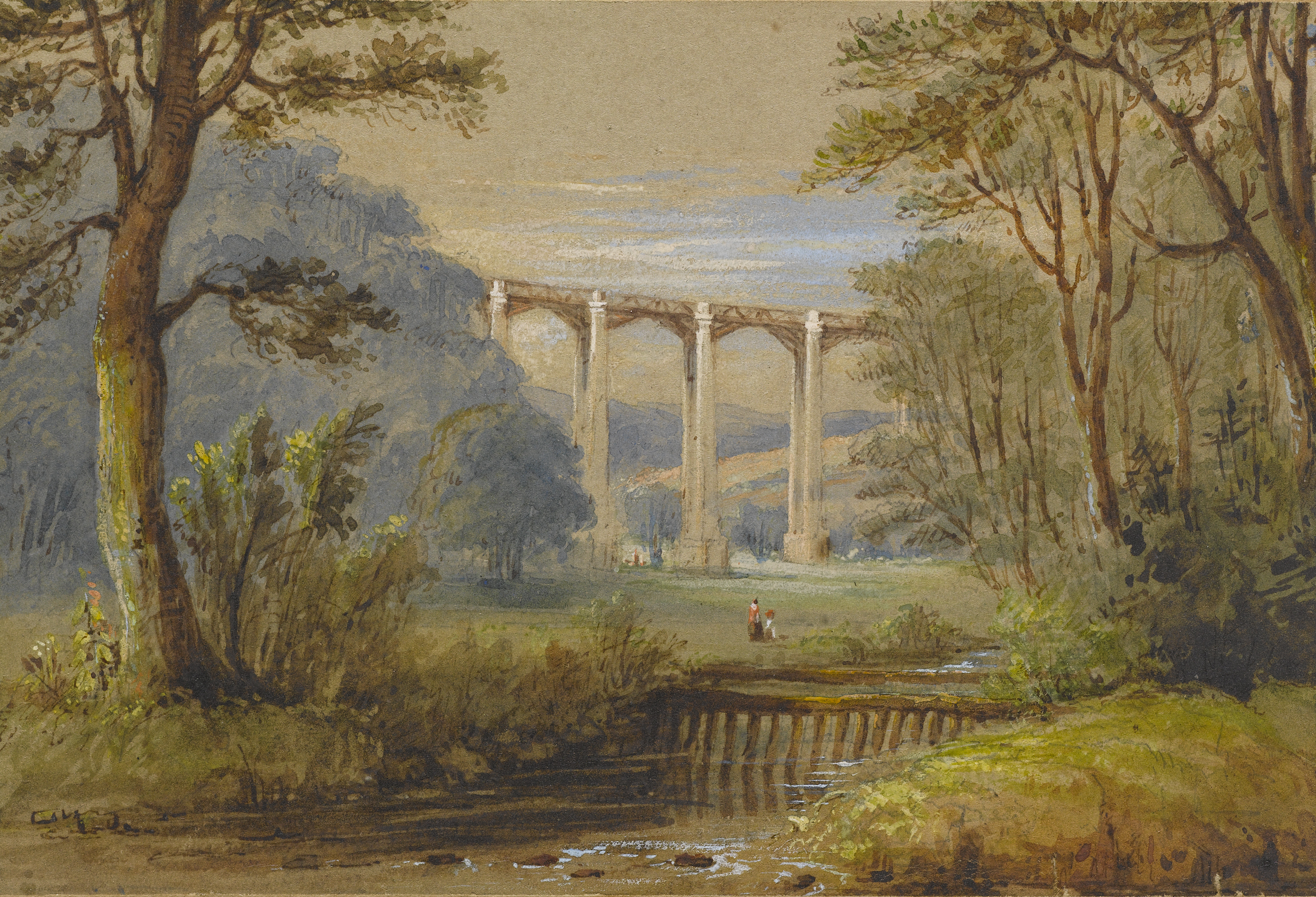
Viaduct near Slade, Plymouth, painting by Nicholas Matthew Condy

Many viaducts over land connect points of similar height in a landscape, usually by bridging a river valley or other eroded opening in an otherwise flat area. Often such valleys had roads descending either side (with a small bridge over the river, where necessary) that become inadequate for the traffic load, necessitating a viaduct for "through" traffic. Such bridges also lend themselves for use by rail traffic, which requires straighter and flatter routes. Some viaducts have more than one deck, such that one deck has vehicular traffic and another deck carries rail traffic. One example of this is the Prince Edward Viaduct in Toronto, Canada, that carries motor traffic on the top deck as Bloor Street, and metro as the Bloor-Danforth subway line on the lower deck, over the steep Don River valley. Others were built to span settled areas, crossing over roads beneath—the reason for many viaducts in London.

== Over water ==
The Millau Viaduct

Viaducts over water make use of islands or successive arches. They are often combined with other types of bridges or tunnels to cross navigable waters as viaduct sections, while less expensive to design and build than tunnels or bridges with larger spans, typically lack sufficient horizontal and vertical clearance for large ships. See the Chesapeake Bay Bridge-Tunnel.

The Millau Viaduct is a cable-stayed road-bridge that spans the valley of the river Tarn near Millau in southern France. It opened in 2004 and is the tallest vehicular bridge in the world, with one pier's summit at 343 metres (1,125 ft). The viaduct Danyang–Kunshan Grand Bridge in China was the longest bridge in the world as of 2011.

== Land use below viaducts ==
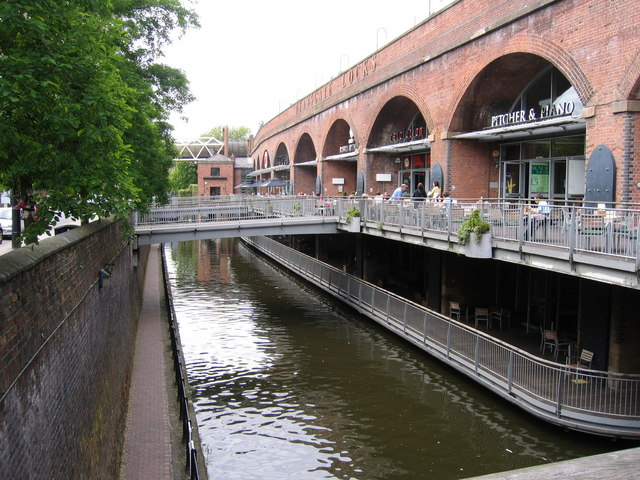
"Deansgate Locks" bars under a light rail station in Manchester, England

Where a viaduct is built across land rather than water, the space below the arches may be used for businesses such as car parking, vehicle repairs, light industry, bars and nightclubs. In the United Kingdom, many railway lines in urban areas have been constructed on viaducts, and so the infrastructure owner Network Rail has an extensive property portfolio in arches under viaducts. In Berlin the space under the arches of elevated subway lines (S-Bahn) is used for several different purposes, including small eateries or bars.

== Past and future ==
Elevated expressways were built in major cities such as Boston (Central Artery), Los Angeles, San Francisco, Seoul, Tokyo and Toronto (Gardiner Expressway). Some were demolished because they were unappealing and divided the city. In other cases, viaducts were demolished because they were structurally unsafe, such as the Embarcadero Freeway in San Francisco, which was damaged by an earthquake in 1989. However, in developing nations such as Thailand (Bang Na Expressway, the world's longest road bridge), India (Delhi-Gurgaon Expressway), China, Bangladesh, Pakistan, and Nicaragua, elevated expressways have been built and more are under construction to improve traffic flow, particularly as a workaround of land shortage when built atop surface roads.

Other uses have been found for some viaducts. In Paris, France, a repurposed rail viaduct provides a garden promenade on top and workspace for artisans below. The garden promenade is called the Coulée verte René-Dumont while the workspaces in the arches below are the Viaduc des Arts. The project was inaugurated in 1993. Manhattan's High Line, inaugurated in 2009, also uses an elevated train line as a linear urban park.

In Indonesia viaducts are used for railways in Java and also for highways such as the Jakarta Inner Ring Road. In January 2019, the Alaskan Way Viaduct in Seattle was closed and replaced with a tunnel after several decades of use because it was seismically unsafe.

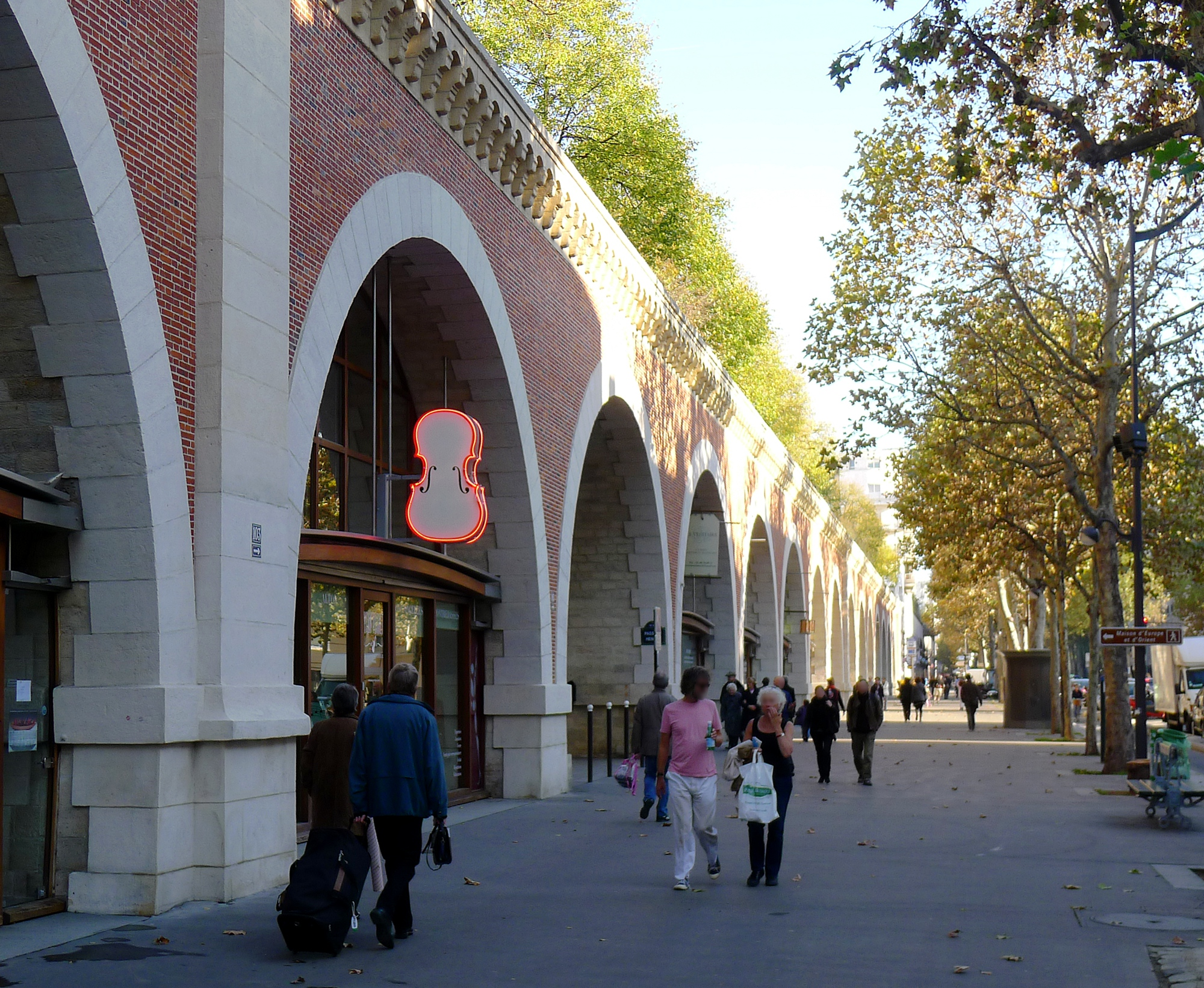
The Viaduc des Arts, Paris, France

== See also ==
- List of bridge types
- Arch bridge
- Causeway
- Flying junction
- List of bridges
  - Crueize Viaduct
  - Glenfinnan Viaduct
  - Ribblehead Viaduct
