= Quartier de Picpus =

Coordinates: 48.83988571166992°N 2.3955886363983154°E

Picpus
- Quartier de Picpus
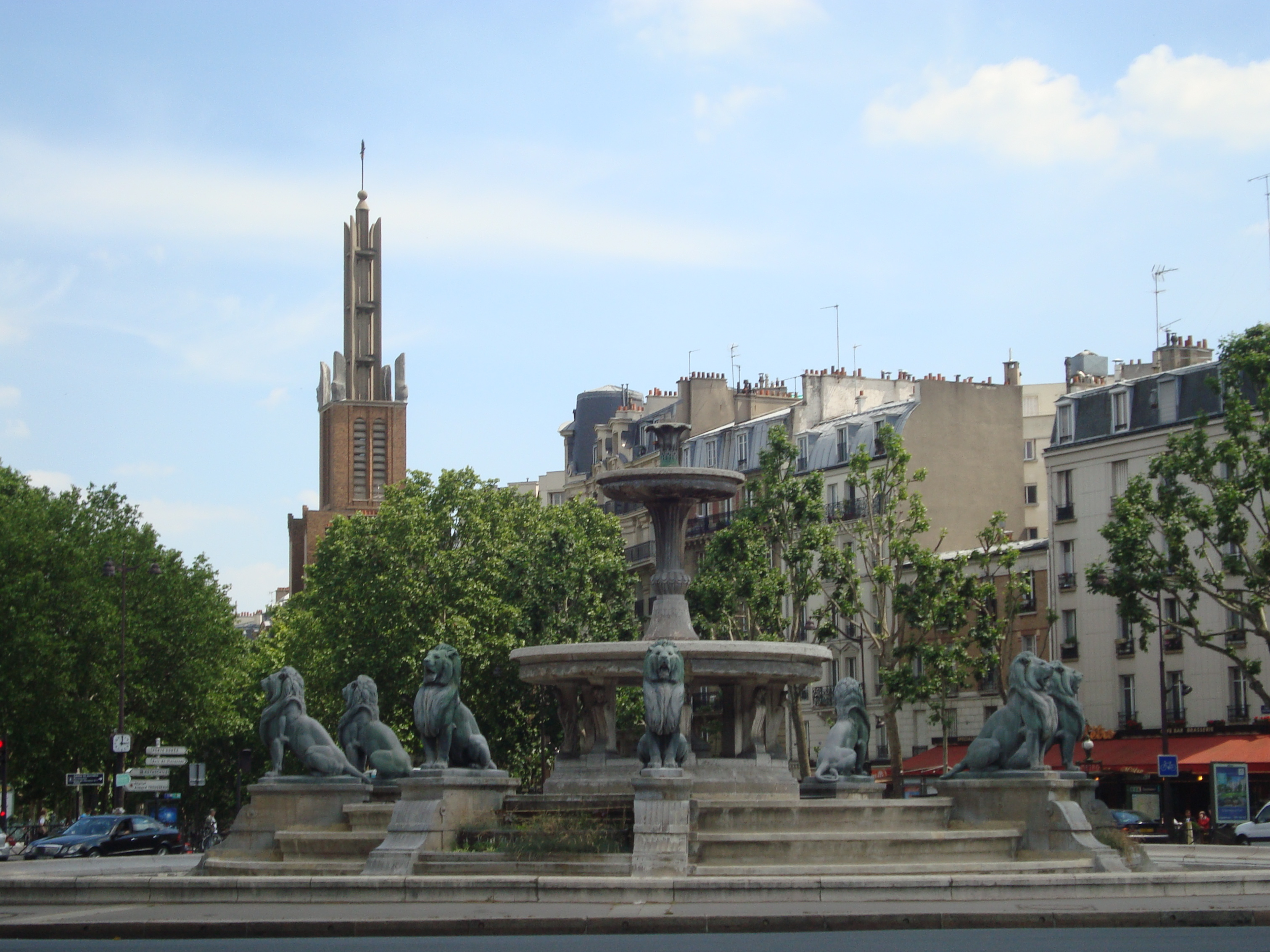
- Place Félix-Éboué
- Interactive map of Picpus
- Country: France
- Region: Île-de-France
- Ville: Paris
- Arrondissement: 12th

Area
  - Total: 1.863 km^{2} (0.719 sq mi)

Population (2016)
  - Total: 64,753
  - Density: 34,757/km^{2} (90,020/sq mi)

The Quartier de Picpus is the 46th of the 80 quarters of Paris located in the 12th arrondissement.

== Location ==
the Quarters of the 12th arrondissement

The Quartier de Picpus is bordered to the south by the Quartier de Bercy, to the north by the Quartier de Charonne, to the west by the Quartier des Quinze-Vingts, and to the east by the Quartier du Bel-Air.

== Origin of the name ==
Its name is derived from the main street of the same name (Rue de Picpus), which originated as a path in the 14th century and passed through the locality of Pique-Puce.

== History ==
=== Hameau de Picpus ===
The origins of the district can be traced back to a locality known as "Pique-Puce" (literally "flea-bite"), which covered roughly the same area as the present-day neighborhood. The stories surrounding the origin of this name are quite fantastical: one account tells of a miraculous recovery from a flea-borne illness, brought about by the treatment of a monk; another theory suggests the name may have been inspired by the flea-colored (brownish-speckled) habits worn by the monks. An 18th-century scholarly treatise by Pierre Gosse Junior and Daniel Pinet proposes an etymology rooted in the Celtic language: "pac," "pec," or "pic" signifies a mountain or hilltop, while "puce" is derived from "pud" or "pod"—Celtic terms for a riverbank or shore.

In the past, several religious communities established themselves in the vicinity of what is now the Rue de Picpus, including an institution for Augustinian canonesses known as Notre-Dame-de-la-Victoire-de-Lépante. When the revolutionary sections of Paris were created, the area was incorporated into the Section des Quinze-Vingts. In 1795, the territory was then assigned to what was formerly the 8th arrondissement.

=== Quartier de Picpus ===
The section of the Rue de Picpus between the Boulevard de Reuilly and the present-day Avenue Daumesnil (formerly the Chemin de la Croix-Rouge) served as the boundary between the communes of Saint-Mandé (now the Quartier du Bel-Air) and Bercy. Following the construction of the Thiers wall—a defensive fortification—in 1844, this area fell within the wall's perimeter, thereby becoming subject to the provisions of the law of June 16, 1859, regarding the annexation of territory to Paris.

On November 3, 1859, the administrative district of Picpus was defined as follows:

- a portion of the former 8th arrondissement (Section des Quinze-Vingts), situated to the north and west of the former boulevard that ran along the Wall of the Fermiers généraux;
- a portion of the former commune of Bercy, located south of the Boulevard de Reuilly and west of the Rue de Picpus and the present-day Avenue Daumesnil.

In April 1929, Paris incorporated a section of the zone non aedificandi (a restricted building zone) and part of the Bois de Vincennes. A portion of the territory of Charenton-le-Pont was annexed to the Quartier de Picpus. The Bois de Vincennes was divided, with its territory now falling within the Quartier de Picpus and the Quartier du Bel-Air.

== Sightseeing features ==
- Sorbonne Nouvelle University, Nation campus
- Picpus Convent and Cemetery; a private cemetery containing the tomb of La Fayette
- Place de la Nation
- Bercy Cemetery, Charenton Cemetery (located in the Bois de Vincennes)
- Jardin de Reuilly-Paul-Pernin
