= Quartier du Bel-Air =

Coordinates: 48.8479765°N 2.3984296°E

Bel-Air
- Quartier du Bel-Air
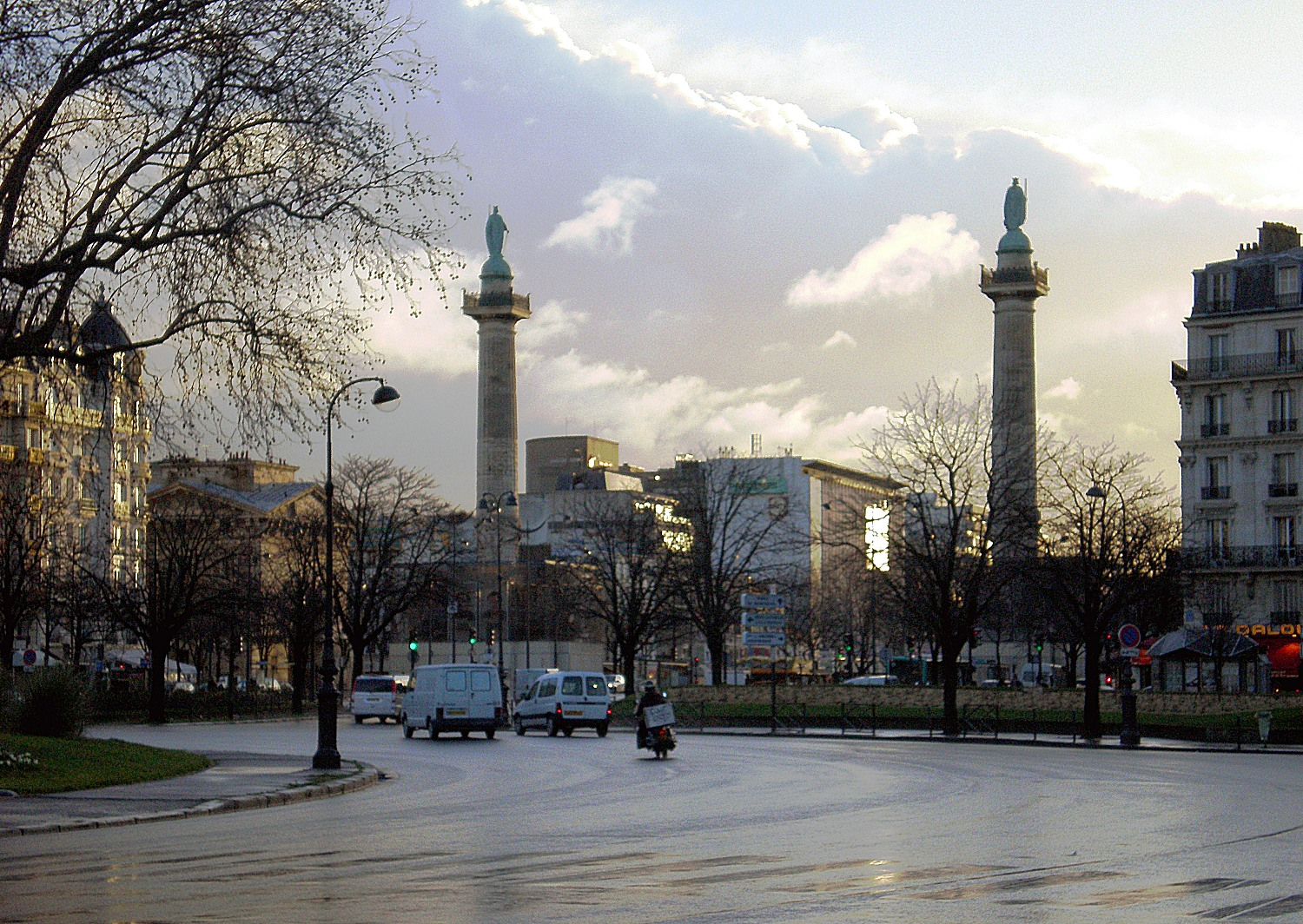
- The Barrière du Trône and the Cours de Vincennes.
- Country: France
- Region: Île-de-France
- Ville: Paris
- Arrondissement: 12th

Area
  - Total: 1.386 km^{2} (0.535 sq mi)

Population (2016)
  - Total: 36,299
  - Density: 26,190/km^{2} (67,800/sq mi)

The Quartier du Bel-Air is the 45th quarter of Paris, located in the 12th arrondissement. In 2016, its population was 36,299 inhabitants.

The Quarters of the 12th arrondissement

== Geography ==
The Bel-Air neighborhood is located in the eastern part of the 12th arrondissement. Its boundaries are as follows:

- to the north, the Cours de Vincennes, which separates it from the 20th arrondissement;
- to the west, the Boulevard de Picpus and the Rue de Picpus, which separate it from the Quartier de Picpus;
- to the south, the Bois de Vincennes;
- to the east, the commune of Saint-Mandé.

From an administrative perspective, the Bois de Vincennes is divided between the Bel-Air neighborhood (to the north) and the Picpus neighborhood (to the south). Excluding the Bois de Vincennes, it covers an area of 138.8 hectares.

== History ==
The section of the present-day Rue de Picpus located between Boulevard de Reuilly and the current Avenue Daumesnil (formerly the Chemin de la Croix-Rouge)—along with the current Avenue Daumesnil itself (laid out along the path of the former Chemin des Marais, also known as the Chemin des Passes-Putains)—marked the boundary between the communes of Saint-Mandé to the north and Bercy to the south (the Picpus district). When the fortifications of Paris were constructed in 1844, this territory fell within the city walls, and it was subsequently annexed to Paris by the law of June 16, 1859.

The administrative district of Bel-Air was established on November 3, 1859, comprising:

- the portion of Saint-Mandé that was annexed to Paris (excluding the area between the Cours de Vincennes and the Rue de Lagny, which was attached to the Quartier de Charonne);
- a small part of the former commune of Bercy, located south of the present-day Avenue Daumesnil.

In April 1929, Paris absorbed a portion of the "Zone" (the area surrounding the city fortifications) as well as the Bois de Vincennes. The territories taken from the commune of Saint-Mandé were incorporated into the Bel-Air district, while the Bois de Vincennes was divided between the Picpus and Bel-Air districts.

== Notable buildings and sites of memory ==
- The Palais de la Porte Dorée, located at Porte Dorée, formerly housed the National Museum of African and Oceanic Arts and has, since 2007, been home to the National Museum of the History of Immigration (Cité nationale de l'histoire de l'immigration).
- The Centre International de Séjour de Paris (Paris International Stay Center)—specifically the Maurice Ravel site—provides accommodation and dining for tourists, operating along the lines of a youth hostel.
- The Bel-Air neighborhood is traversed by the eastern section of the Coulée verte René-Dumont.
