= Le Tallec's patterns =

Camille Le Tallec has preserved and created in its studio more than 375 Limoges porcelain decorative patterns signed by the Le Tallec's marks. There were realized in the French technical tradition of the 18th and 19th centuries, developed for the Sèvres porcelain. From 1961, some of the Le Tallec's patterns were especially created for Tiffany & Co and by 1990 when the studio was acquired by the jewelry and silverware company an extensive new creation process had then been engaged.

The list of the 100 most popular patterns amongst others:

- Abeilles Or (Golden bees)
- Alice
- Angoulême
- Attributs de Musique (Music attributes)
- Automne boisé (Wooded Fall)
- Bacchus
- Bagatelle
- Bande Corail sur Bleuets (Coral Stripes on Cornflower)
- Baron Jourdan
- Bayeux
- Bigouden
- Black Shoulder
- Bleu Celeste (Heavenly blue)
- Bourgogne (Burgundy)
- Carousel Chinois (Chinese Carousel)
- Cartes (Playing cards)
- Chantilly
- Charmille
- Chinoiseries sur Or (Chinoiseries on Gold)
- Cirque Chinois (Chinese circus)
- Clairette
- Clowns
- Cœurs Fleuris (Flowered Hearts)
- Corail Chinois (Chinese coral)
- Coral with Medallion Flower
- Croisillon et Fleurs (Braces and Flowers)
- Crépuscule des Dieux (Dawnfall of the Gods)
- Dentelle (Lace)
- Dentelle Fleurie (Flowered Lace)
- Directoire
- Escalier de Cristal (Crystal Stairs)
- Famille Rose (Rose's family)
- Feathers
- Feuilles de Chêne (Oak's Leaves)
- Fleur de Lys
- Fleurs sur Fond Gris (Fleur de Lys on grey background)
- Fleurs sur Fond Noir (Fleur de Lys on black background)
- Grignan
- Grisé à la Manière de Boucher
- Guerre et Paix et Batailles de Napoléon (War and Peace and Napoleon's Battles)
- Guirlande de Fleurs (Garland)
- Halcyon
- Harvest
- Incrustés Or (Golden Inlays)
- Imari
- Jardin (Garden)
- Jardin de Chine (Gardens of China)
- Joséphine
- Kimono
- Laque de Chine (Lacquers of China)
- Losanges en Or (Golden Diamonds)
- Lubéron
- Lulu
- Madame du Barry
- Marie Antoinette
- Marin en Relief d'Or sur Blanc (Marin in gold relief on White)
- Marin sur Jaune (Marin on Yellow)
- Marseille
- Mauresque
- Médaillon de Fleurs
- Médaillon de Sèvres
- Mennecy
- Myosotis Bleu (Blue Forget-me-not)
- Napoléon III
- Nuits de Chine (Nights of China)
- Ondine
- Oiseaux (Birds)
- Oiseaux de Paradis (Birds-of-paradise)
- Oiseaux de Sèvres sur Or (Birds on golden Sèvres)
- Or et Platine (Gold and Platinum)
- Palmier d'Or (Golden Palm-trees)
- Panache
- Pastorale
- Petits Metiers de Paris (Paris' art craft)
- Plumes (Feathers)
- Poisson de Chine (Chinese fish)
- Polka
- Princesse Astride
- Rochas
- Ronde de Cygnes (Round dance of Swans)
- Ronsard
- Ruban Rose (Rose Ribbon)
- Rue de la Paix
- Siam
- Soleil (Sun)
- Taj Mahal
- Treille Muscate (Vine Arbour)
- Tulipes sur Or (Tulips on Gold)
- Tulipes Royales (Royal Tulips)
- Valse (Waltz)
- Viaduc des Arts (Viaduct of Arts)
- Vignes Rouges (Red Vines)
- William IV

In addition, Camille Le Tallec has also interacted with modern artists, which occurred to be friends, especially after the WWII to create original and limited series of patterns. Among them may be cited :

- Danseurs espagnols designed in 1949 by Jean Toth, for the Opéra Garnier.
- Danses africaines designed in 1950 by Jean Toth for Marin's connoisseur shop in Paris.
- Ballet, designed in 1949 by Jean Target for the Opéra Garnier depicting dancers Paulette Dynalix, Tamara Toumanova and Yvette Chauviré.
- Ladies designed in 1945 by Louis Touchagues.
- Poissons designed in 1945 by Louis Touchagues.
- Combats de Coqs designed by Lucien Louvegnies.

== Bibliography ==
- Keith and Thomas Waterbrook-Clyde, Atelier Le Tallec Hand Painting Limoges Porcelain, Schiffer Publishing, 2003 (ISBN 0-7643-1708-3)
