= Le Tallec's marks =

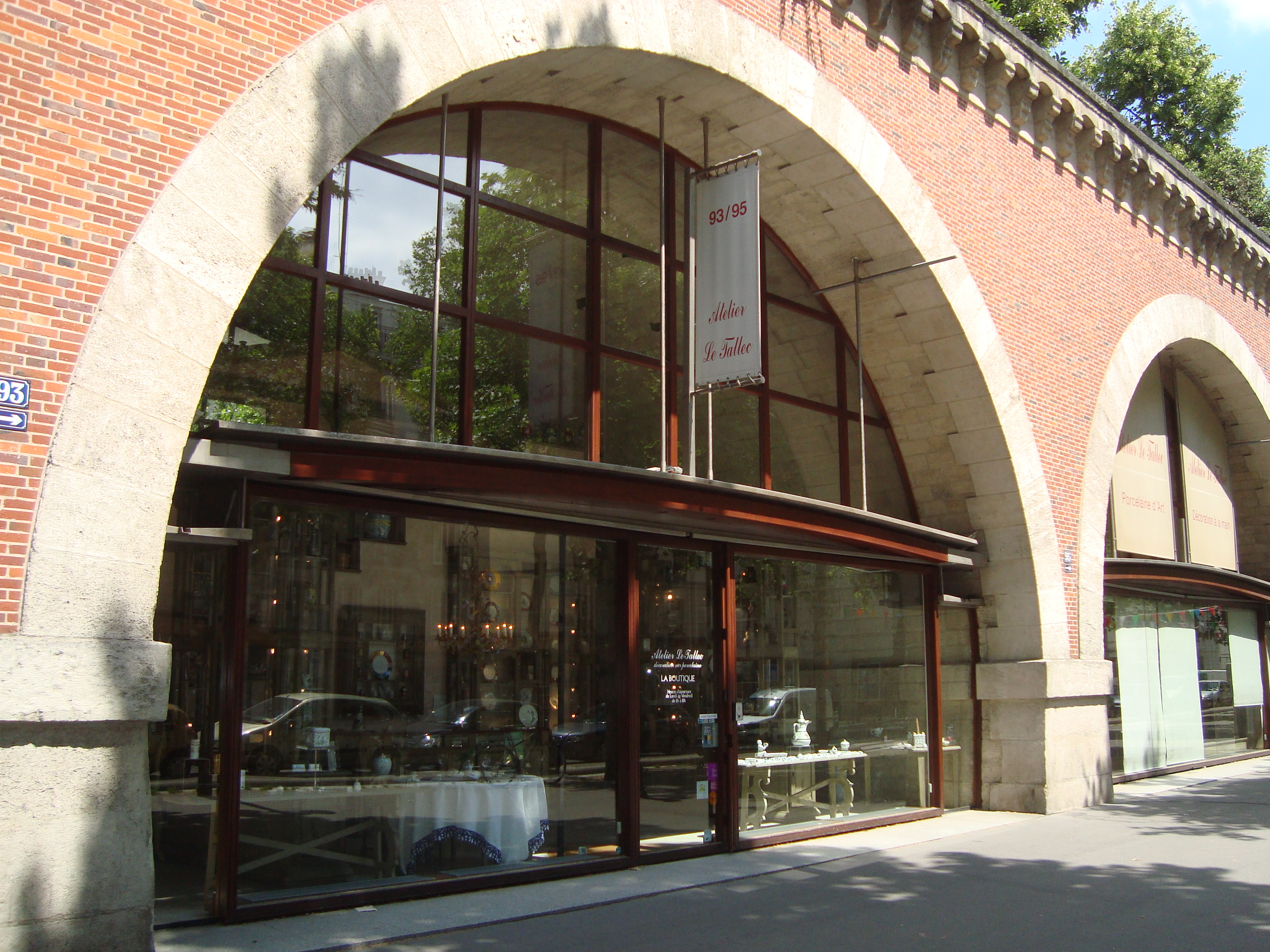
The studio Le Tallec at the viaduc des arts on avenue Daumesnil in Paris.

Each porcelain decorated by the Atelier Camille Le Tallec in Paris is signed by an LT motif in a Sèvres-like mark. Inside the LT motif appear two series of letters. First, a letter code in the upper part indicating the date of production of the piece, and second the initials of the piece's painter in the lower part. This dating system has been adopted from 1941. Le Tallec's pieces without these marks are likely to be produced between 1930 and 1941. Incrementation of the dating system was done every six-month period from 1941 to 1991, then every year since. By 1978, date of the transfer of the atelier from Belleville to rue de Reuilly in Paris, the date mark starts by R (for Reuilly), then the letter. By 1995, corresponding to the new installation at the avenue Daumesnil in Paris, the date mark starts by D (for Daumesnil) then the letter.

The sentences dessiné et peint entièrement peint à la main par Le Tallec à Paris France or Tiffany & Co - Private Stock and Le Tallec Paris - Made in France are also drawn.

== Dating system table ==
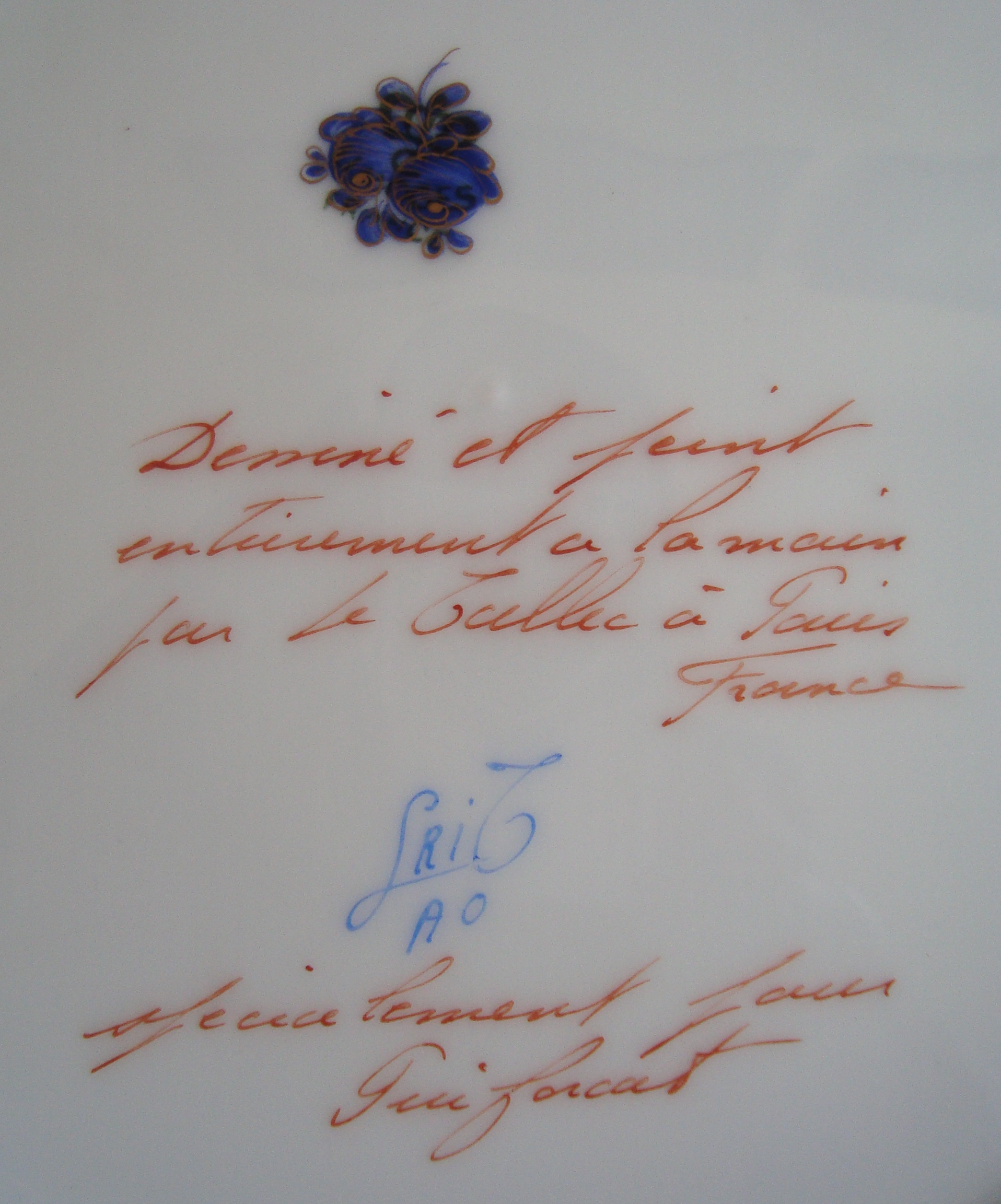
Le Tallec's marks on a hand painted plate in 1982 (RI)

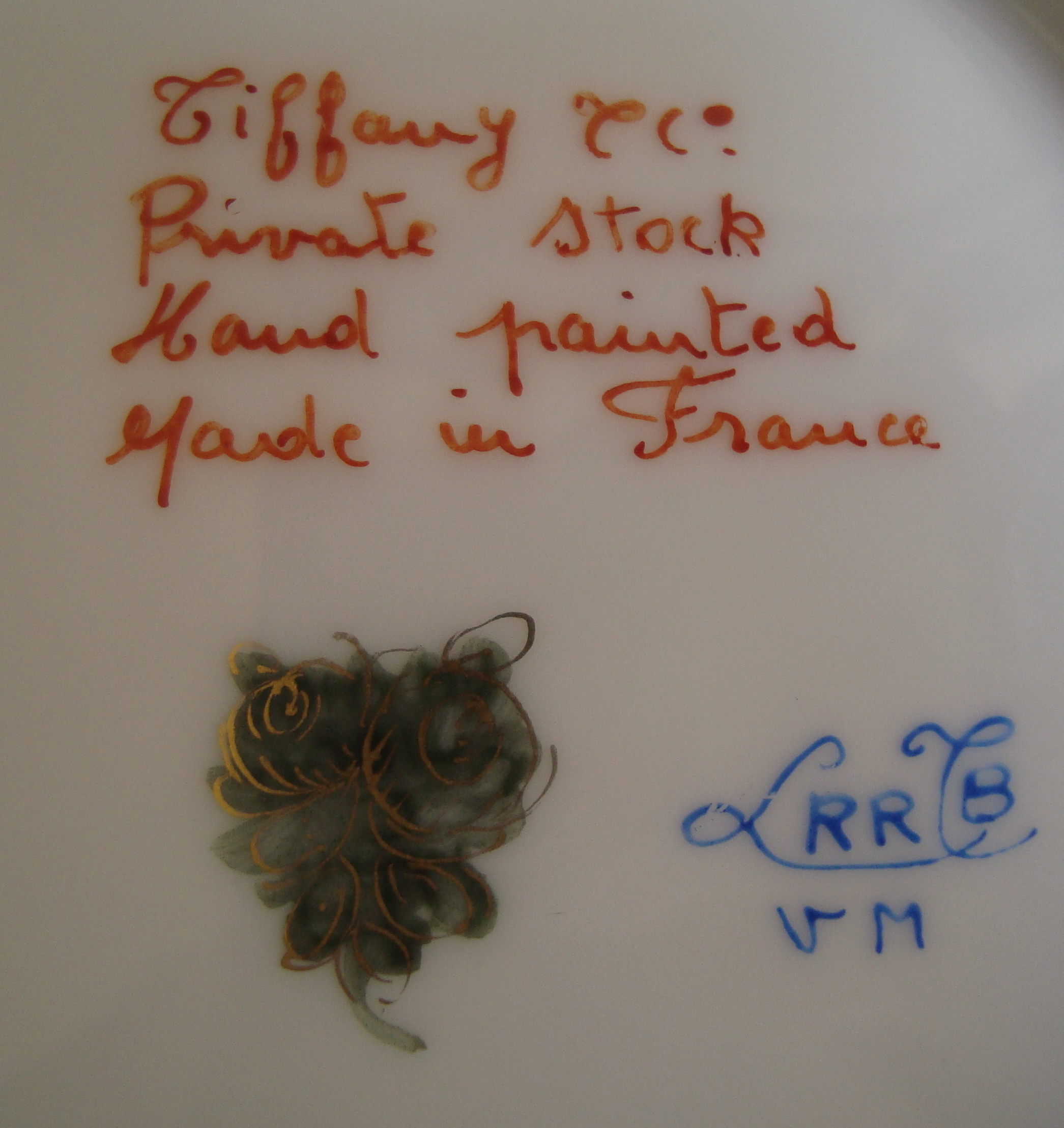
Le Tallec's marks on a hand painted pattern designed for Tiffany & Co. in 1992 (RRB).

A	B	C	D	E	F	G	H	I	J	K	L	M
1941	1941	1942	1942	1943	1943	1944	1944	1945	1945	1946	1946	1947
N	O	P	Q	R	S	T	U	V	W	X	Y	Z
1947	1948	1948	1949	1949	1950	1950	1951	1951	1952	1952	1953	1953
AA	BB	CC	DD	EE	FF	GG	HH	II	JJ	KK	LL	MM
1954	1954	1955	1955	1956	1956	1957	1957	1958	1958	1959	1959	1960
NN	OO	PP	QQ	RR	SS	TT	UU	VV	WW	XX	YY	ZZ
1960	1961	1961	1962	1962	1963	1963	1964	1964	1965	1965	1966	1966
α	β	γ	δ	ε	ζ	η	θ	ι	ϰ	λ	μ	ν
1967	1967	1968	1968	1969	1969	1970	1970	1971	1971	1972	1972	1973
ξ	π	ρ	S6	τ	υ	φ	χ	ψ	ω	RA	RB	RC
1973	1974	1974	1975	1975	1976	1976	1977	1977	1978	1978	1979	1979
RD	RE	RF	RG	RH	RI	RJ	RK	RL	RM	RN	RO	RP
1980	1980	1981	1981	1982	1982	1983	1983	1984	1984	1985	1985	1986
RQ	RR	RS	RT	RU	RV	RW	RX	RY	RZ	RRA	RRB	RRC
1986	1987	1987	1988	1988	1989	1989	1990	1990	1991	1991	1992	1993
RRD	RRE	DA	DB	DC	DD	DE	DF	DG	DH	DI	DJ	DK
1994	1995	1995	1996	1997	1998	1999	2000	2001	2002	2003	2004	2005
DL	DM	DN	DO	DP	DQ	DR	DS	DT	DU	DV	DW	DX
2006	2007	2008	2009	2010	2011	2012	2013	2014	2015	2016	2017	2018

== Painter's initials ==
List of the asserted painters of the Atelier Le Tallec:

AC, AD, AG, AK, AKG, AL, ALT, AM, CB, CC, CCT, CG, CGM, CH, CJ, CL, CLC, CLS, CM, CS, CV, DD, DL, ED, FE, FF, FG, FM, FN, FV, G, GC, GD, GH, GK, GL, GM, GP, HCR, HLR, HM, JD, JJ, JL, JLC, JN, LB, LC, LH, MC, MCD, MF, MFM, MJ, ML, MM, MMF, MP, MYB, MYR, NB, OO, PP, RB, RG, RJ, SD, SF, SFM, SG, SH, SHF, SM, SP, TP, VD, VM, YM, YP

== Bibliography ==
- Keith and Thomas Waterbrook-Clyde, Atelier Le Tallec Hand Painting Limoges Porcelain, Schiffer Publishing, 2003 (ISBN 0-7643-1708-3)
