= Camille Le Tallec =

French porcelain craftsman and artist

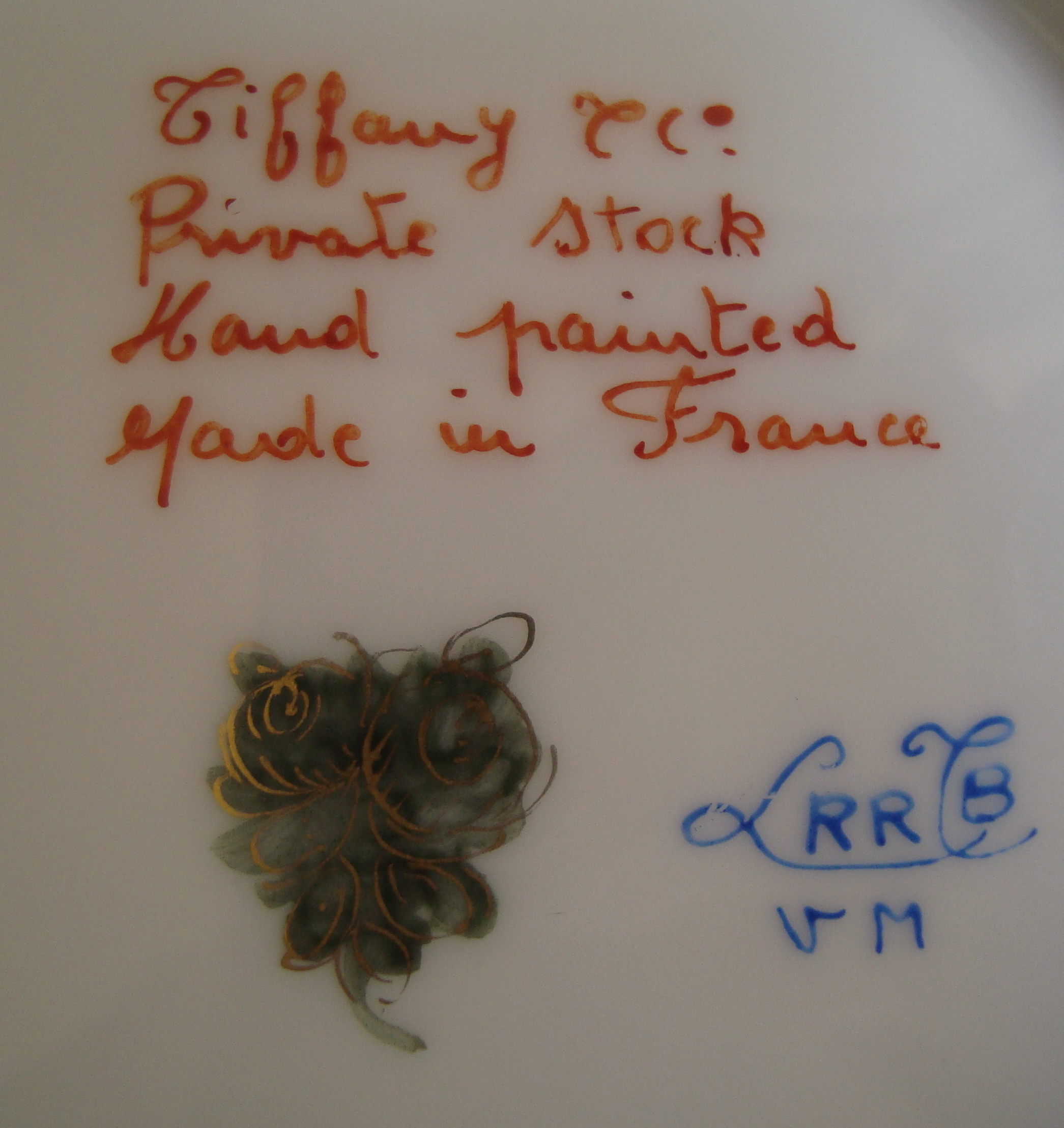
Marks on a 1962 piece by Le Tallec for Tiffany & Co

Camille Le Tallec (November 9, 1906 – August 21, 1991) was a French porcelain craftsman and artist.

== Biography ==
Camille Le Tallec was born in Paris from Breton of Lorient and Picard ancestry. He graduated in 1929 from the École du Louvre in Paris with a thesis on the Nast porcelain of the 18th century. He then took over, in 1930, the familial hand-painted porcelain studio founded in Belleville (Paris) early in the century.

Rapidly, Le Tallec decided to continue in the tradition of the Vincennes porcelain and Sèvres porcelain, expanding the small and local business, the Atelier Le Tallec. In thirty years, the studio created hand-painted porcelain tablewares for famous individuals such as Queen Elizabeth II of the United Kingdom, Kings Mohammed V and Hassan II of Morocco, the Ville de Paris or the French Republic, amongst others.

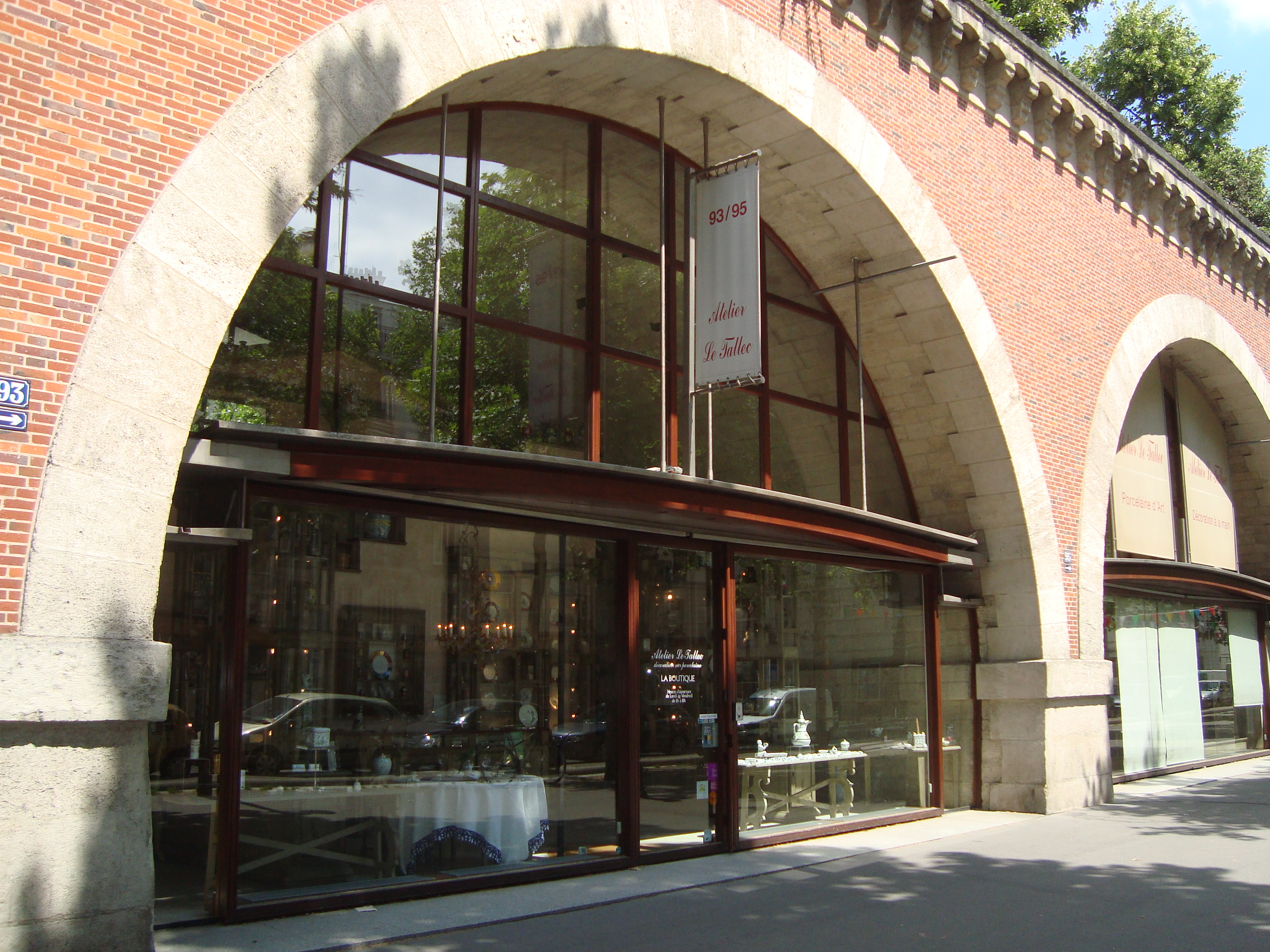
Atelier Le Tallec in the Viaduc des Arts

In 1961, Le Tallec started a fruitful collaboration with the silver and jewelry firm Tiffany & Co which led in 1990 to the Atelier Le Tallec's incorporation into the American company, one year before his death in Paris. Tiffany's and Le Tallec designed successful original and private porcelain patterns that can be seen both at the Viaduc des Arts of the promenade plantée in the 12th arrondissement of Paris and in all Tiffany's stores in the United States.

Over 60 years, Le Tallec has maintained traditional hand-painted porcelain. He preserved and revisited about 375 original and historical patterns signed by the Le Tallec's marks. Atelier Le Tallec was inducted as a member of the Grands Ateliers de France (the fifty best studios in France) in 2000.

In 2014, the studio Le Tallec is definitely closed upon Tiffany's decision not to pursue the activity or sell the company, ending ninety consecutive years of china craftsmanship.

Le Tallec also acquired from 1935 to 1955 prestigious pieces of European porcelain. His exceptional collection was dispersed by auction in 1990, and some masterpieces acquired by international museums such as the Louvre, the musée de la Faïence de Marseille, and the musée de l'Île-de-France and various porcelain collectors.

He was a Chevalier de la Légion d'honneur appointed in 1976 by a schoolmate of his: Edgar Faure, then president of the French National Assembly.

== Bibliography ==
- Atelier Le Tallec Hand Painting Limoges Porcelain, Keith Waterbrook-Clyde and Thomas Waterbrook-Clyde, Schiffer Publishing, 2003 ISBN 0-7643-1708-3.
- Hand Painted Porcelain Plates: Nineteenth Century to the Present, par Richard Rendall, Schiffer Publishing, 2003, ISBN 978-0-7643-1692-0.

== Sources ==
- (in French) This article is partially or entirely translated from the article Camille Le Tallec on the French Wikipedia.
