= Viaduc des Arts =

Repurposed elevated rail line in Paris

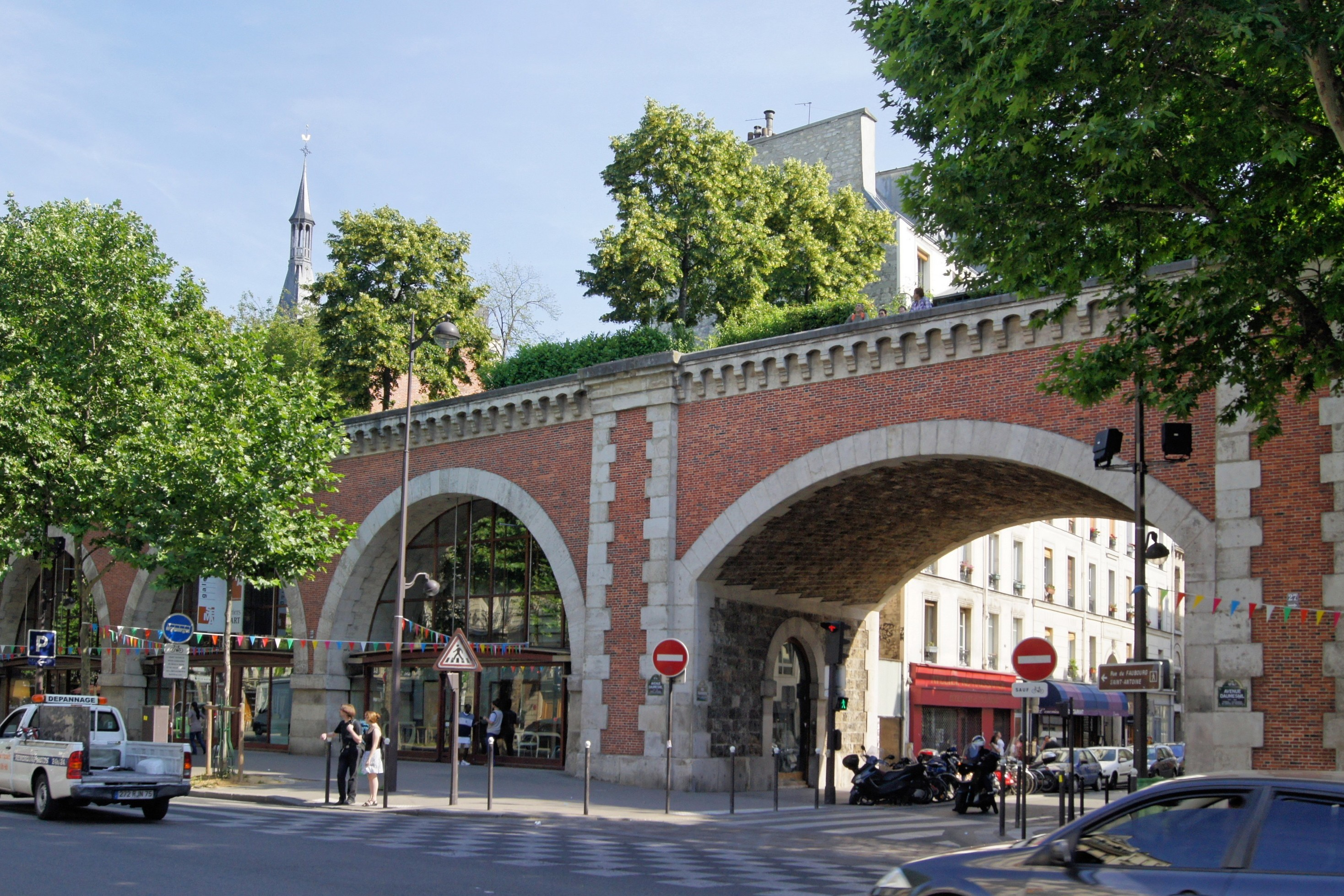

- Location within France

General information
- Type: Infrastructure rehabilitation
- Location: Paris 12th Arrondissement, 1–129 Avenue Daumesnil, France
- Coordinates: 48.8467°N 2.3769°E
- Construction started: 1990
- Opened: 1994

Design and construction
- Architect: Patrick Berger

The Viaduc des Arts is a converted train line located in the 12th arrondissement of Paris which is now both a series of workshops for highly skilled artisans and, on the top level, the Promenade Plantée, a linear park. It was formerly the "Viaduc de Bastille," for the trains of the Paris-Bastille-Vincennes line.

This repurposing project was designed by the architect Patrick Berger under the direction of the SEMAEST, a private-public consortium for infrastructure development.

The vaults of the Viaduc now host the workshops of artisans working in such diverse areas as glass blowing, furniture manufacturing and jewellery making. Thus, the Viaduc preserves the 12th arrondissement’s tradition of skilled craftsmanship.

== History ==
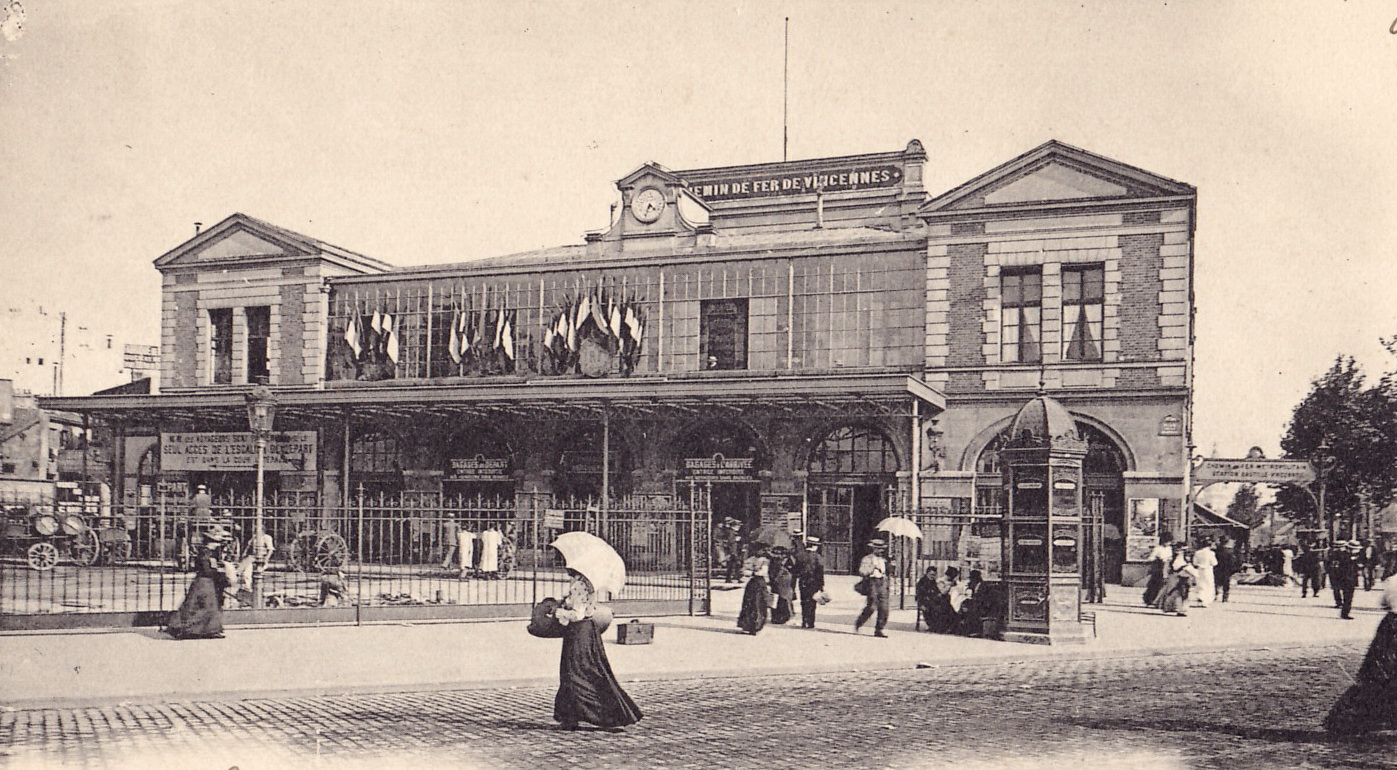
The Vincennes railway station at Place de la Bastille

In 1853, the private company "Société de Chemin de Fer Paris Strasbourg" was authorised to build a train line crossing Paris 12th arrondissement from Bastille to Verneuil l'Etang, passing through Vincennes. The project required massive construction work, including tunnels and crossings.

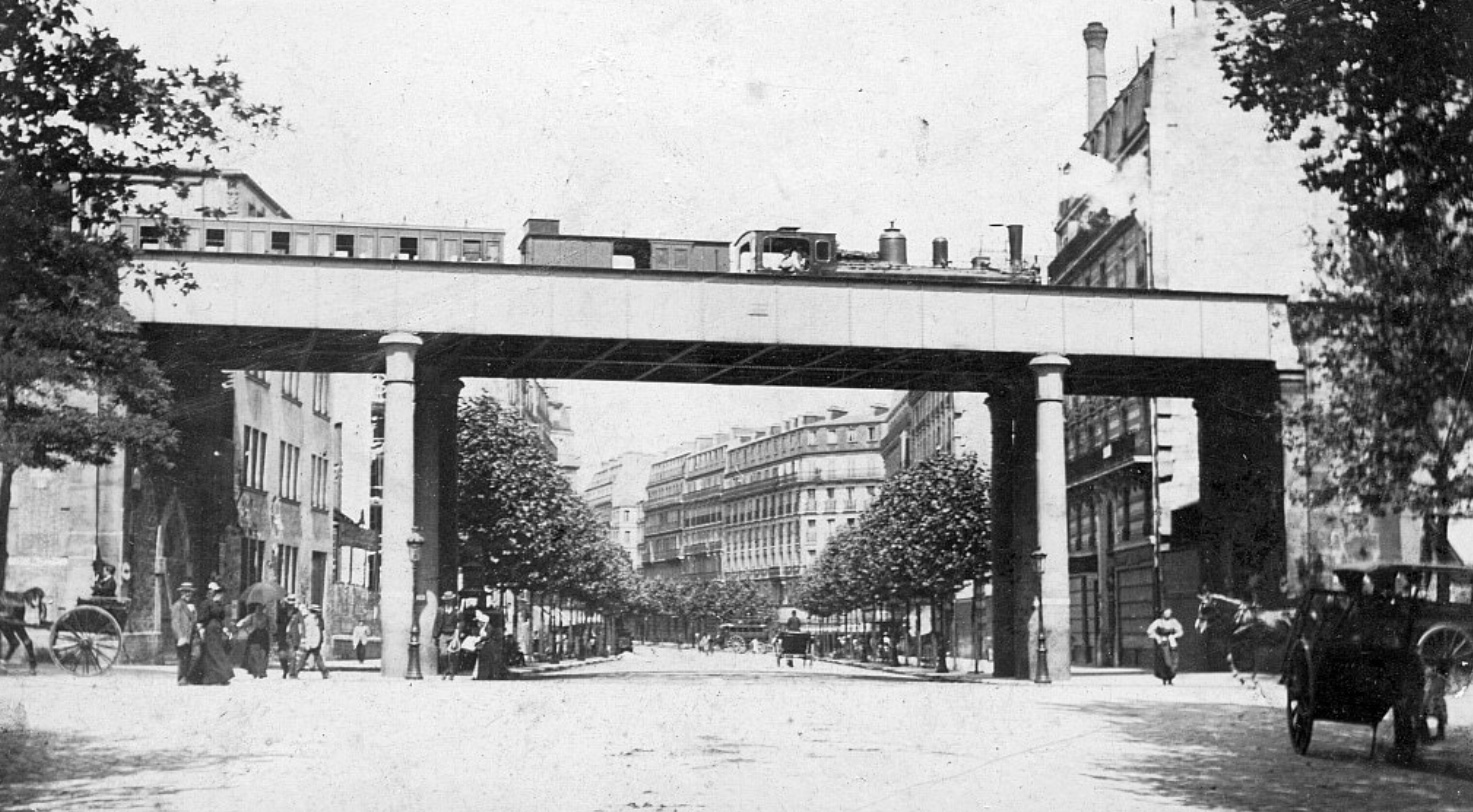
A train on the Viaduc, at the level of avenue Ledru Rollin, in the late 19th century.

The "Viaduc de la Bastille" — a 1.5-kilometre (0.93 mi) long viaduct consisting of 64 vaults — was a major part of the overall project. The brick and stone construction is about 10 meters high.

The train line was opened in 1859. It ceased to operate in 1969 after the creation of the RER A regional transport line, into which a part of the original line was integrated. The Paris-Vincennes stretch was completely abandoned (except for the merchandise train station at Reuilly).

In 1979, the APUR (Atelier Parisien d'Urbanisme) was commissioned to rethink the use of the viaduct that follows the Rue de Lyon and the Avenue Daumesnil Along with the choice of replacing the Bastille station with a new Opera house (Opera Bastille), the decision was taken to re-purpose the railroad line itself into a public park, and to make use of the space under the viaduct's vaults as places for artisans to work and display their wares. Indeed, the viaduc offered an attractive façade onto the Avenue Daumesnil and its vaults provided useful and unusual spaces is their own right.

In 1983, the plan for the public park – the "Promenade Plantée" – linking Place de la Bastille to Bois de Vincennes was one of the most important projects for the revitalization of the eastern neighbourhoods of Paris. The project was designed by the landscape architect Jacques Vergely and the architect Philippe Mathieux.

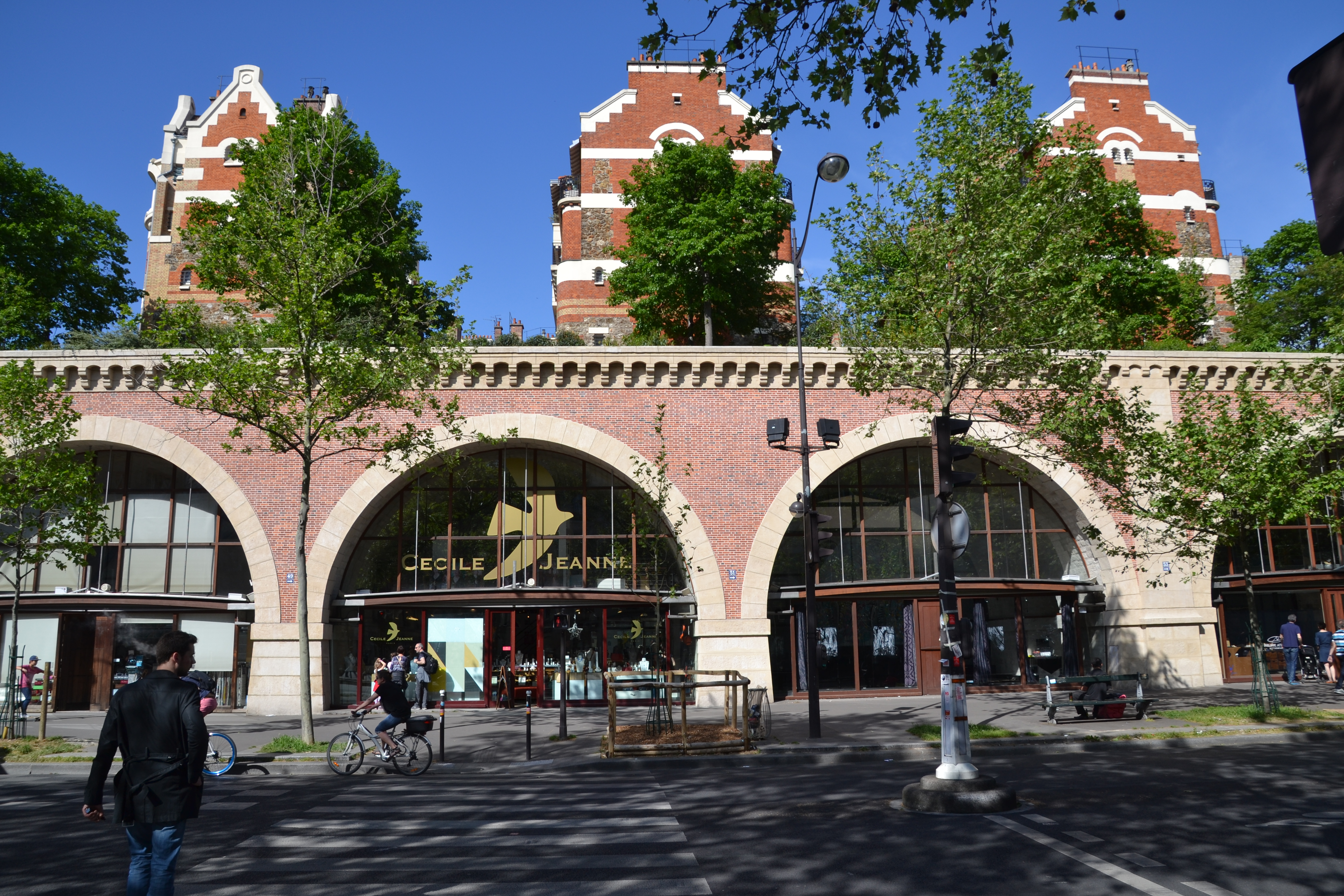
Front view of the Viaduc

In 1988, the design of the architect Patrick Berger was chosen for the reconversion of the arcades into a strip of workshops, and the first part of the promenade plantée (from rue Picpus to rue Michel Bizot) was opened one year later. The occupation of the vaults by artisans began in 1994 and was completed in 1997.

The design of the re-purposing project consisted mainly of cleaning the viaduct and closing the vaults with glass walls on their two sides. The central parts of the arches were cleared out in order to add relief in the façade and to allow the shadow of each arch to highlight its curved shape. These changes allowed the 64 vaults (whose sizes vary between 150 and 460 m^{2}) to be converted into a strip of workshops and cafés.

== Gallery ==
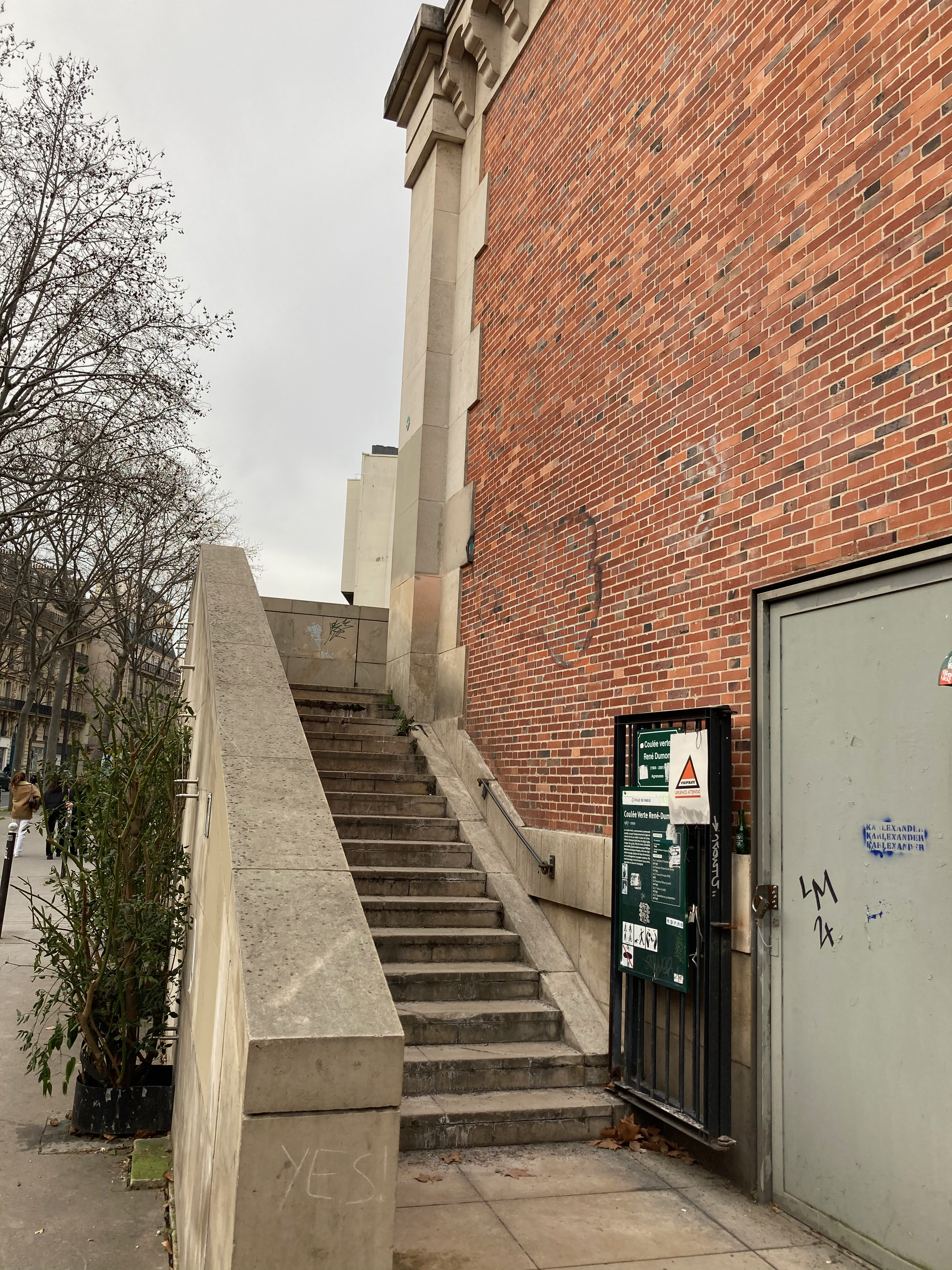
Entry staircase on the rue de Lyon

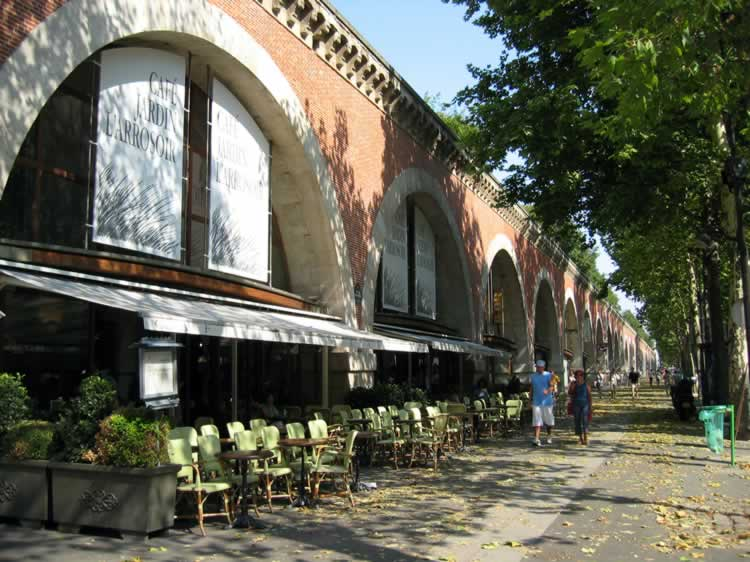
Street-level view of the Viaduc

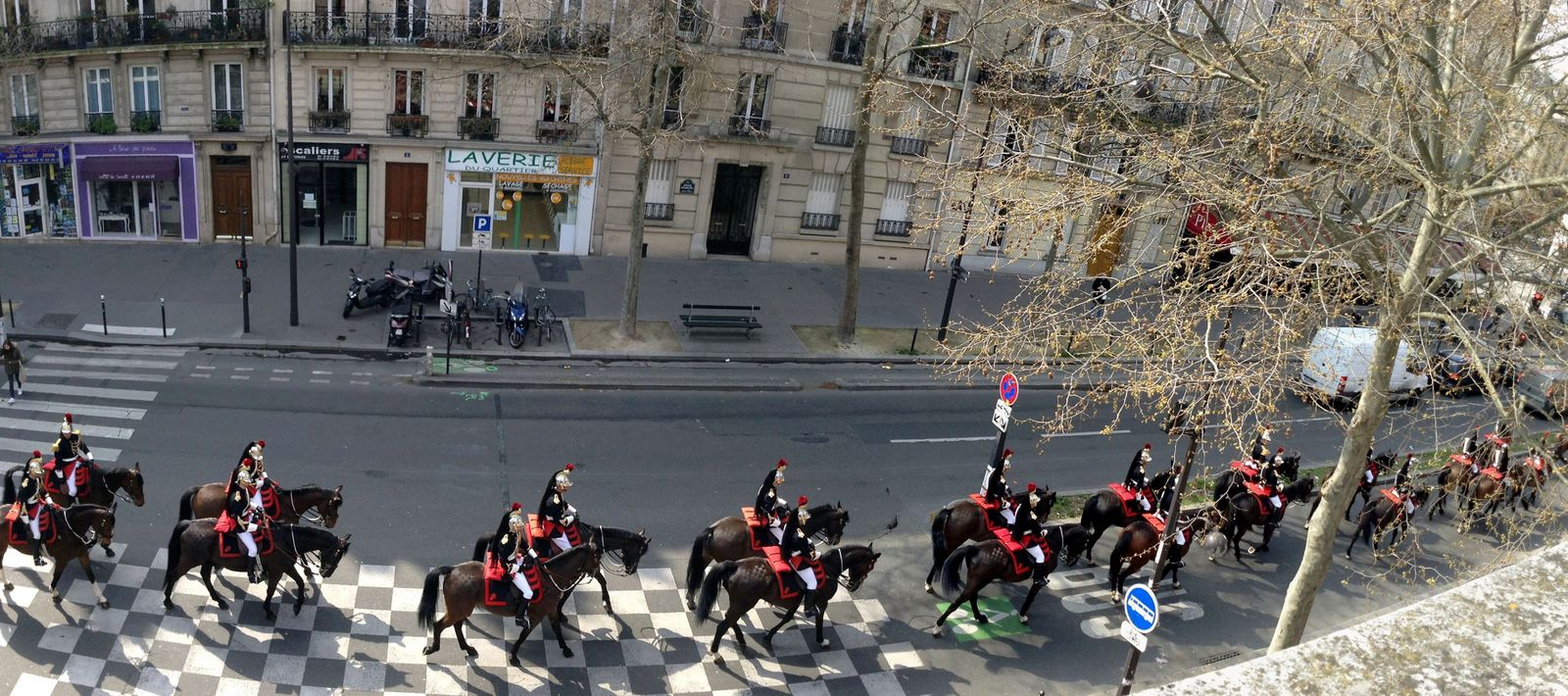
View of the Garde républicaine from the top of the Viaduc

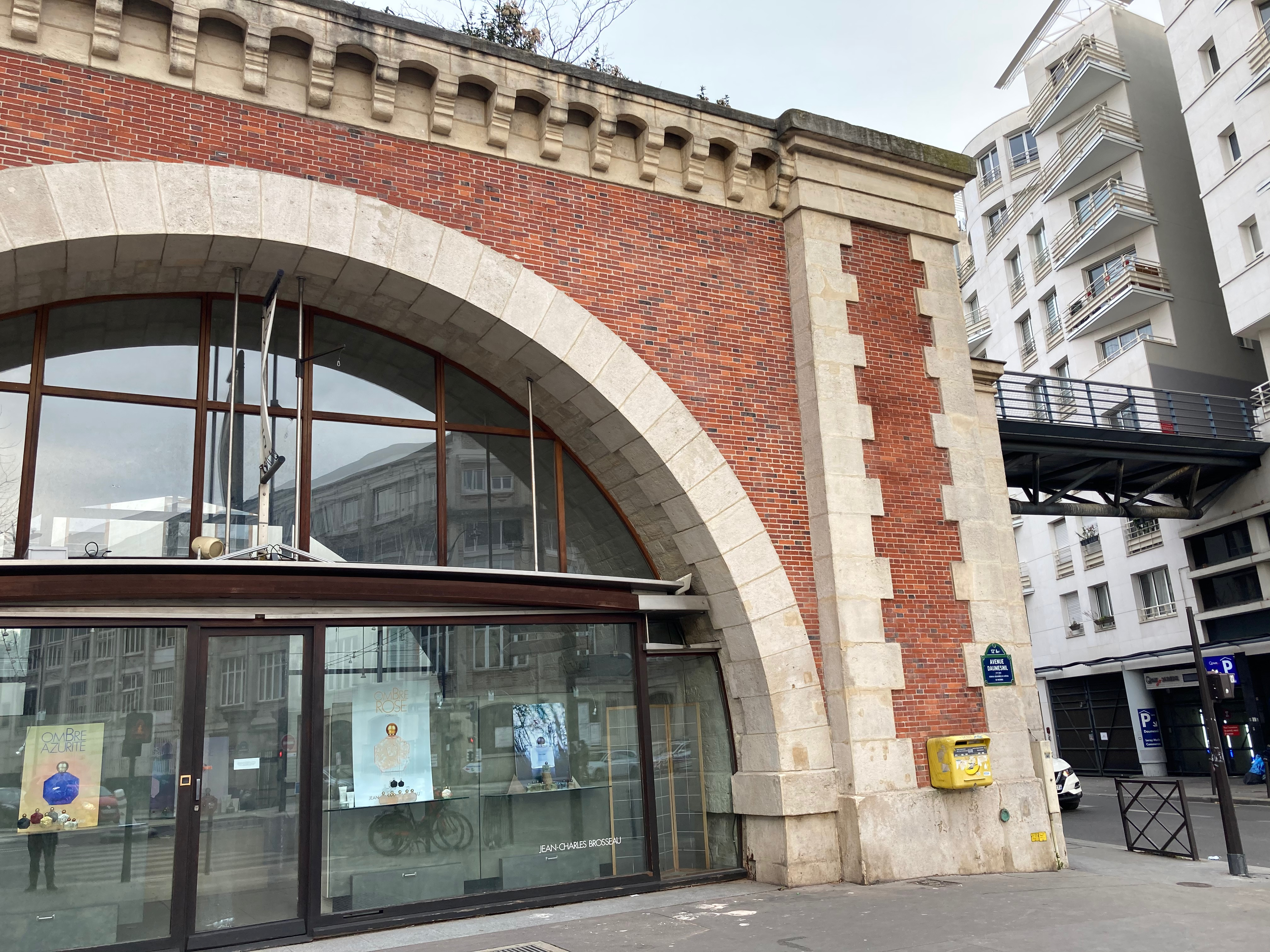
Last vault on the Viaduc at rue de Rambouillet

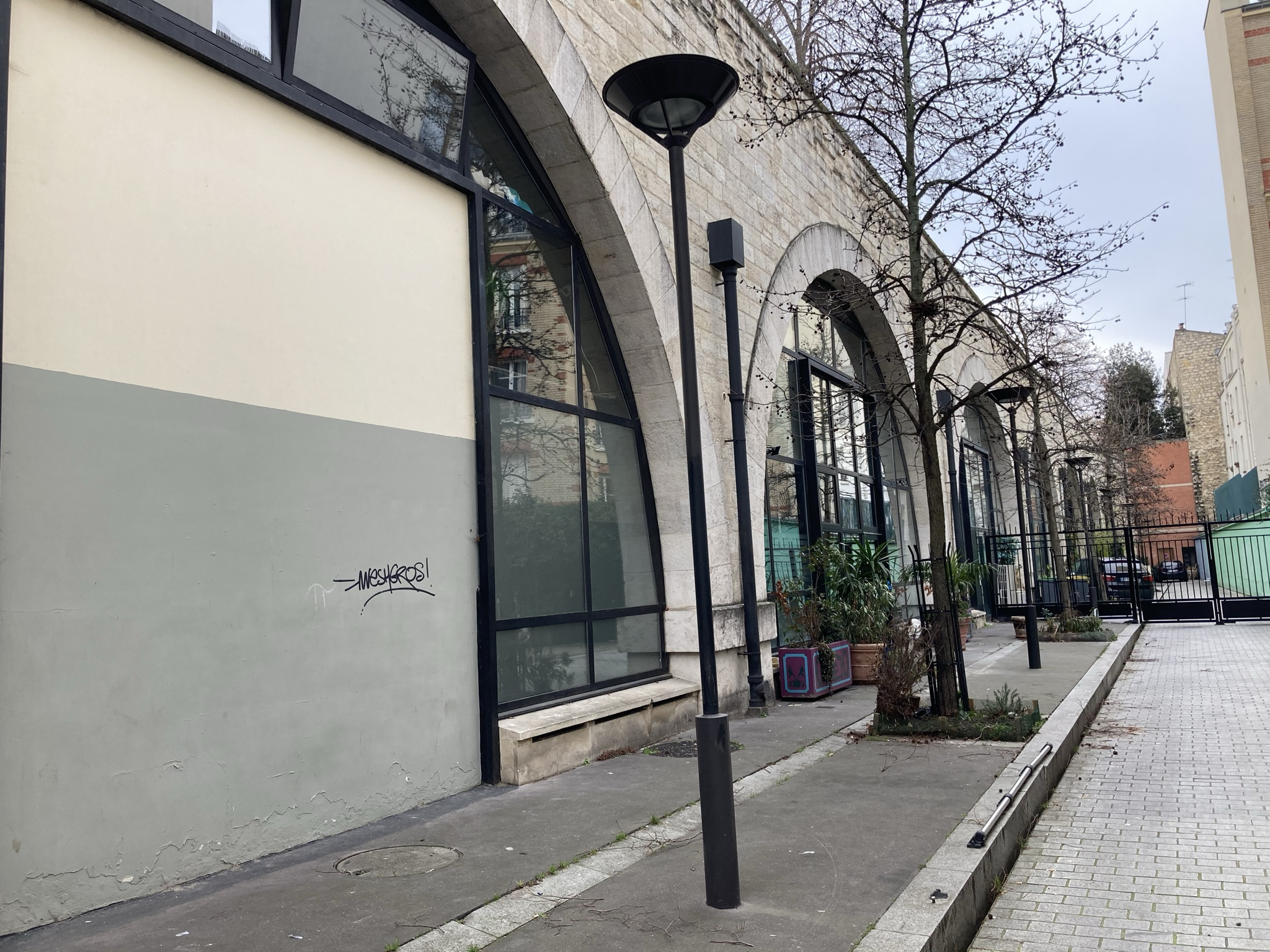
The backside of the Viaduc at the level of the rue de Rambouillet

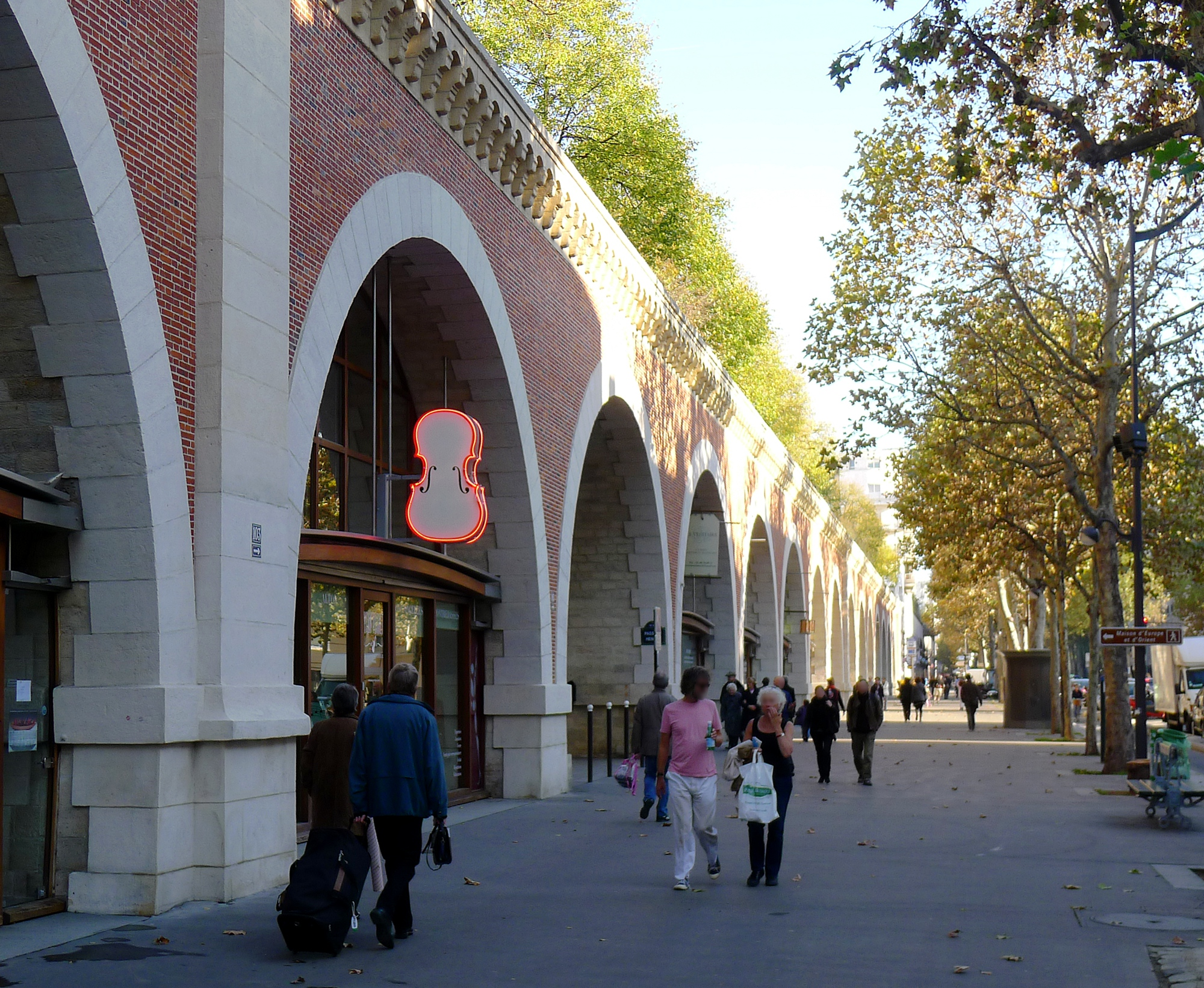
Another view of the Viaduc

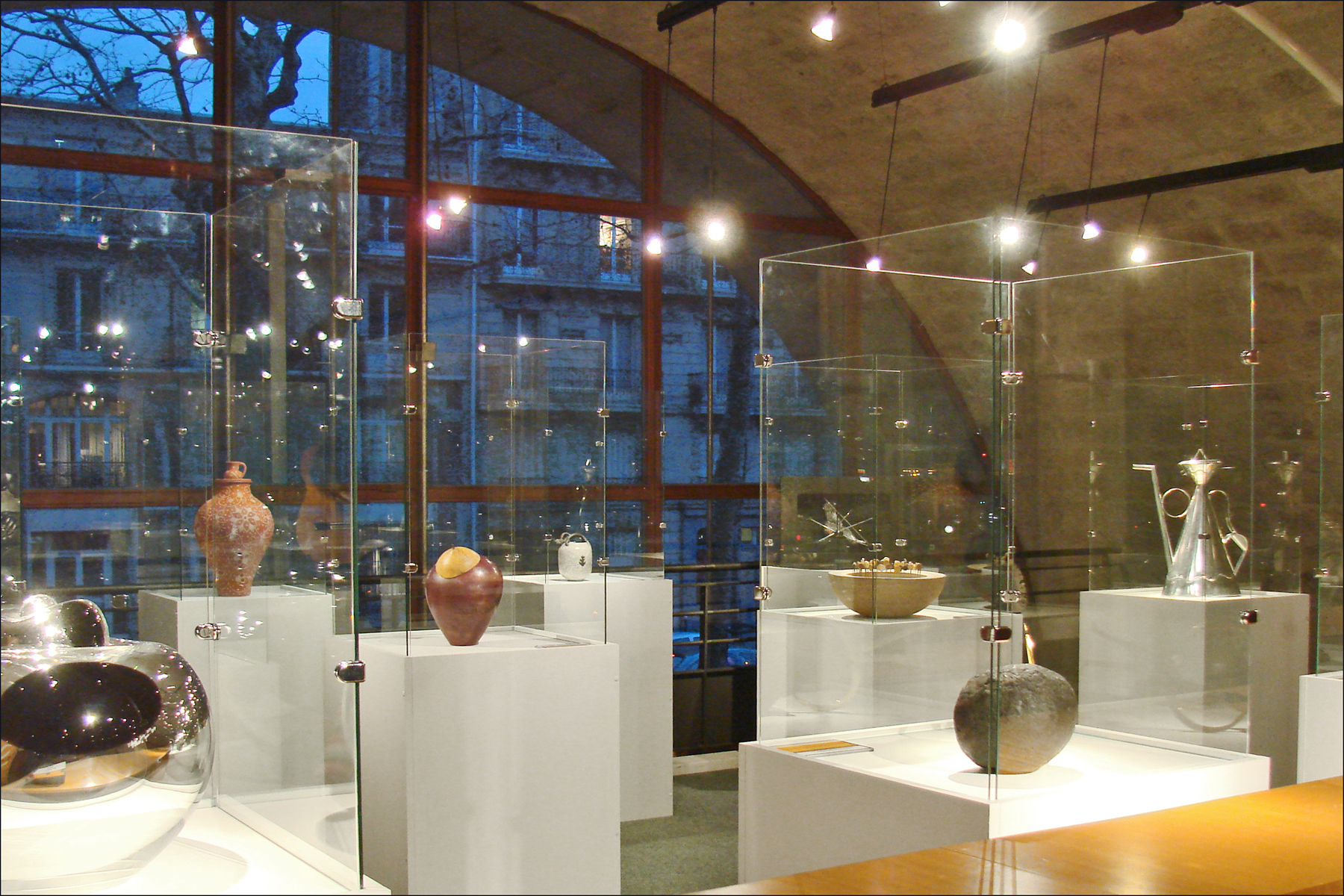
A typical view from the inside of one of the vaults

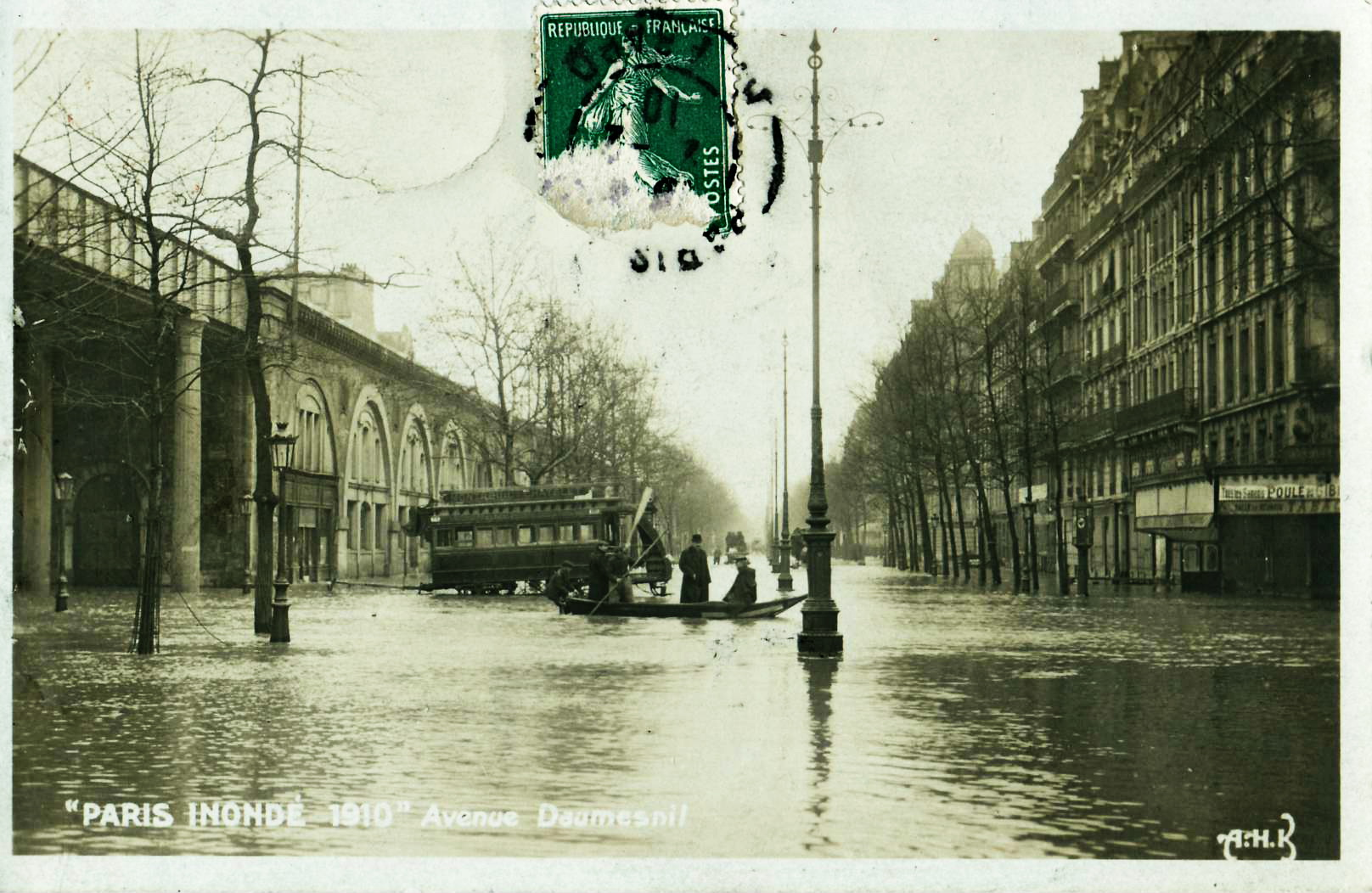
The Viaduc and flooding in 1910

== Workshops along the Viaduc des Arts ==
- Atelier Le Tallec – Handmade porcelain decoration (1995–2015)
- Atelier Maurice Dupont – Music instruments and accessories
- Silka Design Tzuri Gueta – Textile and silicon jewelry
- Ateliers du Temps Passé – Paintings and restoration of art objects
- Aurélie Cherell – Women's fashion and wedding dresses
- Créations Cherif – Contemporary design furniture
- Atelier Michel Fey – Leather work
- Le Bonheur des Dames – Embroidery work
- Tissus Malhia Kent – Textile making for Haute-Couture
- Aisthesis – Art cabinet making
- Atelier Guigue Locca – Restoration and creation of furniture
- Roger Lanne Luthier – Restoration and creation of violins and cellos
- Parasolerie Heurtault – Umbrellas and parasol making

== Cafés and restaurants ==
- Viaduc Café
- Restaurant l'Arrosoir

== See also ==
- 12th arrondissement of Paris
- Coulée verte René-Dumont
