= Quartier Saint-Gervais =

Coordinates: 48.854896545410156°N 2.359072208404541°E

Saint-Gervais
- Quartier Saint-Gervais
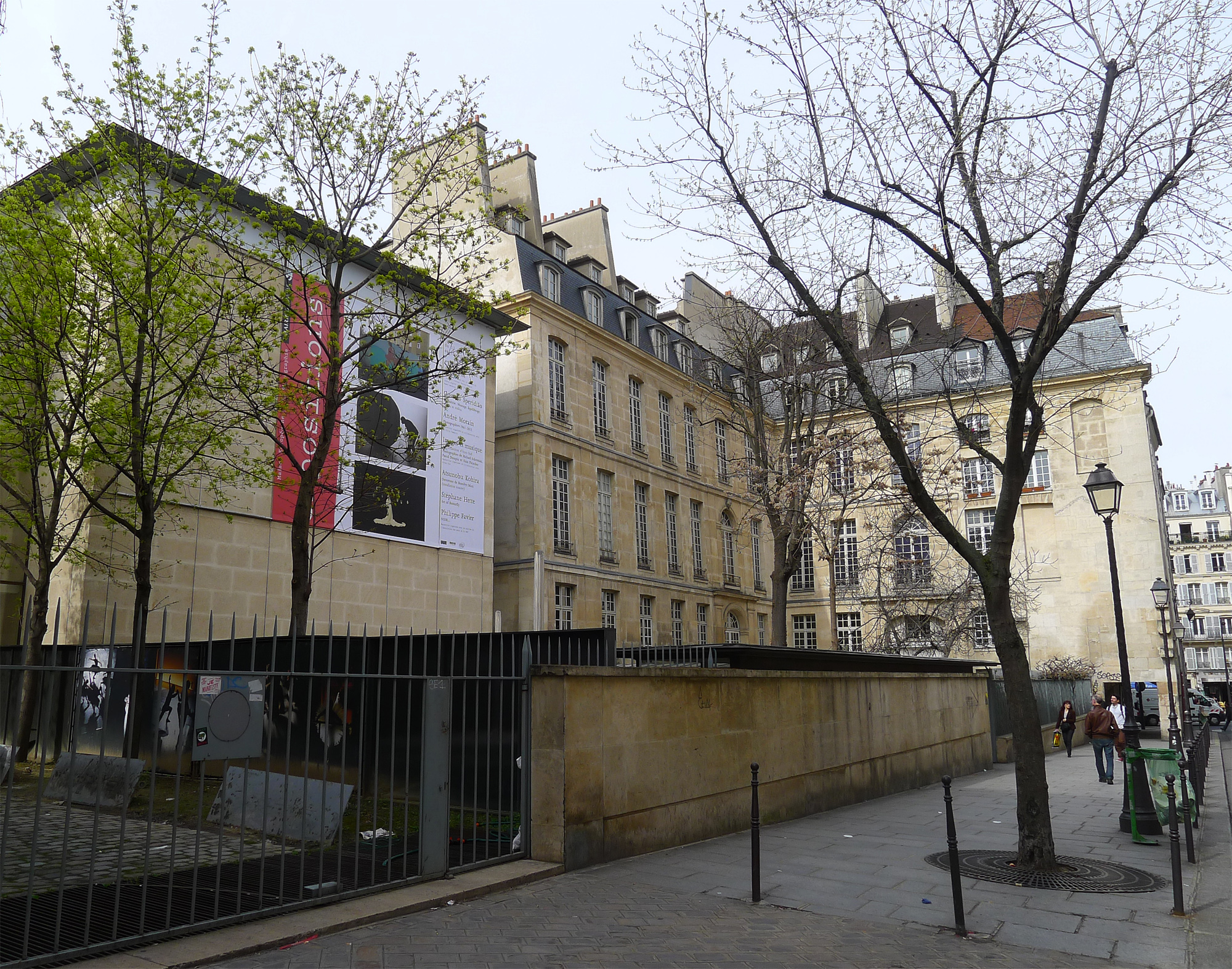
- Maison européenne de la photographie
- Interactive map of Saint-Gervais
- Country: France
- Region: Île-de-France
- Ville: Paris
- Arrondissement: 4th

Area
  - Total: 0.422 km^{2} (0.163 sq mi)

Population (2016)
  - Total: 9,667
  - Density: 22,908/km^{2} (59,330/sq mi)

The Quartier Saint-Gervais is the 14th administrative district of Paris, located in the 4th arrondissement. It takes its name from the martyrs Saint Gervase and Saint Protase—whose legendary lives are recounted in The Golden Legend and to whom the Church of Saint-Gervais-Saint-Protais is dedicated. Under the Ancien régime, it was the church of the building trade guilds.

== Boundaries ==
Administrative location of the quarter within the 4th arrondissement.

The Quartier Saint-Gervais is a rectangle bounded by:

- Rue de Lobau and Rue des Archives to the west (beyond which lies the Quartier Saint-Merri),
- Quai de l'Hôtel-de-Ville and Quai des Célestins to the south (bordering the Seine),
- Rue Saint-Paul and Rue de Turenne to the east (beyond which lies the Quartier de l'Arsenal),
- and to the north by Rue des Francs-Bourgeois (beyond which lies the Quartier des Archives).

== History ==
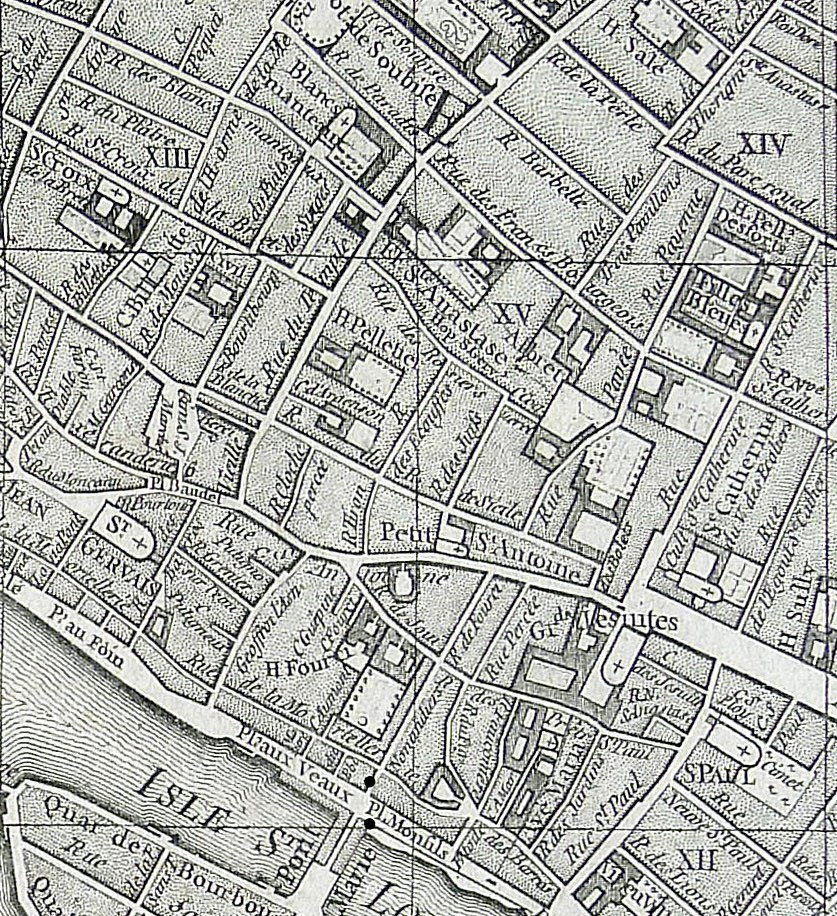
Quartier Saint-Gervais on Vaugondy's map (1760).

The current Quartier Saint-Gervais encompasses the former Saint-Paul district to the east and the Saint-Gervais district to the west, separated by Rue de Fourcy.

Together, they form the southern half of the Marais.

Its southern section—bounded by the Seine, Rue Saint-Paul, Rue Saint-Antoine, and Rue François-Miron—constitutes the area of the former "insalubrious block no. 16" that underwent urban renewal between the 1940s and the 1960s.

== Specific sites ==
- The 4th Arrondissement Town Hall.
- The Crédit Municipal.
- The Bibliothèque historique de la ville de Paris (located in the Hôtel d'Angoulême).
- The Paris Administrative Court (located in the Hôtel d'Aumont).
- The Paris Administrative Court of Appeal (located in the Hôtel de Beauvais).
- The Hôtel de Chalon-Luxembourg.
- The Lycée Charlemagne.
- The Hôtel de Sens.
- Village Saint-Paul: a complex of courtyards and small inner courts featuring antique dealers, art galleries, restaurants, and more. This entire neighborhood was declared unfit for habitation in the 1950s and 1960s; it was slated for demolition but was narrowly saved by the Malraux Law, which protected the Marais district.
- The Church of Saint-Gervais-Saint-Protais.
- The Church of Saint-Paul-Saint-Louis.
- The Church of Notre-Dame-des-Blancs-Manteaux.
- Rue des Rosiers (the Pletzl, the center of Jewish life in the neighborhood).
- The Shoah Memorial and the Allée des Justes-parmi-les-Nations.
- Remains of the wall of Philip II Augustus.
- A high concentration of gay-oriented shops, bars, and restaurants is found in this neighborhood.
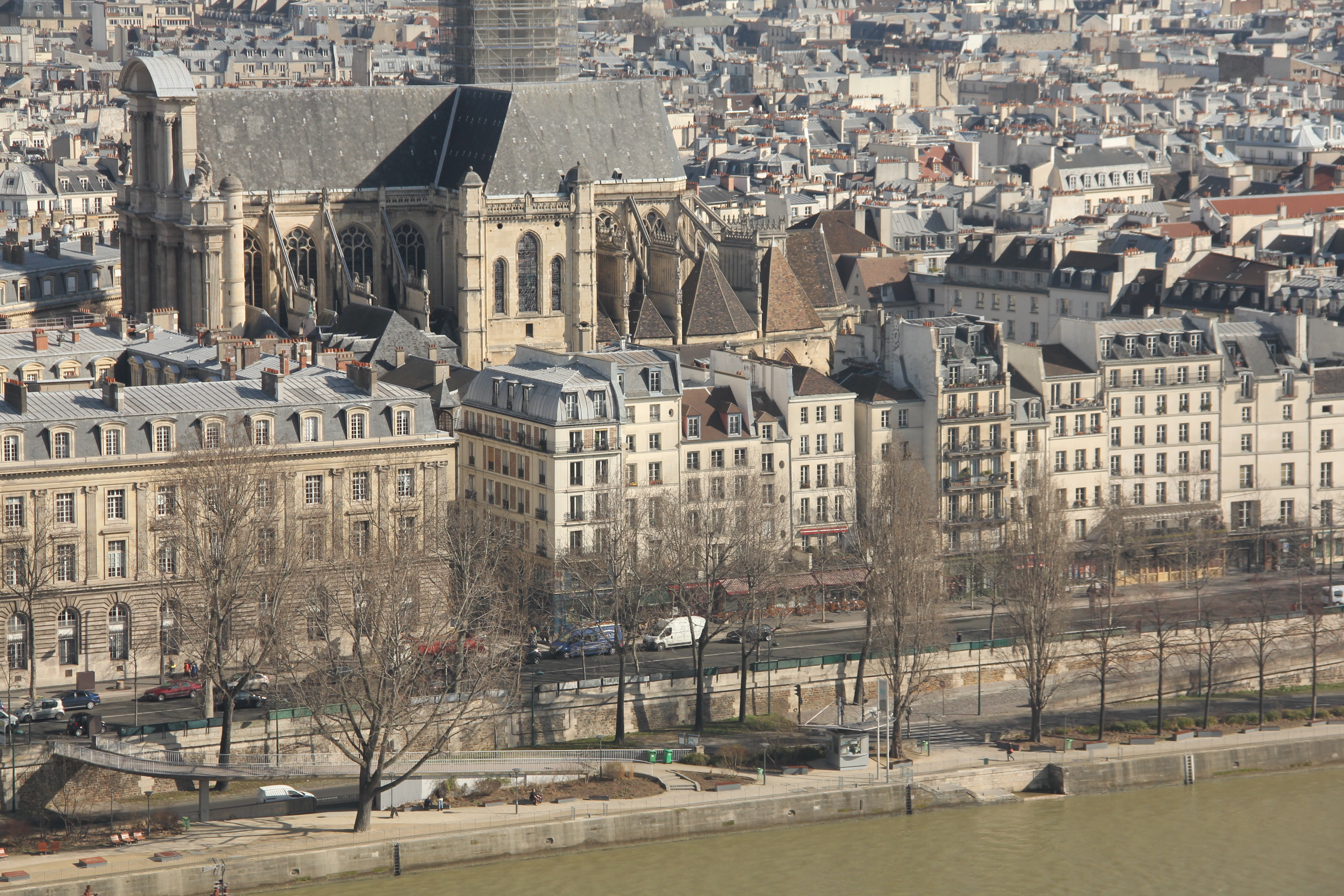
The Church of Saint-Gervais-Saint-Protais within the neighborhood.

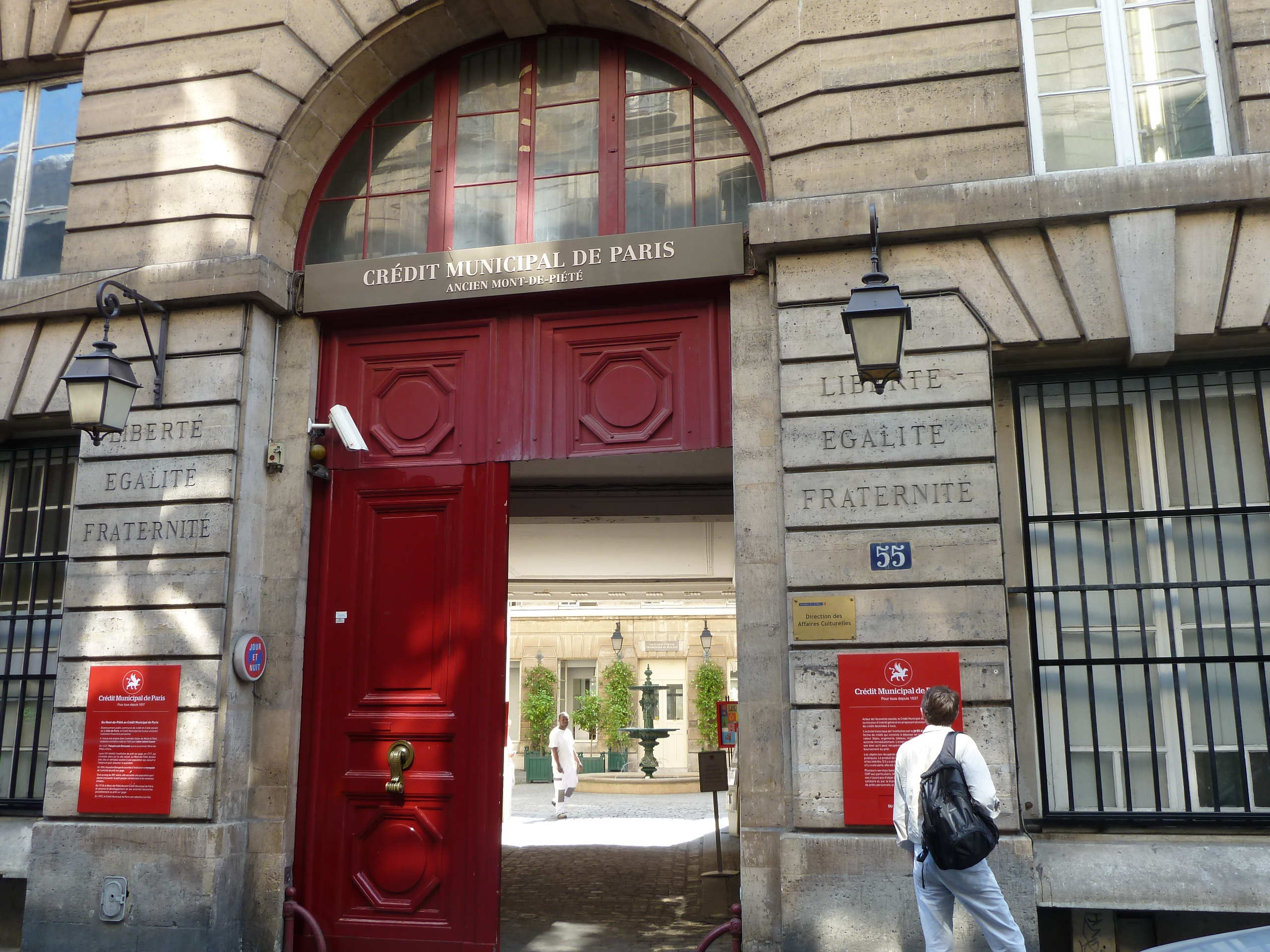
Entrance to the Crédit Municipal de Paris.

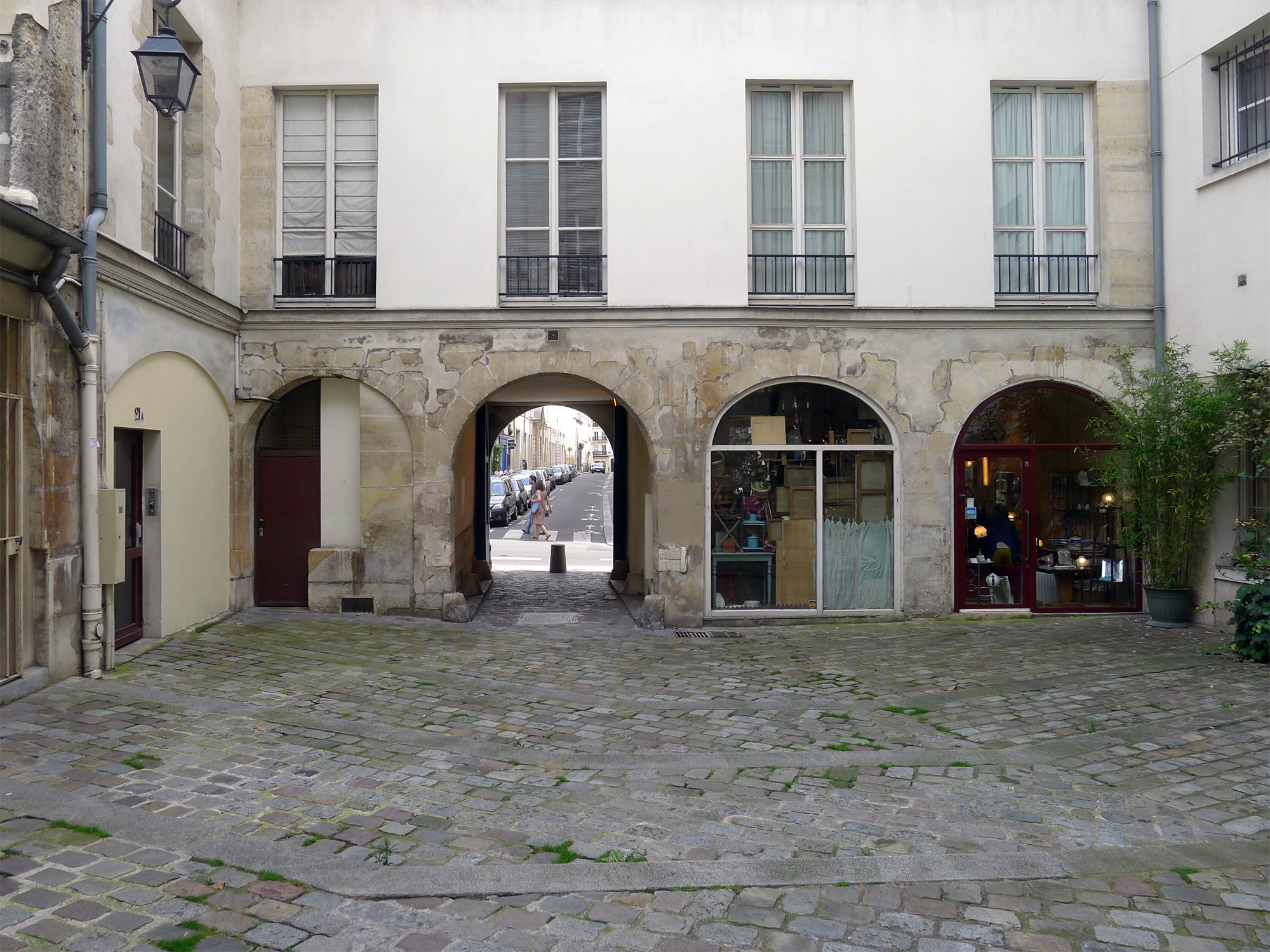
One of the courtyards of the Village Saint-Paul.

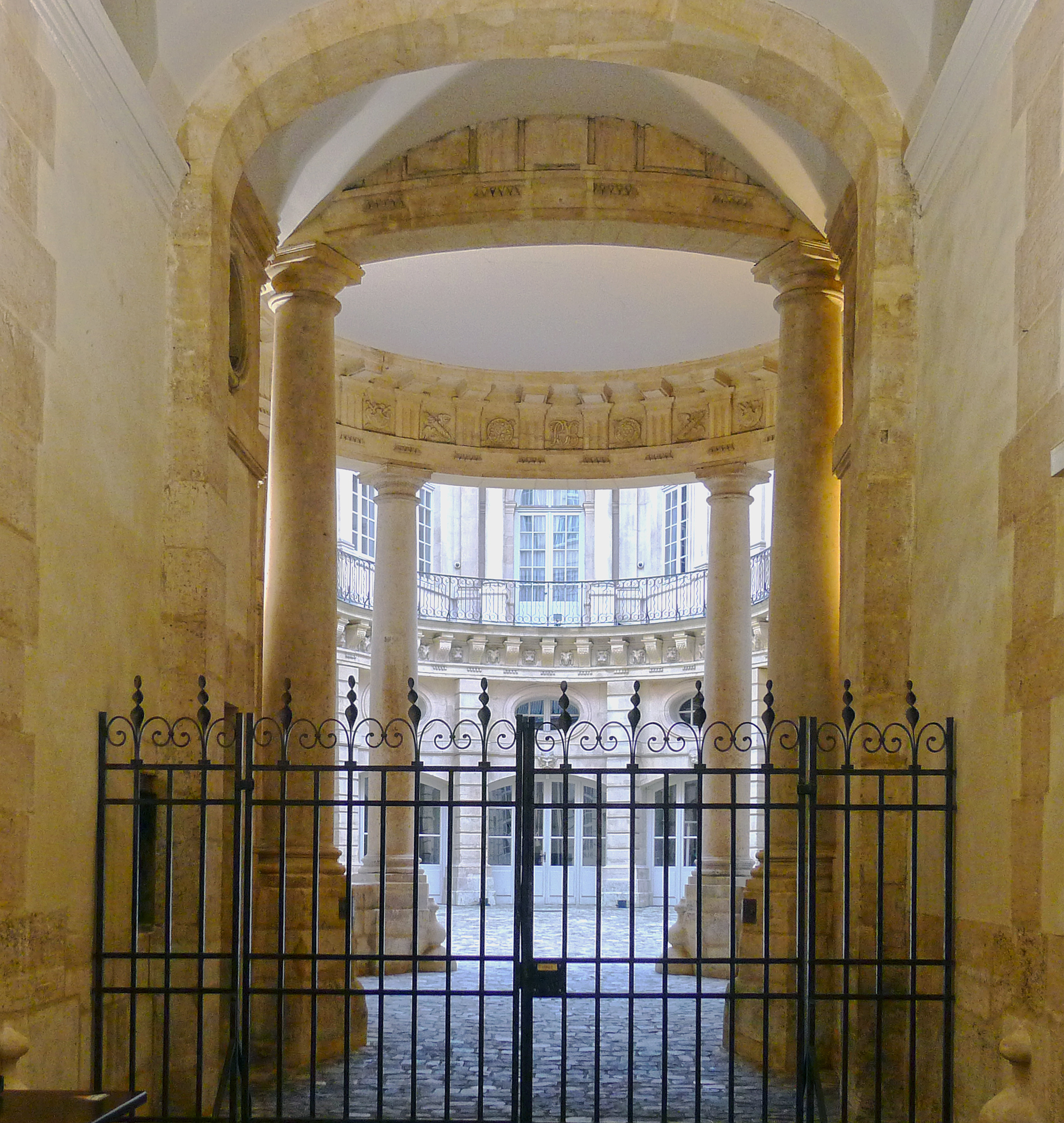
Entrance to the Hôtel de Beauvais.

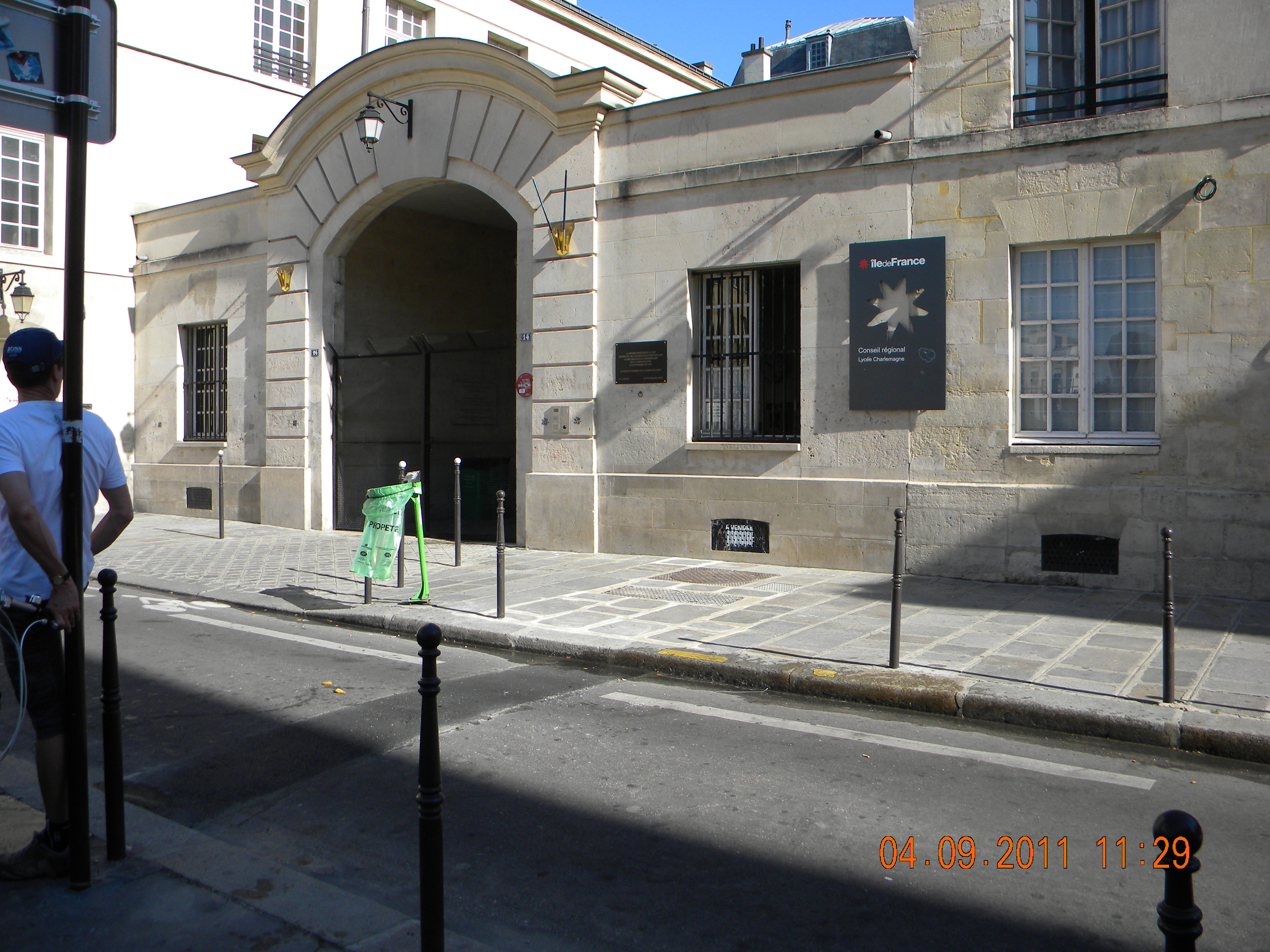
One of the entrances of Lycée Charlemagne.

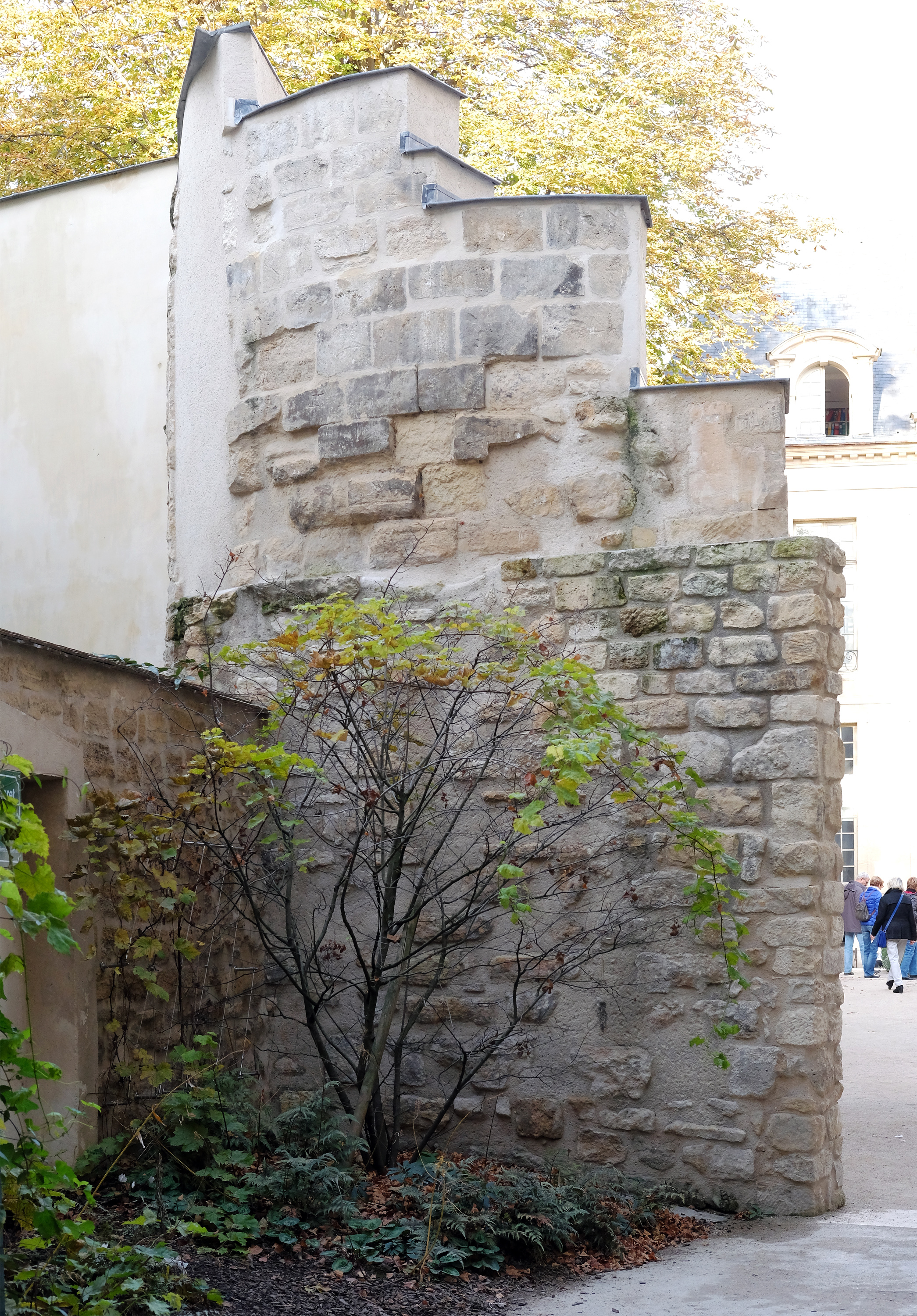
Remains of a tower from the Philippe-Auguste wall in the Jardin des Rosiers – Joseph-Migneret.
