= Vaugondy =

Vaugondy may refer to:

== People ==
- Didier Robert de Vaugondy (1723–1786), French geographer.
- Robert de Vaugondy (1688–1766), French cartographer

== Other uses ==
- Vaugondy Island, island on Antarctica
