= Quartier Saint-Merri =

Coordinates: 48.8590829°N 2.3508047°E

Saint-Merri
- Quartier Sainte-Avoye
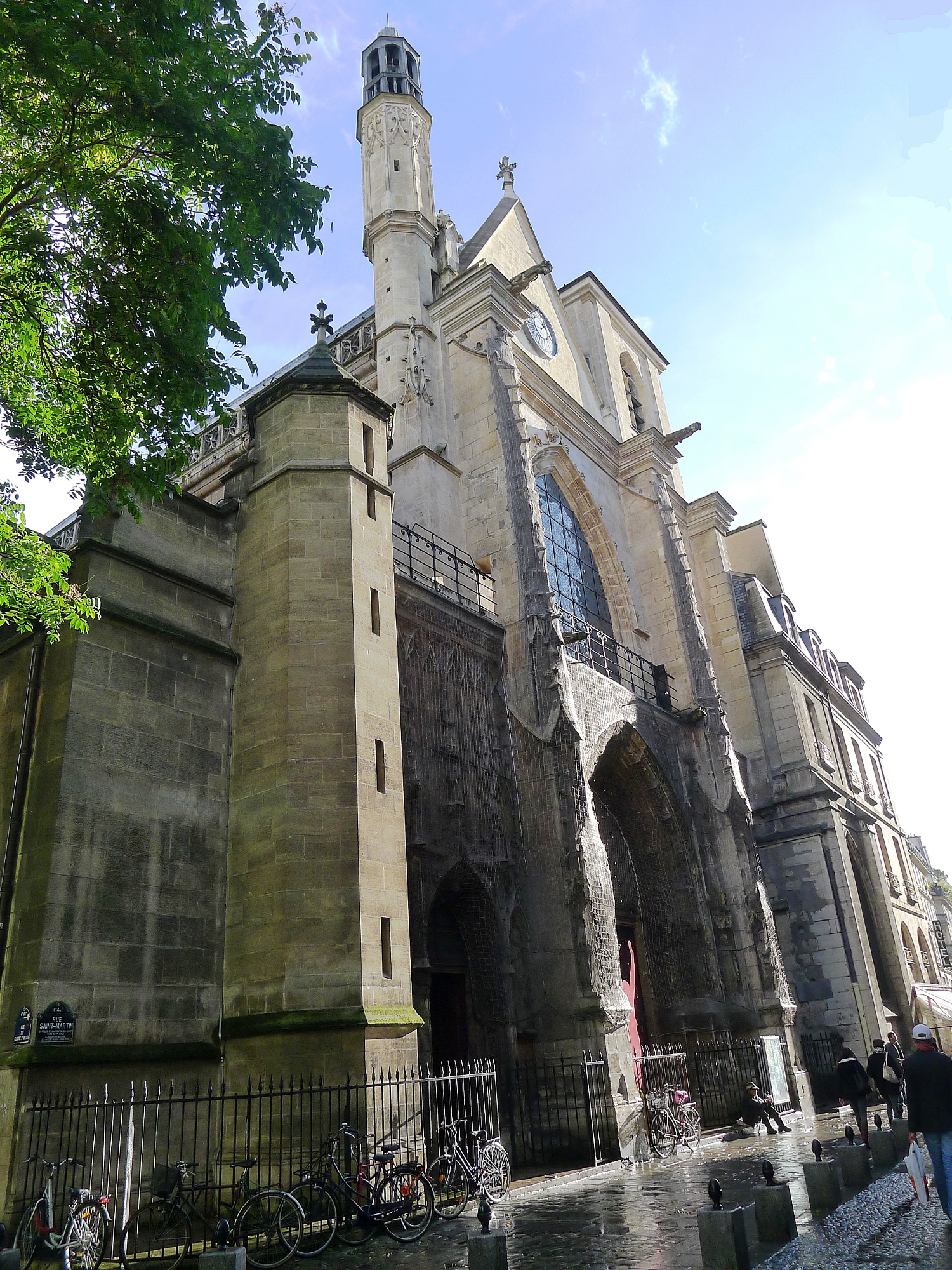
- Saint-Merri
- Interactive map of Saint-Merri
- Country: France
- Region: Île-de-France
- Ville: Paris
- Arrondissement: 4th

Area
  - Total: 0.313 km^{2} (0.121 sq mi)

Population (2016)
  - Total: 6,074
  - Density: 19,406/km^{2} (50,260/sq mi)

The Quartier Saint-Merri is the 13th administrative district of Paris, located in the 4th arrondissement.

== Location and access ==
Located on the Rive Droite, this neighborhood in the heart of Paris is bounded to the north by Rue Rambuteau (adjoining the Quartier Sainte-Avoye of the 3rd arrondissement); to the east by Rue des Archives and Rue de Lobau (adjoining the Quartier Saint-Gervais of the 4th arrondissement); to the south by the main channel of the Seine, separating it from the part of the Île de la Cité located in the Quartier Notre-Dame of the 4th arrondissement; and finally, to the west—adjoining the Quartier des Halles of the 1st arrondissement—the boundary follows the line of the northern section of the Pont au Change, the eastern roadway of Place du Châtelet, and then Boulevard de Sébastopol.

== Origin of the name ==
The neighborhood is named after Saint Merry, a 7th-century hermit and monk, to whom the Church of Saint-Merri is dedicated.

Administrative location of the quarter within the current 4th arrondissement.

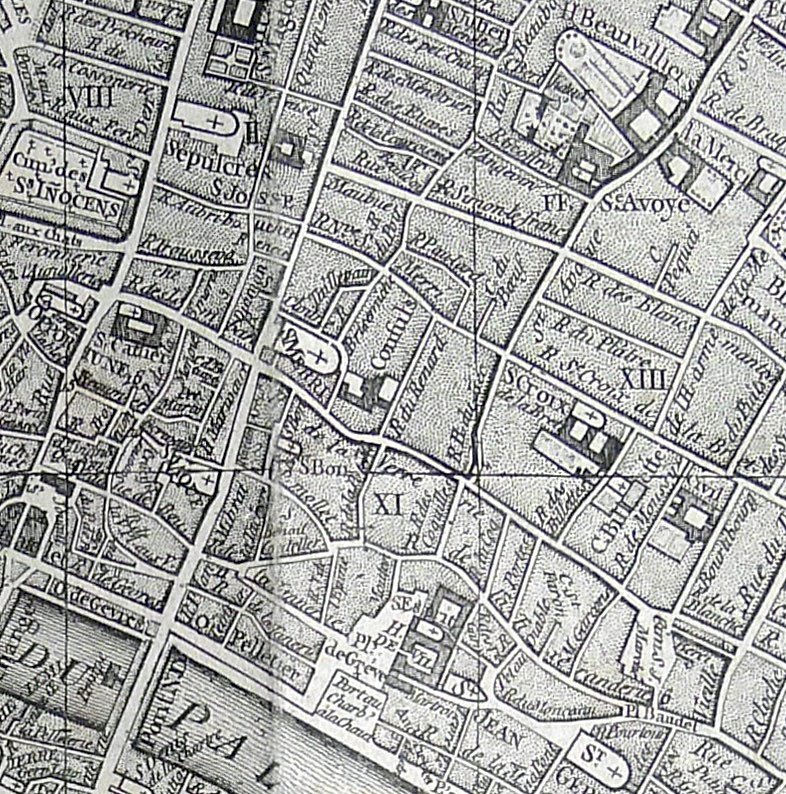
The area surrounding the Church of Saint-Merri on the Vaugondy map (1760).

== Key sites ==
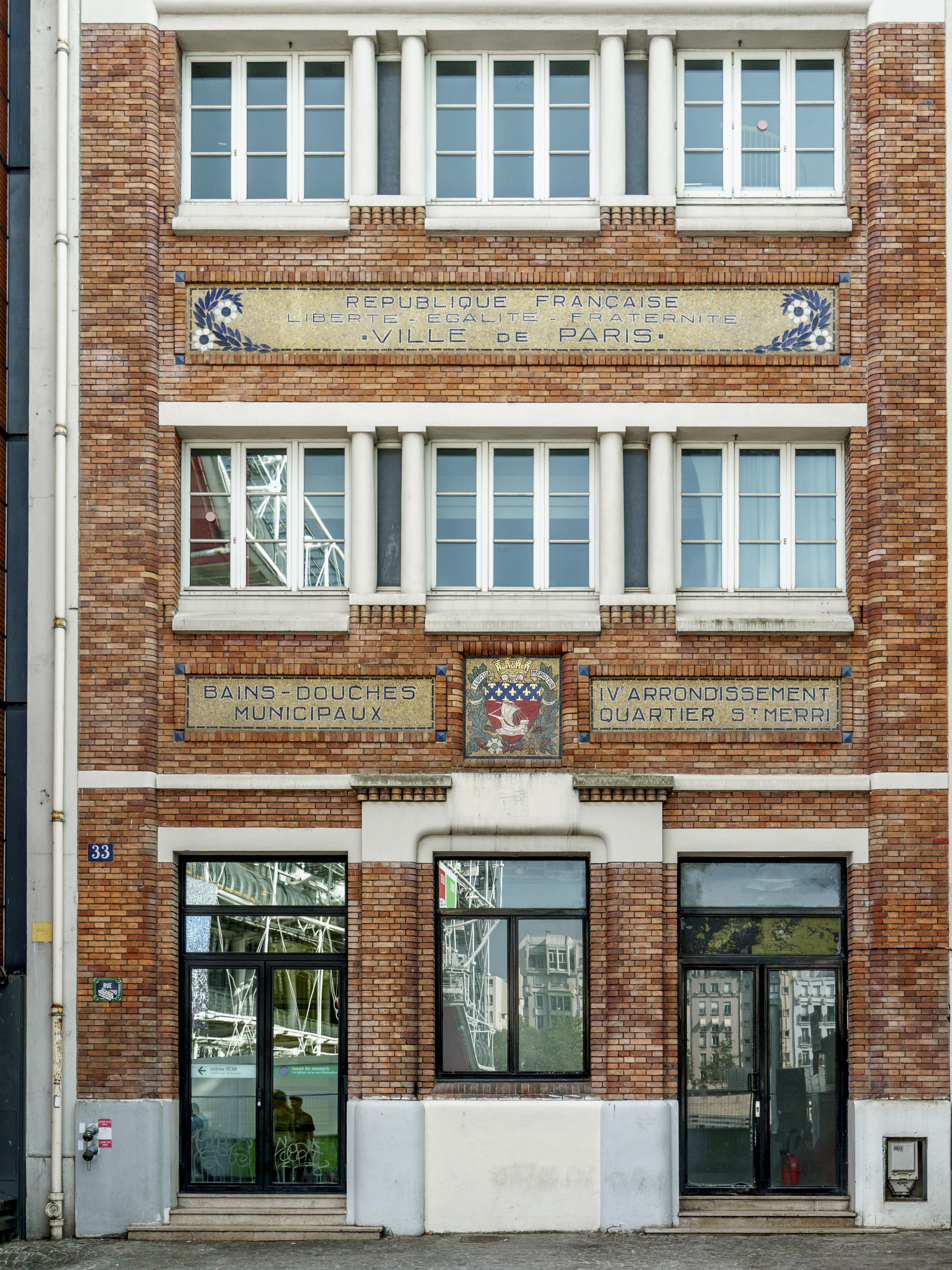
Former public baths and showers, at 33 Rue Saint-Merri.

- Bazar de l'Hôtel de Ville (officially Le BHV Marais since 2013).
- Centre national d'art et de culture Georges-Pompidou :
  - Bibliothèque publique d'information ;
  - IRCAM ;
  - Musée national d'Art moderne.
- Saint-Merri ;
- Stravinsky Fountain ;
- Hôtel de ville de Paris ;
- Théâtre de la Ville – Sarah-Bernhardt ;
- Tour Saint-Jacques.
