= Assassination of Henry IV =

1610 killing of the French king in Paris

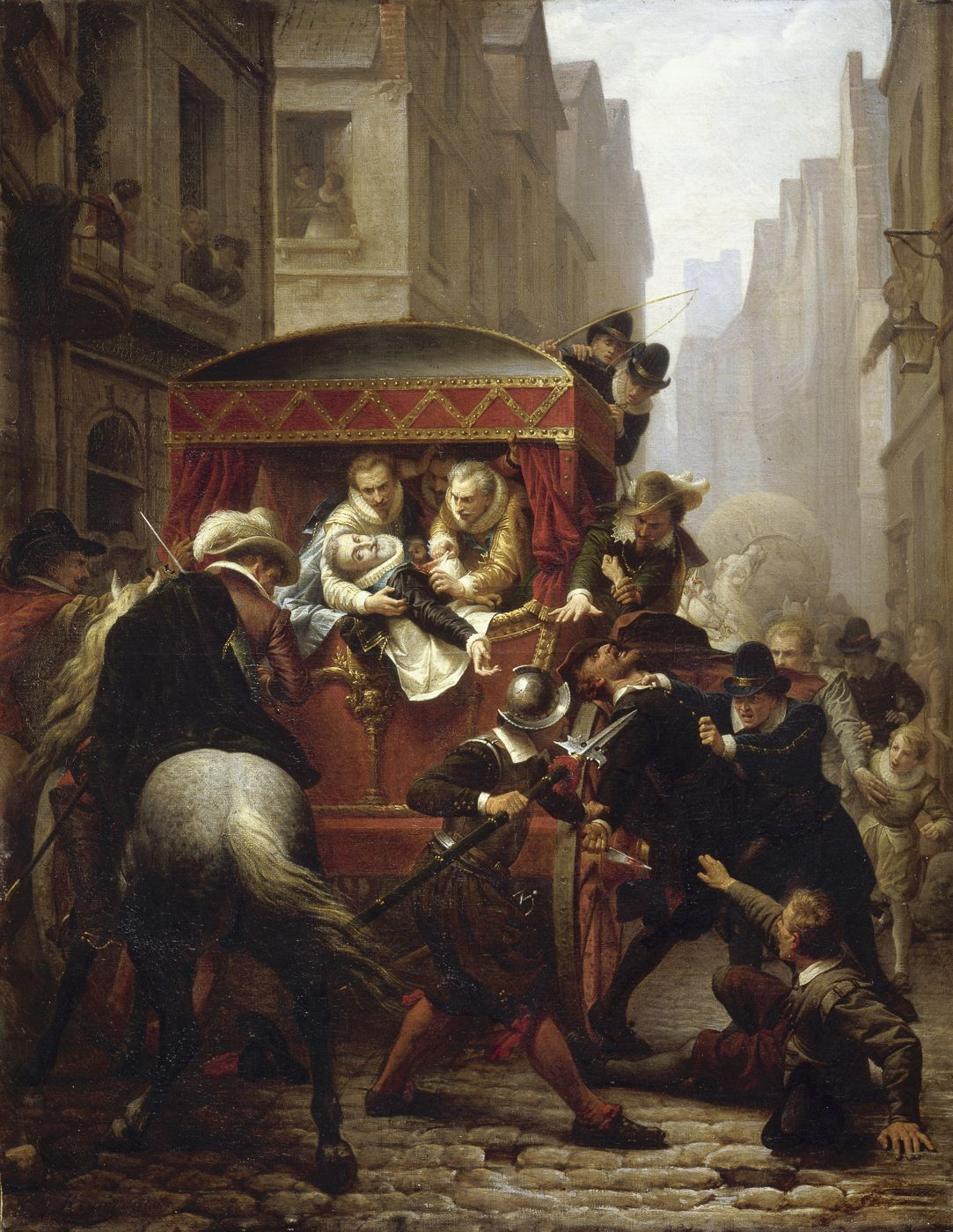
- Location: Paris, France
- Date: 14 May 1610
- Target: Henry IV
- Attack type: Assassination
- Weapon: Knife
- Deaths: 1
- Motive: Fanaticism
- Convicted: François Ravaillac

The assassination of Henry IV of France on May 14, 1610, in Paris was one of the most momentous assassinations in French history. The king, founder of the House of Bourbon on the French throne and known as Good King Henry, fell victim to an assassination attempt by the fanatical Catholic assassin François Ravaillac. The assassination took place during a politically tense period marked by religious conflicts between Catholics and Huguenots, as well as foreign policy tensions in Europe. Henry's death triggered a deep crisis in the French kingdom and had far-reaching consequences for the further development of France and Europe.

== Background ==
Henry IV, originally a Huguenot and King of Navarre, ascended the French throne after the death of Henry III in 1589. In the midst of the bloody Huguenot Wars, which tore France apart between Catholics and Protestants, Henry IV faced the challenge of uniting a deeply divided country. In order to pacify the Catholic majority of the country and secure the crown, he converted to Catholicism in 1593 – allegedly with the words Paris is worth a Mass. This change made him a traitor to many Protestants, and he remained a former heretic to radical Catholics. With the Edict of Nantes in 1598, Henry IV attempted to establish religious tolerance by granting limited rights to the Huguenots. Although it ended the violence of the Huguenot Wars, the edict met with fierce resistance from Catholic hardliners, who saw it as a threat to the supremacy of the Catholic Church. At the same time, Henry's policy of strengthening France economically and consolidating the power of the monarchy drew the ire of various factions of the nobility. They saw their privileges threatened by Henry's reforms and were partly hostile toward him.

=== Francois Ravaillac ===
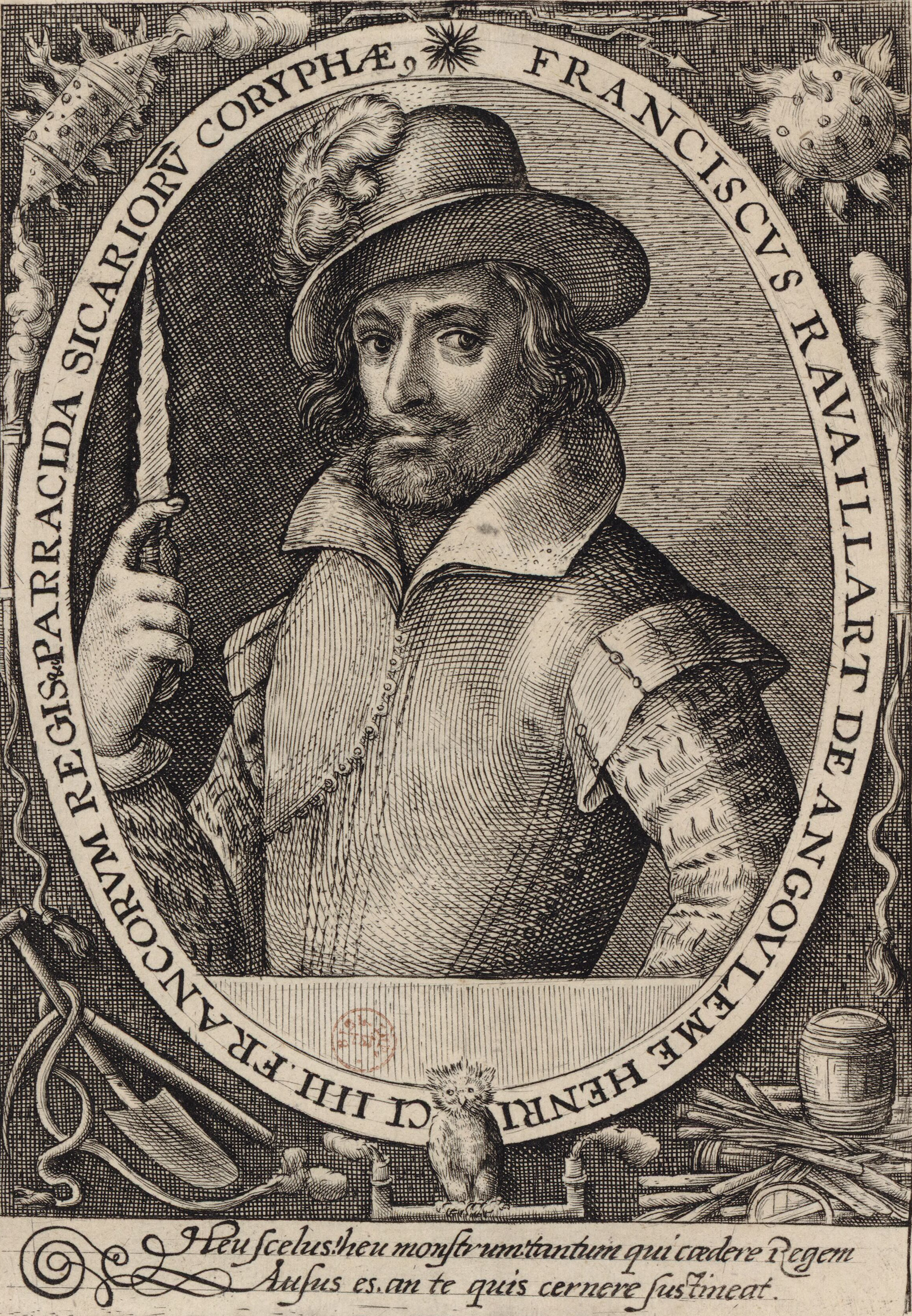
François Ravaillac

Francois Ravaillac was born in Angoulême in 1578 to humble parents. He initially worked as a minor provincial lawyer. Due to debts, he was imprisoned by some of his creditors. During this time, he became radicalized. After his release, he joined the Congregation of the Feuillants, but was expelled again due to his hallucinations and eccentric behavior. He tried to join the Society of Jesus, but was rejected again. He returned to his original profession as a lawyer, but was unable to secure a decent livelihood. Ravaillac was falsely accused of involvement in a murder but acquitted. Due to the debts he had accumulated for his defense, he was thrown back into prison. There he developed the delusional belief that he was destined to serve as the pope's most important protector.

== Prelude ==
After the death of the last Duke of Jülich-Kleve-Berg on March 25, 1609, a dispute arose over his succession, as there were no direct heirs. Several European powers, including Spain and the Habsburgs, had a keen interest in this region, as it was strategically important and played a key role in controlling the Rhine areas. Henry IV saw this crisis as an opportunity to weaken Habsburg supremacy in Europe and to act as protector of the Protestant princes in the Holy Roman Empire. By early May, preparations for the campaign were already in full swing, and Henry had mobilized a large army.

Back in December 1609, Ravaillac had tried unsuccessfully to speak to Henry IV while he was traveling through Paris. Later, in Angoulême, Ravaillac heard rumors that the king was planning to support the Protestants in Germany against the pope. It was said that the papal legate had threatened excommunication, to which Henry allegedly replied that his predecessors had placed the popes on their thrones and that he could depose them if he were excommunicated. These rumors led to further mental instability and made him believe that it was sacrilegious to oppose the Pope. When he returned to Paris in April 1610, he spoke with the king's troops, who expressed their willingness to fight against the pope – something he found unbearable. Convinced that the Pope was God and God was the Pope, Ravaillac decided to assassinate the king. Shortly after his return to Paris, Ravaillac took a knife from an inn and kept it hidden in his pocket for three weeks while he waited for the right moment to fulfill his supposedly divine mission.

Despite his intentions, he could not bring himself to do so and decided once again to return to Angoulême. On his way there, he passed a crucifix near Étampes. The sight of Christ on the cross, crowned with thorns, struck him deeply, as if it were reproaching him for his lack of courage and loyalty. Overwhelmed by this impression, he immediately turned back and arrived in Paris shortly before the queen's coronation, which was scheduled for May 13.

== Assassination ==
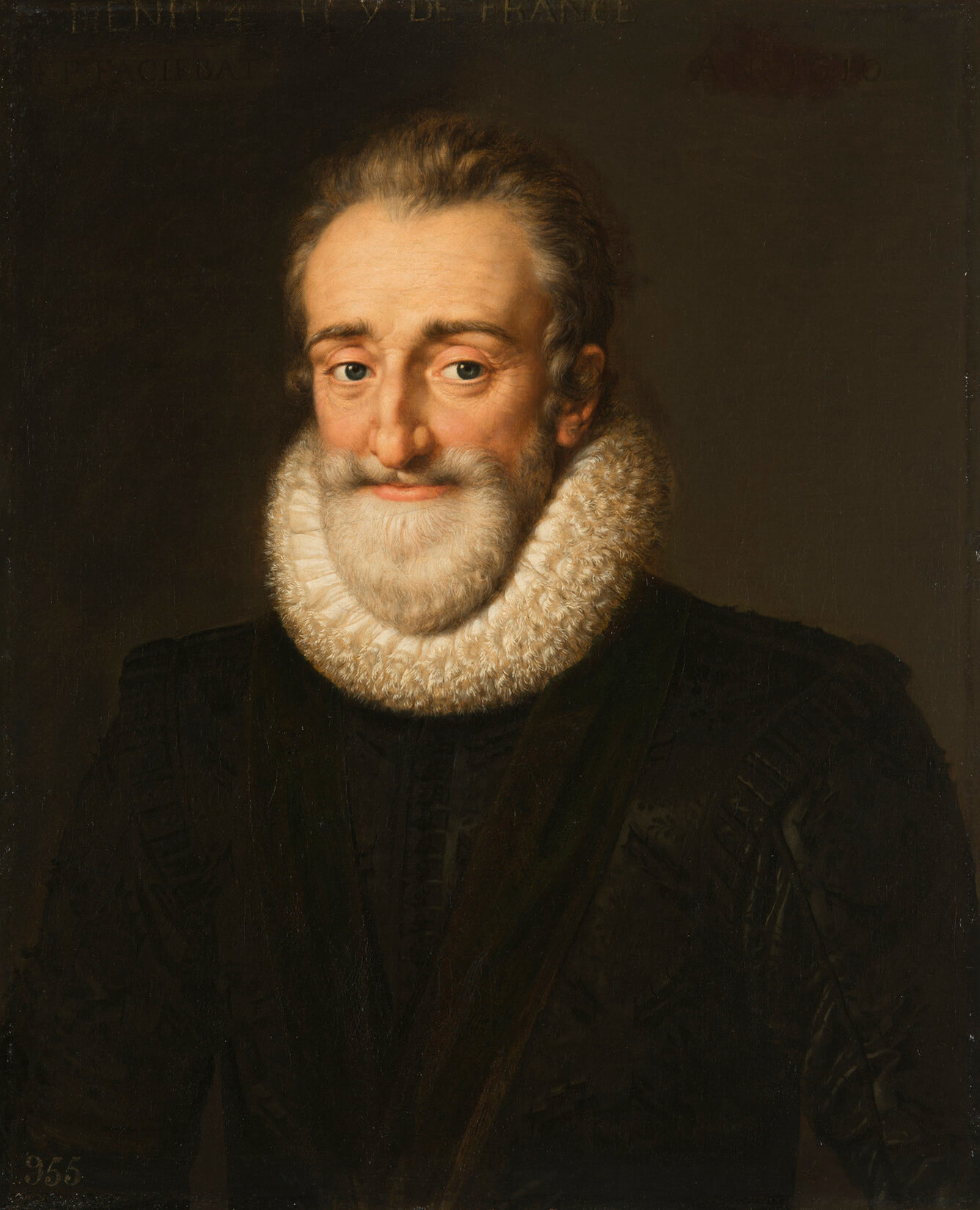
Henri IV by F. Pourbus the Younger

On May 14, at around two or three in the afternoon, the king had his carriage brought around, as he intended to visit the Quartier de l'Arsenal and meet with the Duke of Sully, his finance minister. He left the Louvre accompanied by the Duke of Montbazon, the Duke of Épernon, Marshals Lavardin, Roquelaure, and La Force, as well as the Marquis of Mirebeau and his chief equerry, Liancourt. There was a brief discussion between the king and Nicolas de L'Hôpital, the captain of the guard, about whether the king wanted to be accompanied by his guards, but the king declined. Instead, the king decided to travel with only a small group of nobles—some rode in the carriage, others rode on horseback, and a few walked.

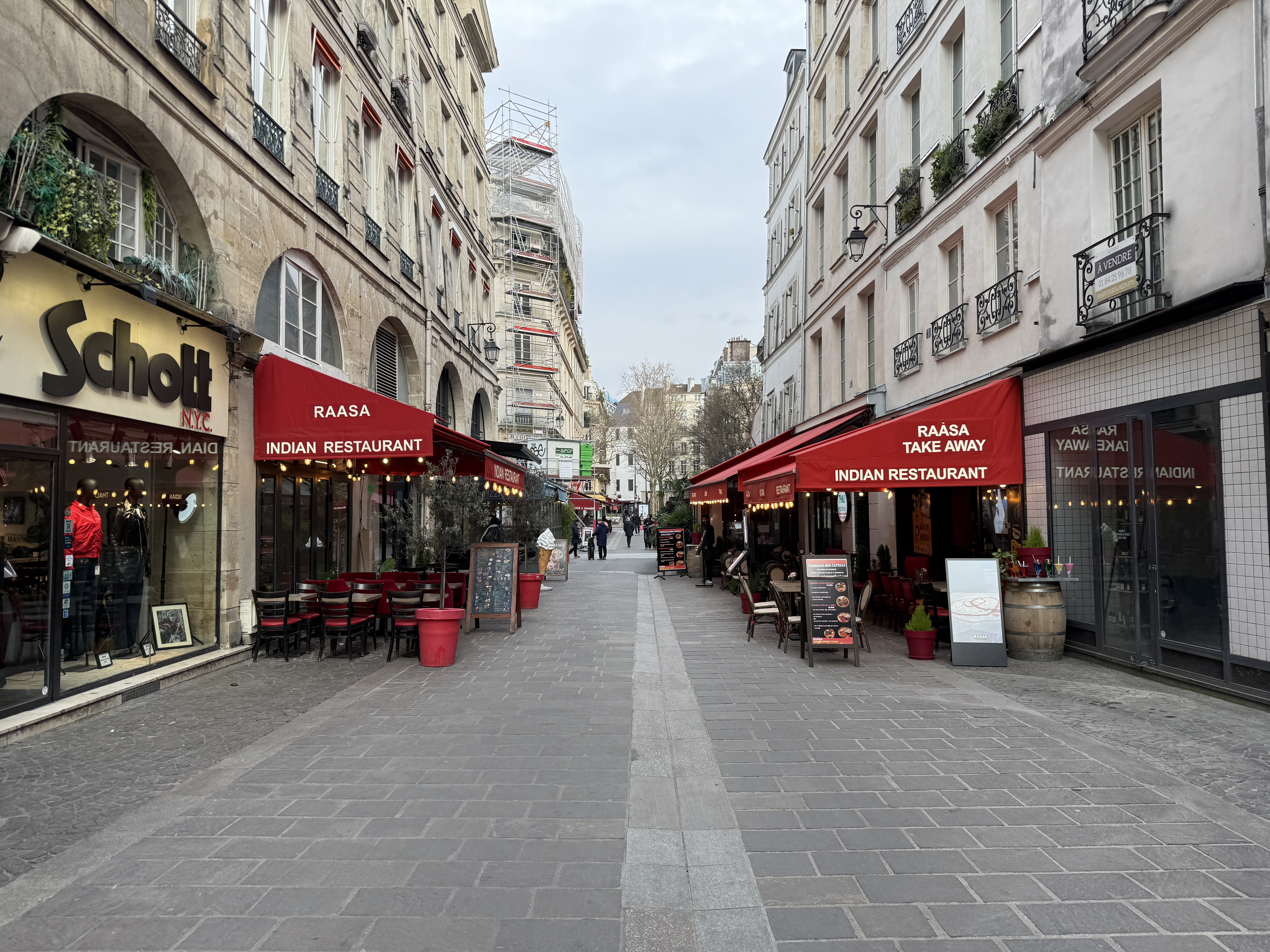
The Rue de la Ferronnerie as it is today

As it was a pleasant day, the king decided to pull back the leather curtains of the carriage to enjoy the weather. He sat on the left side of the carriage, Épernon to his right, while Montbazon and Lavardin sat opposite them. Their route took them along the Croix-du-Tiroir, then onto the Rue Saint-Honoré, before turning onto the Rue de la Ferronnerie, a street bordering the large Saint-Innocent cemetery. Rue de la Ferronnerie was narrow and busy, and soon the carriage had to stop due to a traffic obstruction caused by a wine cart and a hay wagon blocking the way. Ravaillac had taken up position at the gates of the Louvre early that morning and had followed the carriage with the king to this point.

The royal carriage stopped opposite the office of a notary named Pontrain. At this point, most of the servants accompanying the carriage took a shortcut through the Saint-Innocent cemetery to meet up with the carriage at the end of the street. Of the two remaining servants, one went ahead to ease the traffic congestion, while the other paused to tie his garter. Inside the carriage, the king and the nobles listened to the Duke of Épernon, who read a letter that the king had given him. Henry, who had forgotten his glasses, relied on Épernon to read what was probably a memorandum from the Count of Soissons, a disgruntled nobleman who had recently left the royal court.

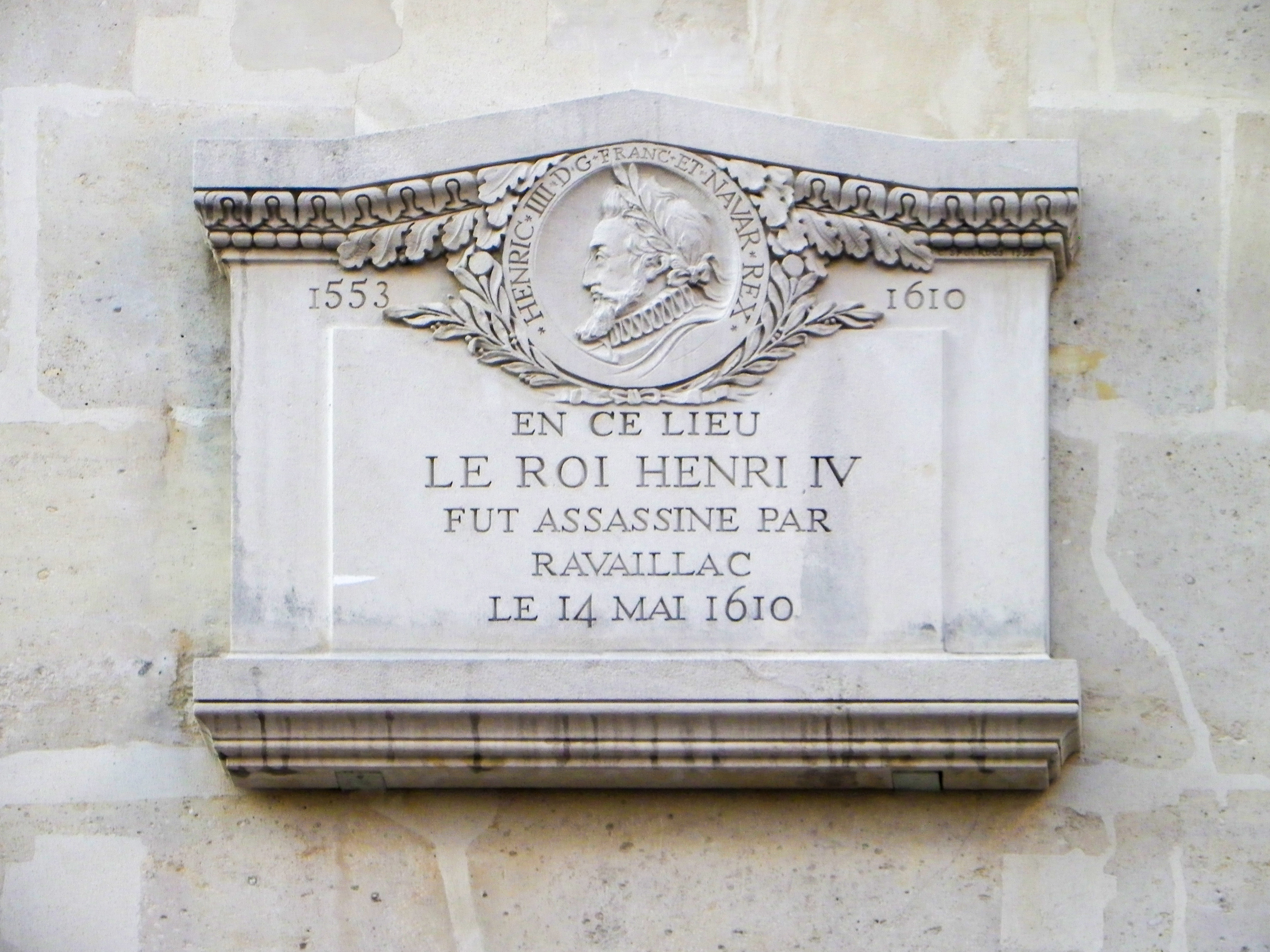
Plaque commemorating the assassination of Henry IV by Ravaillac on Rue de la Ferronnerie in Paris

When the cocher tried to drive around two carts blocking the way, he swerved sharply to the left. This maneuver caused the vehicle to tip over, with the right wheel sinking into the gutter in the middle of the road and the left wheel lifting up. At that moment, Ravaillac suddenly jumped onto the wheel and stabbed the king in the chest with a knife. Henry screamed that he had been stabbed. The attacker stabbed again, and the king fell silent, mortally wounded. A third stab was made, but it missed and grazed the sleeve of the Duke of Montbazon. The attack was so quick that none of the nobles in the carriage could clearly identify the attacker. Ravaillac, however, remained motionless at the scene of the crime and allowed himself to be arrested without resistance. Meanwhile, Épernon noticed that blood was flowing from the king's mouth and covered him with a cloak. To calm the agitated spectators, he assured them that the king was not seriously injured. The carriage then rushed directly to the Louvre. However, when they arrived there, the king was already dead.

== Execution ==
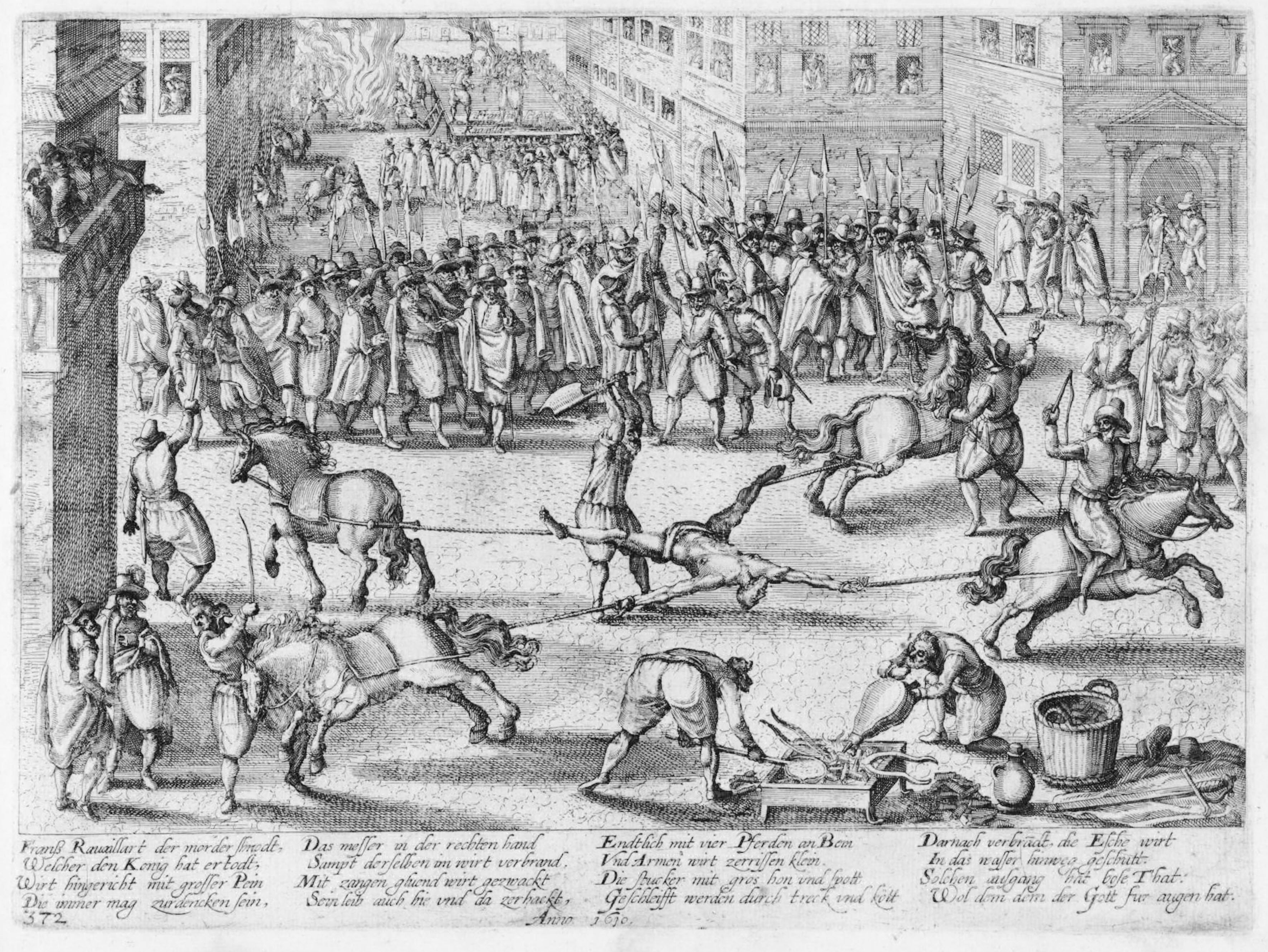
The execution of François Ravaillac

After the assassination of King Henry IV, the Paris Parliament deemed it necessary to put the murderer Ravaillac on public display. Ravaillac was tortured on May 25 and urged to tell the truth, even though he believed in his freedom and innocence. On May 27, the Paris Parliament found Ravaillac guilty of high treason against God and man, specifically for murder. He was forced to confess his crime publicly in front of the main portal of Notre Dame, where he was brought in a cart. Ravaillac was to confess that he had committed the murder and killed his ruler with two knife stabs, and ask for forgiveness from God, the king, and the law.

Ravaillac was sentenced to a cruel punishment for his crime, which included torture, being drawn and quartered by horses, burning his body, and scattering his ashes. His property was confiscated, his birthplace demolished, and rebuilding it was prohibited. His family was also severely punished: his parents were expelled from the country and threatened with the death penalty if they returned; his relatives were forbidden to bear the name Ravaillac. The court wanted to hold his entire family responsible for his actions. After the verdict was announced, Ravaillac was tortured again to find out the names of possible accomplices. However, he insisted that he had acted alone. Ravaillac was brought, bound hand and foot, to a chapel, where he confessed to two Scholars from the Sorbonne that no one had influenced or supported him. This statement remained unchanged even in the presence of the Parliament's clerk. At 3:00 p.m., he was led from the chapel to the prison gates, where other prisoners and onlookers mocked him. The loud cries drowned out the public reading of his death sentence.

Before Ravaillac went up to the scaffold, he was asked to confess the whole truth, but he repeated that he had nothing more to say. Then he asked the king, the queen, “and everyone else” for forgiveness. On the scaffold, he was cruelly tortured: the arm with which he had committed the murder was dipped in burning sulfur, his flesh was torn out with red-hot tongs, and molten lead, boiling oil, resin, wax, and sulfur were poured into the wounds. Ravaillac asked to recite the Salve Regina, a prayer to the Virgin Mary, but the crowd shouted that he did not deserve it because his soul was damned. The clerk urged Ravaillac several times to name his accomplices, but he insisted that he had acted alone.

The first part of his torture lasted one to two hours and was deliberately prolonged. In the second phase, his arms and legs were tied to four horses pulling in opposite directions. The angry crowd pulled on the ropes to help the horses. When one of the horses got tired, a spectator replaced it with his own, which broke Ravaillac's thigh bone with a powerful jerk. After an hour and a half of this agonizing ordeal, Ravaillac finally died. His body was then torn to pieces. The angry crowd attacked the remains with swords, knives, sticks, and whatever else was at hand, beating, hacking, and dragging them through the streets. Some burned the body parts, scattered the ashes, or trampled them underfoot.

== Aftermath ==
=== Conspiracies ===
Following Ravaillac's execution, rumors began to circulate that Henry IV's assassination was the result of a conspiracy. There were many people who wanted to get rid of the king and were prepared to take whatever measures necessary to achieve this. In addition, there were even more people who would have welcomed his death, even if they were not prepared to actively participate in it. The former included Henriette d'Entragues and her father, the Duke of Auvergne and the Duke of Bouillon, the Duke of Épernon and his mistress Madame du Tillet, Concini, whom Marie de' Medici had brought with her from Italy before her marriage to the king, and the Jesuits. Épernon in particular was identified as the main suspect. He had known Ravaillac for some time and his antipathy towards Henry was well known. If he had been looking for an assassin for the king, he would most likely have found a suitable man in Ravaillac. Moreover, Ravaillac had made no secret of his intentions.

Some eyewitnesses to the murder noted that Épernon made no attempt to protect the king from further violence after the initial attack, even though he could easily have done so. Épernon also managed to bring Ravaillac to his own house while he was still at the Hôtel de Retz, where he remained for the entire day. No one knows what went on behind closed doors during this time, but many people believed that if Ravaillac had remained at the Retz, he might have been forced or persuaded to tell the truth. Ultimately, this would not have made any difference to his final fate, as he was going to be executed anyway. This may have been pure speculation, but there was some evidence to support it, albeit only indirect. After all, Épernon threatened to stab one of the judges investigating the crime if he did not promise not to investigate the role that Épernon or the queen had played in the matter. Even the queen was under suspicion. Unlike Épernon, she was not accused of being directly involved in a conspiracy, but rather of knowing about it and turning a blind eye. In the last years of her marriage, she had been afraid of her husband because he had threatened to send her back to Italy, and she even thought he might kill her.

Although there was no concrete evidence that Bouillon or Auvergne were involved in a plot to assassinate the king, both had been involved in the conspiracies of Biron and Entragues. They might have attempted another assassination if they had been certain of success. Furthermore, there was another aspect of the case that led many people to believe that there may have been another conspiracy whose goal was to prevent a thorough investigation of the murder. The entire nation would have been plunged into chaos if it had turned out that the Jesuits, the former leaders of the League, or one of the groups that had previously conspired against the monarch, such as Auvergne, Entragues, or Bouillon, were responsible. The king's assassination would also have benefited Concini, Marie de' Medici's right-hand man, as he had considerable influence over her after she became regent. After Henry's death, the queen granted him a generous allowance and appointed Concini as Marquis d'Ancre and governor of Peronne, Roye, and Montdidier.

In 2009 French historian Jean-Christian Petitfils, hypothesized that Henry IV's assassination was orchestrated by Albert of Austria, the ruler of the Spanish Netherlands. After learning of the facts, the Spanish monarchs attempted to conceal them out of concern that they would be linked to his purported self-initiated actions. Petitfils does not support the theory that the Duke of Épernon conspired against the king, as his actions shortly after the king's assassination would contradict this view. In fact, he protected Ravaillac from being killed by the guards and the population, a decision that would have prevented the possible exposure of accomplices.

Instead he focused on the love affair between Henry IV and Charlotte-Marguerite de Montmorency, which had been known since 1609. The King of France fell in love with the 15-year-old during a rehearsal for a show, and he convinced his nephew, Henry II of Bourbon-Condé, to marry her. However, Henri de Condé, feeling his honor had been compromised, fled with his wife and took refuge in Brussels with Albert of Austria. Henri IV demanded the return of his nephew and wife, and a military expedition was prepared as part of the War of Succession. Albert of Austria, outraged by Henry IV's behavior, sent a team of assassins to Paris to end the reign of the King of France.

According to Jean-Christian Petitfils, the party of men in Rue de la Ferronnerie who tried to execute Ravaillac but were stopped by Baron de Courtomer were the "commando" that Albert of Austria had dispatched to Paris. They would have supported the future regicide in his plans to assassinate the King of France because they had met him a few days prior (Ravaillac and this group went to the same church when Ravaillac was in Paris). They would have wanted to stop him from speaking, having been preempted by him.

=== Political consequences ===
The death of Henry IV immediately led to a power vacuum. His son and successor, Louis XIII, was only nine years old at the time, so a regency was established under the leadership of his mother, Marie de' Medici. This weakened the central royal authority and led to a destabilization of the political situation in France. Maria de' Medici, who pursued a strongly pro-Catholic course, was unable to exert the same integrative power as Henry IV, who had established religious peace between Catholics and Protestants with the Edict of Nantes in 1598. Tensions between the religious groups increased again after his death, as the Huguenots increasingly saw their rights threatened.

The assassination of Henry IV had also long-term consequences for French domestic and foreign policy. His death marked the end of the reforms he had sought to implement and his attempt to strengthen the power of the monarchy without completely undermining the rights of the estates. Under Marie de' Medici and later Louis XIII, there was instead an increasing concentration of power in the crown, which was reinforced under Cardinal Richelieu. This drove the development of absolutism in France, which was to reach its peak under Louis XIV. In terms of foreign policy, Henry's death meant that France initially played a less active role in European politics. Henry had forged plans for a grand European alliance to break the Habsburgs' hegemony in Europe. These plans were abandoned after his death, which initially gave the Habsburg powers more room for maneuver.

== Bibliography ==
- Mousnier, Roland (1973). The assassination of Henry IV; the tyrannicide problem and the consolidation of the French absolute monarchy in the early seventeenth century. London: Faber and Faber. ISBN 0571093507.
- James, Alan (2000). The origins of French absolutism, 1598-1661. New York: Pearson Longman. ISBN 0582369002.
- Mousnier, R.; et al. (The New Cambridge Modern History) (1971). "French Institutions and Society 1610-61". The Decline of Spain and the Thirty Years War 1609-48/59. Vol. IV. London: Cambridge University Press. ISBN 0-521-07618-8.
- Bloundelle-Burton, John Edward (2011). The fate of Henry of Navarre; a true account of how he was slain, with a description of the Paris of the time and some of the leading personages. Nabu Press. ISBN 978-1-178-63748-9.
- Gersal, Frederick (2006). Les Grandes Enigmes de l'Histoire. Paris: Editions France Loisirs. ISBN 978-2-298-00385-7.
- Buisseret, David (1984). Henry IV. London: G. Allen & Unwin. ISBN 0044456352.
- Edward Russell, Baron of Liverpool (1969). Henry of Navarre: Henry IV of France. London: Hale. OCLC 1413385863.
- Petitfils, Jean-Christian (2009). L'assassinat d'Henri IV : mystères d'un crime. Paris: Perrin. ISBN 978-2-262-02987-6.
