= Quartier Notre-Dame =

Coordinates: 48.8529371°N 2.3500501°E

Notre-Dame
- Quartier Notre-Dame
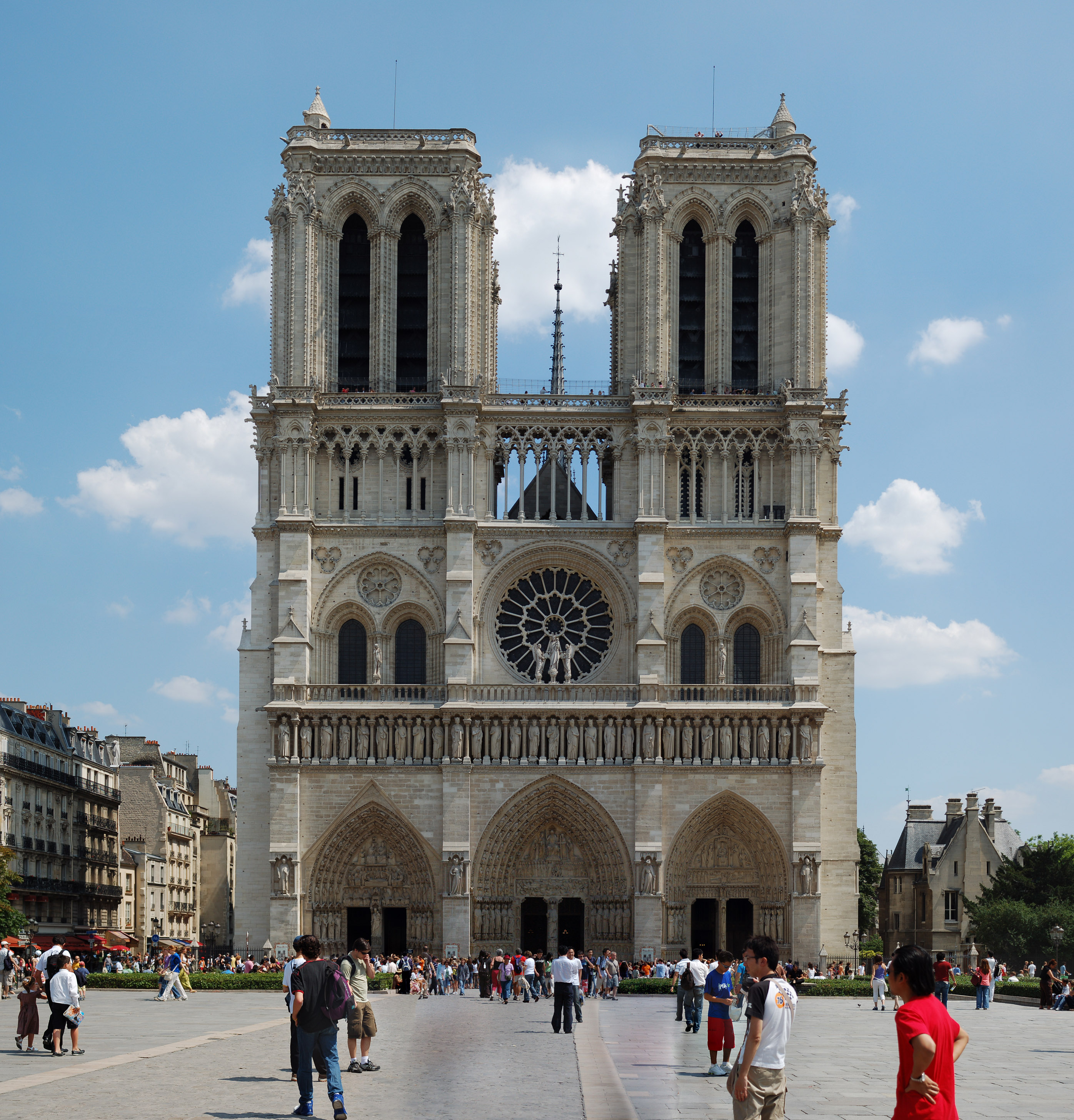
- Notre-Dame de Paris
- Interactive map of Notre-Dame
- Country: France
- Region: Île-de-France
- Ville: Paris
- Arrondissement: 4th

Area
  - Total: 0.379 km^{2} (0.146 sq mi)

Population (2016)
  - Total: 3,029
  - Density: 7,992/km^{2} (20,700/sq mi)

The Quartier Notre-Dame is the 16th administrative district of Paris, located in the 4th arrondissement. It comprises the Île Saint-Louis and the part of the Île de la Cité situated east of the Boulevard du Palais.

It takes its name from the Notre-Dame de Paris cathedral.

Administrative location of the quartier within the current 4th arrondissement.

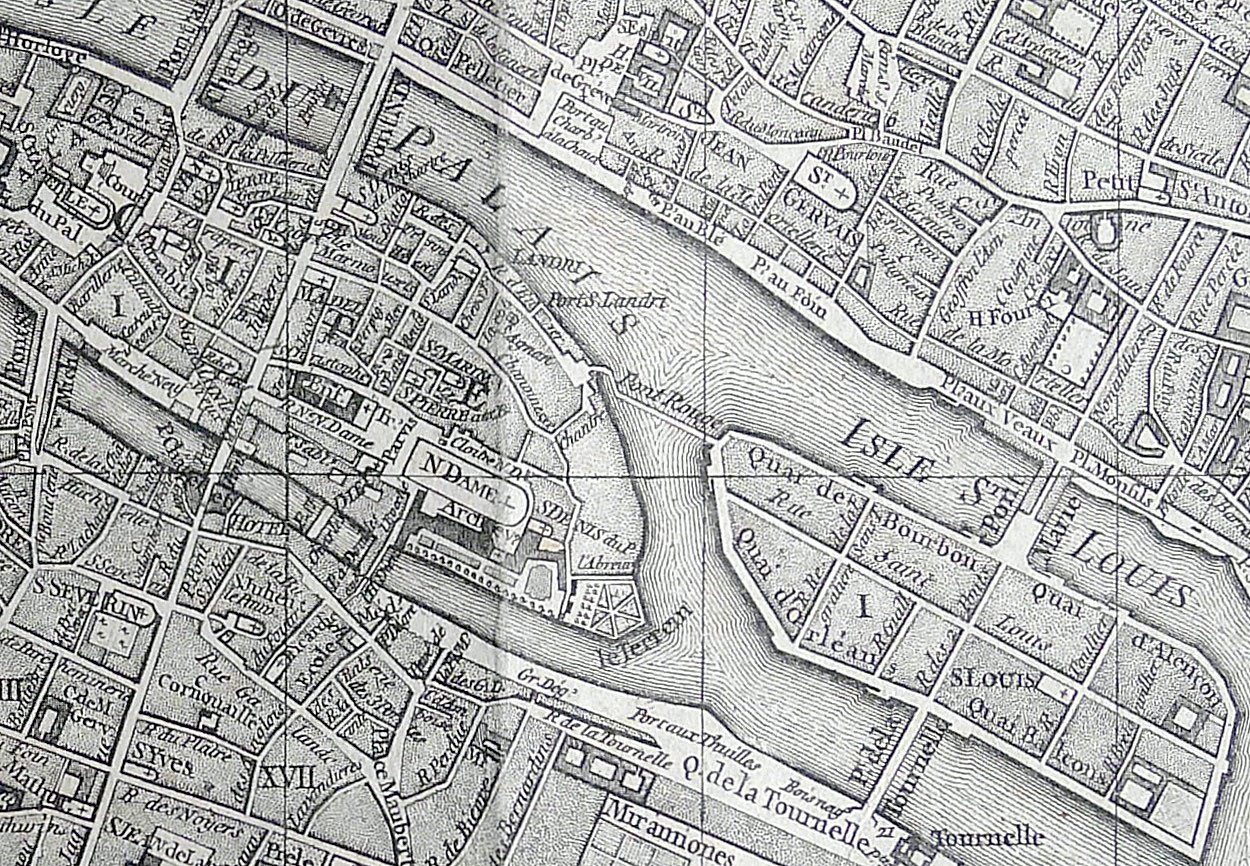
Notre-Dame district on the Vaugondy map (1760).

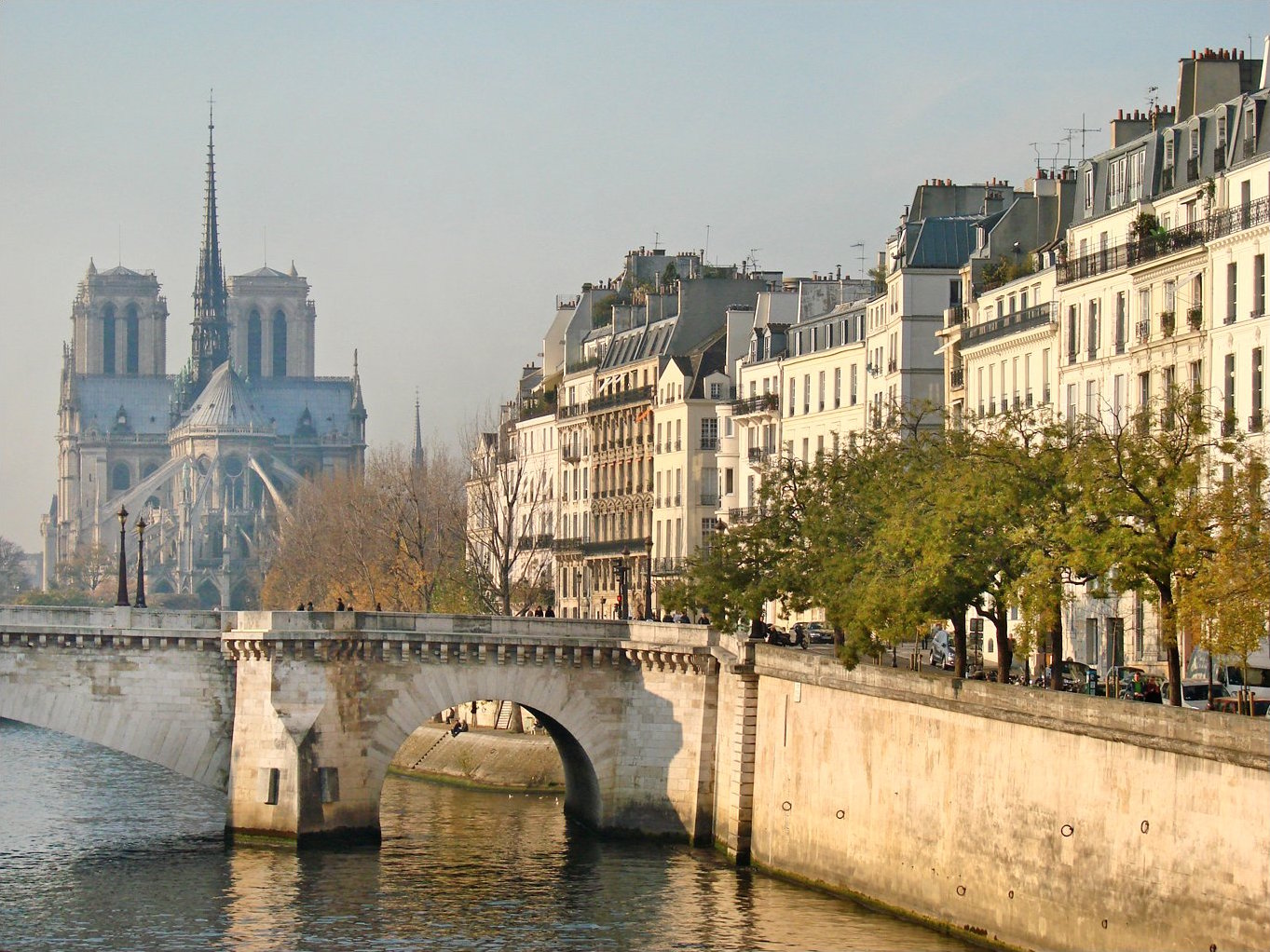
Quai de Béthune, Pont de la Tournelle, Quai d'Orléans, and Notre-Dame Cathedral in Paris.

== Significant locations ==
In addition to the Paris cathedral, the neighborhood is punctuated by the Hôtel-Dieu, the church of Saint-Louis-en-l'Île, the Marché aux fleurs Reine-Elizabeth-II, private mansions, quays, and bridges.

== Bibliography ==
- Janusz Deryng and André Gutton (1904–2002), Institut d'urbanisme de Paris, L'entourage de Notre-Dame de Paris , Paris, s.n., 1951, 150 p., 28 cm (OCLC 489595011, SUDOC 003205479, présentation en ligne [archive]).
- Félix-Edmond Fabre (1895-1973), Septième promenade-conférence dans le Paris de Huysmans : Huysmans et le quartier notre-Dame, Paris, Société J. K. Huysmans (1848-1907), s.d., 12 p., 28 cm (BNF 39168807).
- Joris-Karl Huysmans (1848-1907) (ill. Charles Jouas (1866-1942)), Le quartier Notre-Dame, Paris, A. Romagnol (1865-1918), coll. « Académie Goncourt », 1905, 37 p., 22 cm (OCLC 490426946, BNF 39168807, SUDOC 023364084).
