= Didier Robert de Vaugondy =

French geographer (1723–1786)

- Born: 1723; Paris, France
- Died: 1786 (aged 62–63)
- Notable work: L'Europe : divisée en ses états, empires, royaumes et républiques
- Scientific career
- Fields: geography

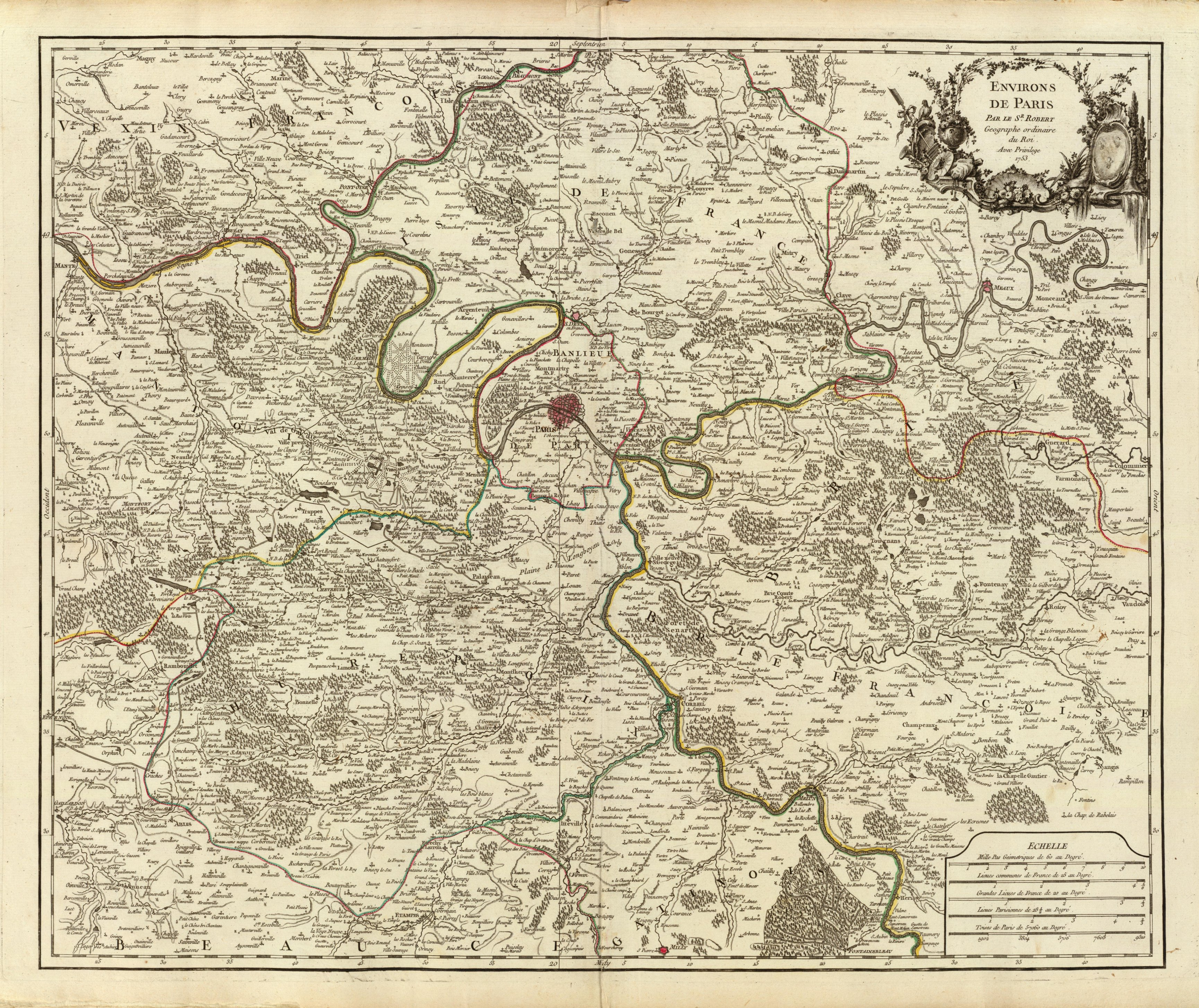
Map Environs de Paris ("Surroundings of Paris"), from the first edition of the Atlas Universel, Paris 1757.

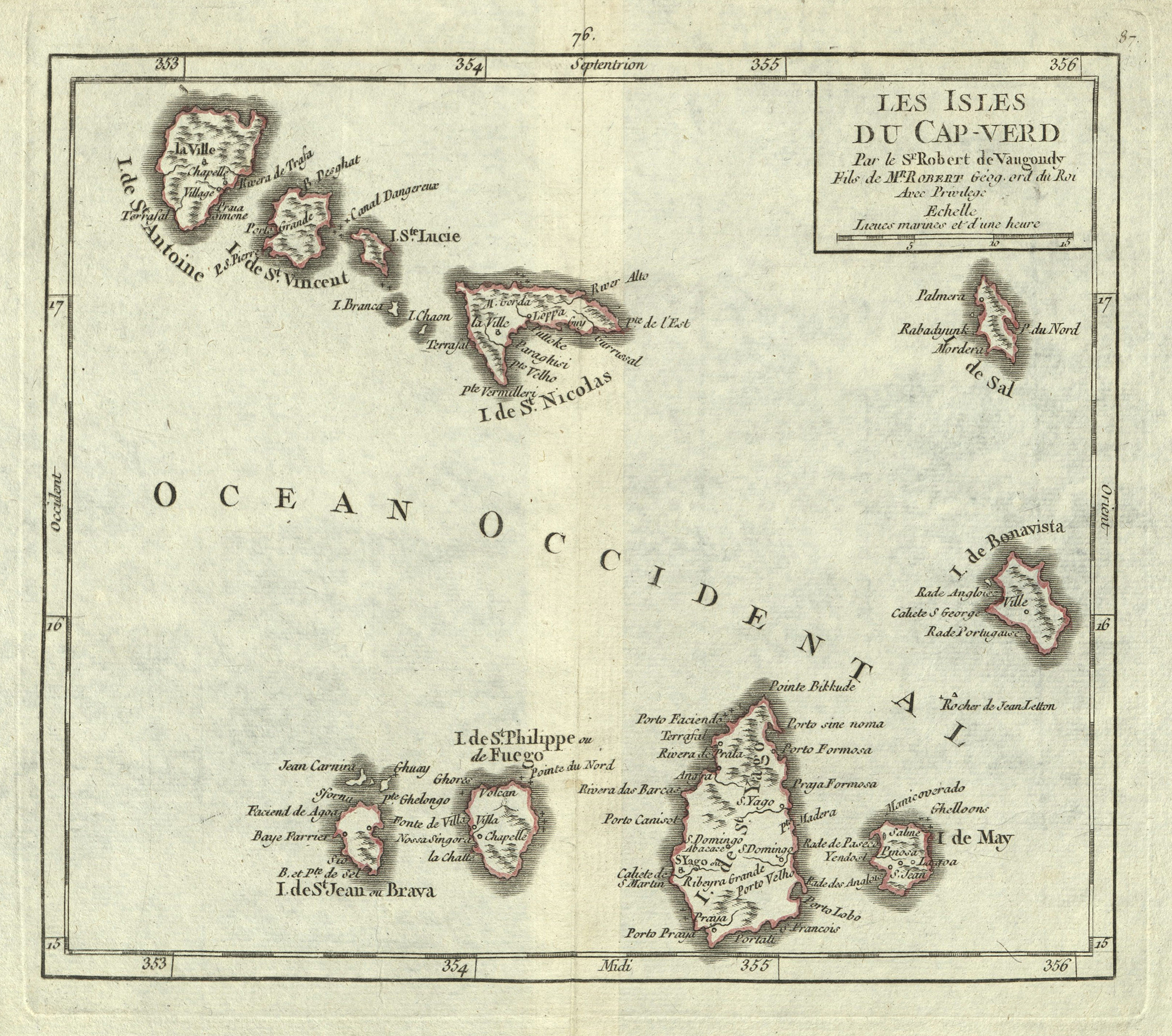
Map Les Isles du Cap-Verd, 1749

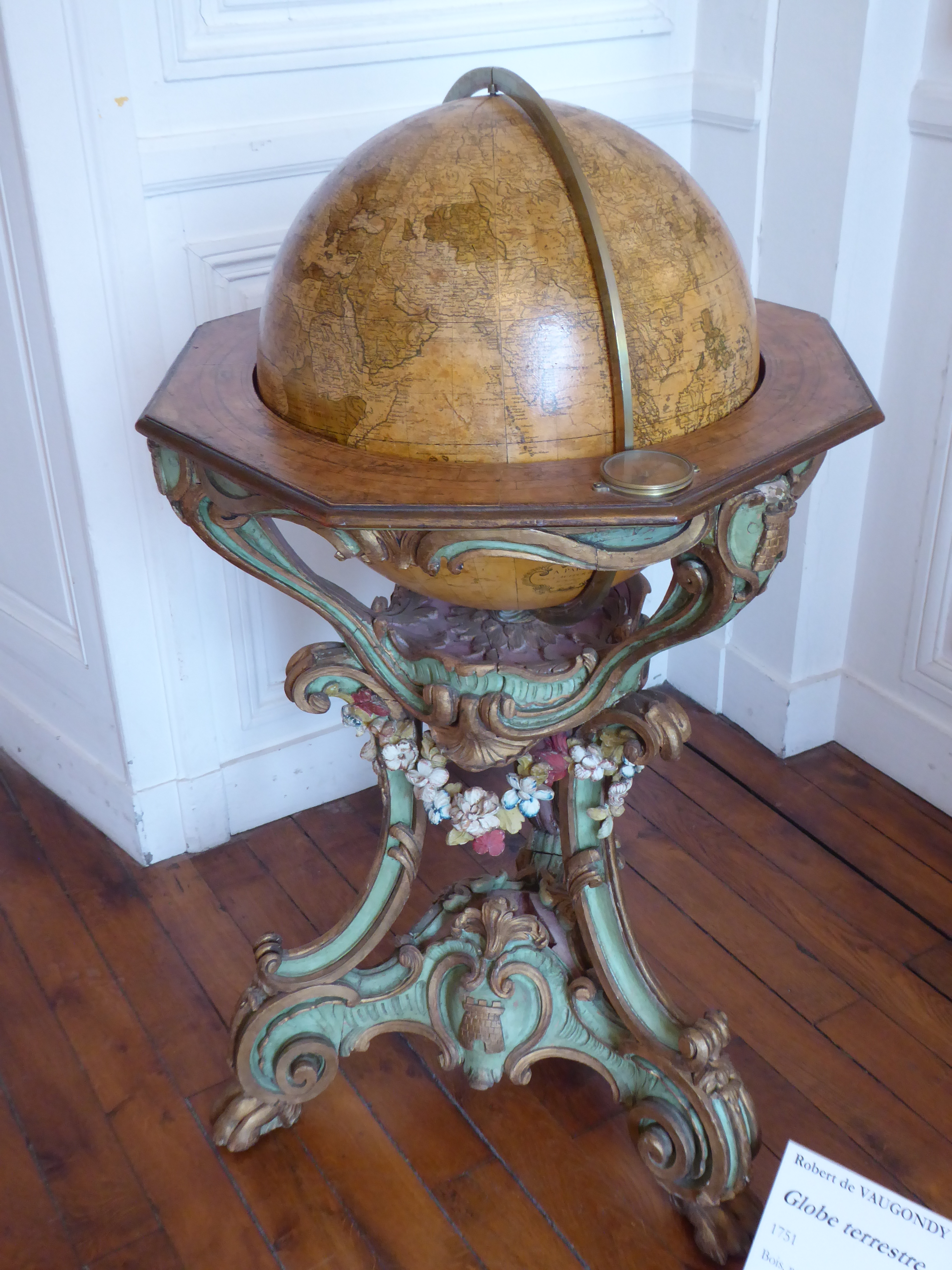
Madame de Pompadour's globe (1751), fr:musée des Beaux-Arts de Chartres.

Didier Robert de Vaugondy (1723, Paris – 1786) was an 18th-century French geographer.

The son of Robert de Vaugondy, he was appointed geographer of the King by Louis XV, geographer of the Duke of Lorraine by Stanisław Leszczyński, King of Poland, Grand Duke of Lithuania, Duke of Lorraine. In 1773, he became royal censor for works related to geography, navigation and travels.

== Works ==
- L'Europe : divisée en ses états, empires, royaumes et républiques. Delamache, Paris 1767
- Collaboration to the Encyclopédie, Vol 7: Foang – Gythium, Paris 1757.
  - Article Fuseau (Geog.), (p. 385)
  - Article Géographie, (p. 608–613)
  - Article Globe (Astronom. & Géogr.), (p. 707–711)

== See also ==
- Sea of the West

== Bibliography ==
- Jean-François Gauvin: Traditionen des Globenbaus um 1750: die Valks, Didier Robert de Vaugondy und Åkerman im Vergleich, in: der Globusfreund: wissenschaftliche Zeitschrift für Globen- und Instrumentenkunde 51–52 (2003–2004), (ISSN 0436-0664), (p. 47–48)
- Mary Sponberg Pedley: Bel et utile: the work of Robert de Vaugondy family of mapmakers, Tring, Herts, England 1992, (ISBN 0-906430-12-7).
- Robert de Vaugondy, Didier, in: Frank Arthur Kafker, The encyclopedists as individuals: a biographical dictionary of the authors of the Encyclopédie, Oxford 1988, (ISBN 0-7294-0368-8, (p. 330–333).
- Mary Sponberg Pedley: The Map Trade in Paris, 1650–1825, in: Imago Mundi: the international journal for the history of cartography 33 (1981), (ISSN 1479-7801), (p. 33–45)
- Edward Dahl, Jean-Francois Gauvin, Sphaerae Mundi: Early Globes at the Stewart Museum, Montreal, Éditions du Septentrion et McGill-Queen's University Press, 2000, 280 p. (ISBN 9780773569072(. Voir « Globes by Didier Robert de Vaugondy », (p. 167 and fol.)

== Sources ==
- Ferdinand Hoefer, Nouvelle Biographie générale, vol.37, Paris, Firmin-Didot, 1824, p. 23-4.
- Pierre Larousse, Grand Dictionnaire universel du XIXe, vol.13, Paris, Administration du grand Dictionnaire universel, p. 663.
