= Quartier de l'Arsenal =

Administrative quarter of Paris, France

Coordinates: 48.8556308°N 2.3655346°E

Arsenal
- Quartier de l'Arsenal
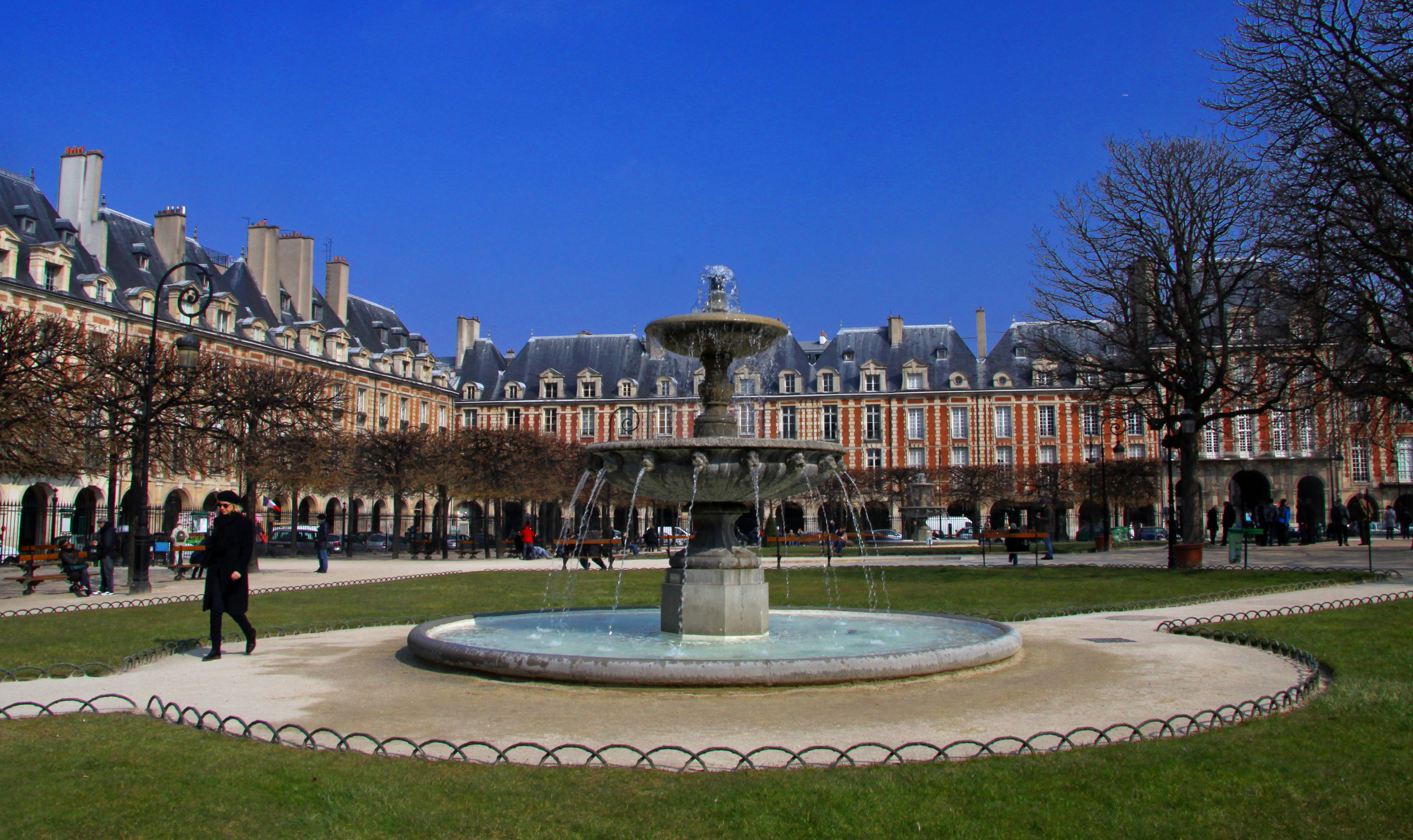
- Place des Vosges
- Country: France
- Region: Île-de-France
- Commune: Paris
- Arrondissement: 4th

Area
  - Total: 0.487 km^{2} (0.188 sq mi)

Population (2016)
  - Total: 8,718
  - Density: 17,900/km^{2} (46,400/sq mi)

The Quartier de l'Arsenal is the 15th of the 80 administrative quarters of Paris. It occupies the eastern part of the 4th arrondissement.

== Geography ==
In a narrow sense, the Arsenal area is the triangle formed by the Quai Henri-IV along the Seine, the Bassin de l'Arsenal and the Boulevard Henri-IV. The administrative quarter is larger. It is bounded by the Quai Henri-IV to the south; the Rue Saint-Paul and the Rue de Turenne to the west; the Rue du Pas-de-la-Mule and the Place des Vosges to the north; and the Boulevard Beaumarchais, the Place de la Bastille and the Boulevard Bourdon to the east.

== History ==
In the 14th century the area was home to the Célestins convent, close to the royal residence of the Hôtel Saint-Pol. In 1512 Louis XII had a foundry built there for casting cannon, and Henry IV later added a residence for Sully, the grand master of artillery. Under Louis XIV the Arsenal became an arms store and a centre for testing gunpowder, where Lavoisier later had his laboratory. The Arsenal closed in 1788.

In 1757 the Marquis de Paulmy d'Argenson, bailli of the artillery, installed a library in the main building, the only part of the site that survives. The library was confiscated and declared national in 1791. It became a public library in 1797 and was attached to the Bibliothèque nationale in 1934. It is now the Bibliothèque de l'Arsenal.

After the demolition of the Bastille, the Bassin de l'Arsenal was dug in place of the fortress moat and later linked to the Canal Saint-Martin, built between 1822 and 1825. In the 19th and 20th centuries it was a commercial port, mostly for wine, grain and timber. It became a pleasure-boat marina, the Port de l'Arsenal, in 1983.

The Pavillon de l'Arsenal stands on the Boulevard Morland. The hall was built in 1878–1879 to plans by the architect Clément for the timber merchant Laurent-Louis Borniche, who intended it as a "popular museum" for his paintings. The City of Paris bought it in 1954 and stored archives there. After conversion by the architects Bernard Reichen and Philippe Robert, it opened in December 1988 as a centre for information and exhibitions on the architecture and planning of Paris.

The quarter within the 4th arrondissement

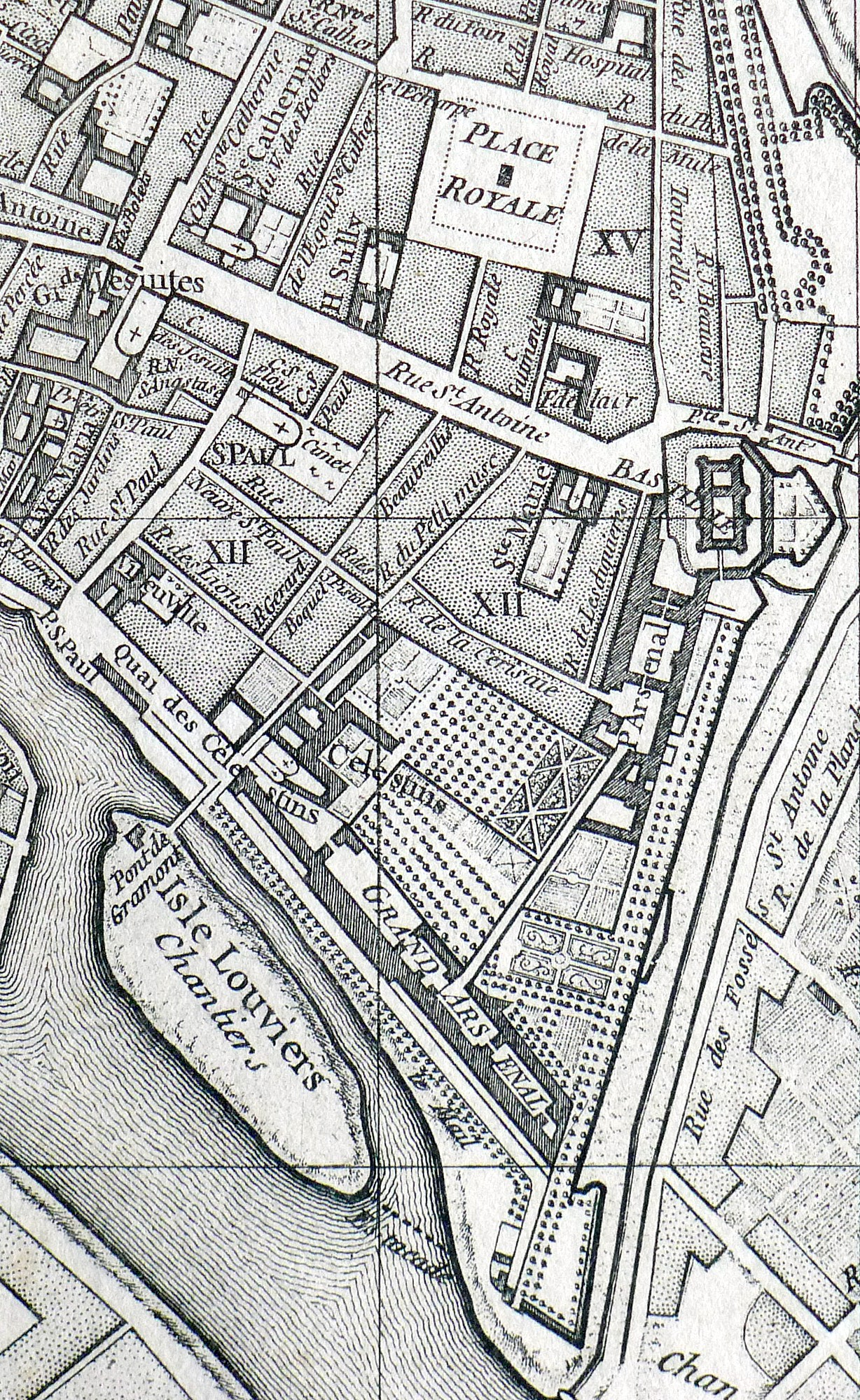
The Arsenal on the Vaugondy map of 1760

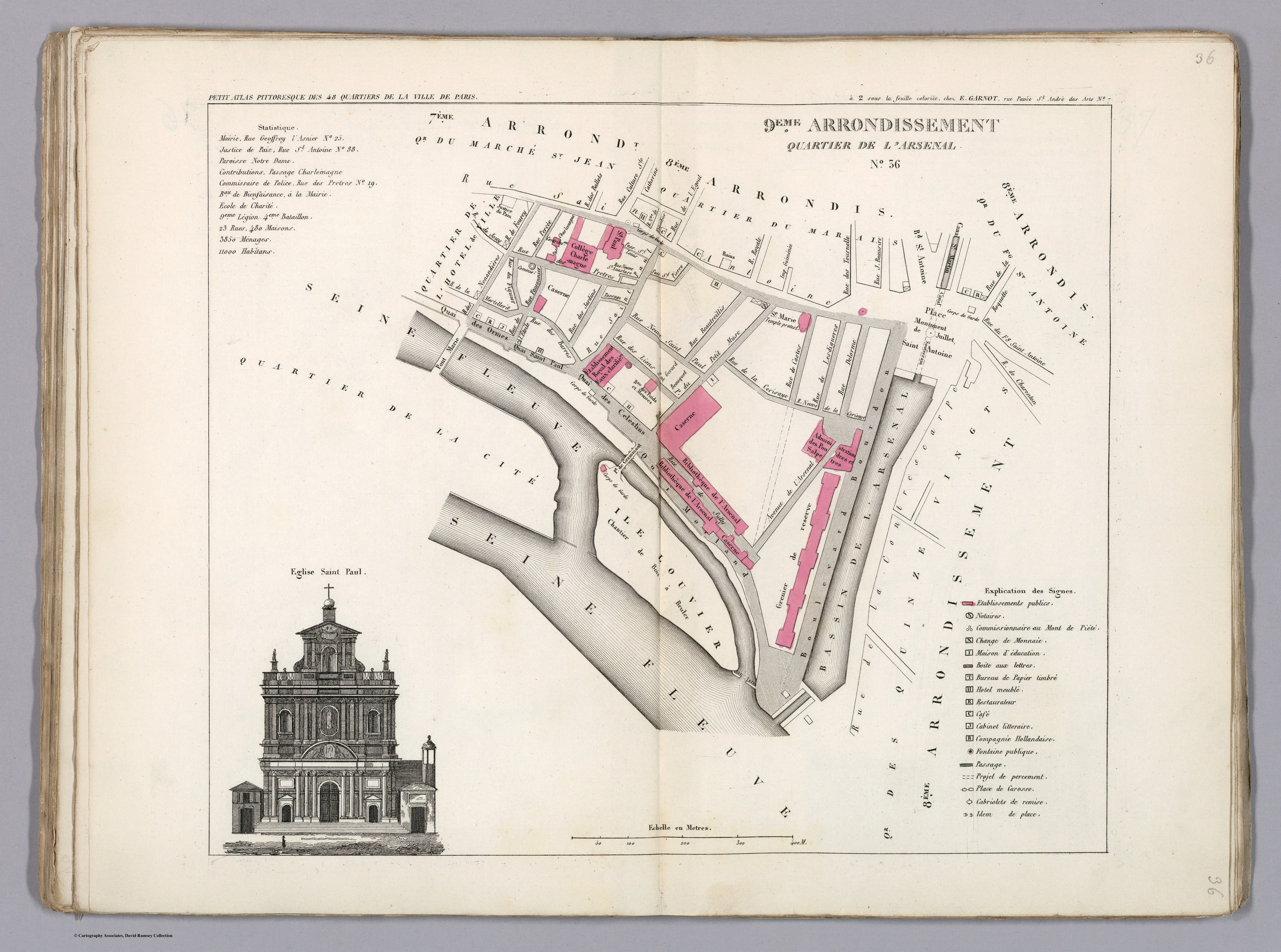
The Arsenal quarter of the former 9th arrondissement in 1834
