= Robert de Vaugondy =

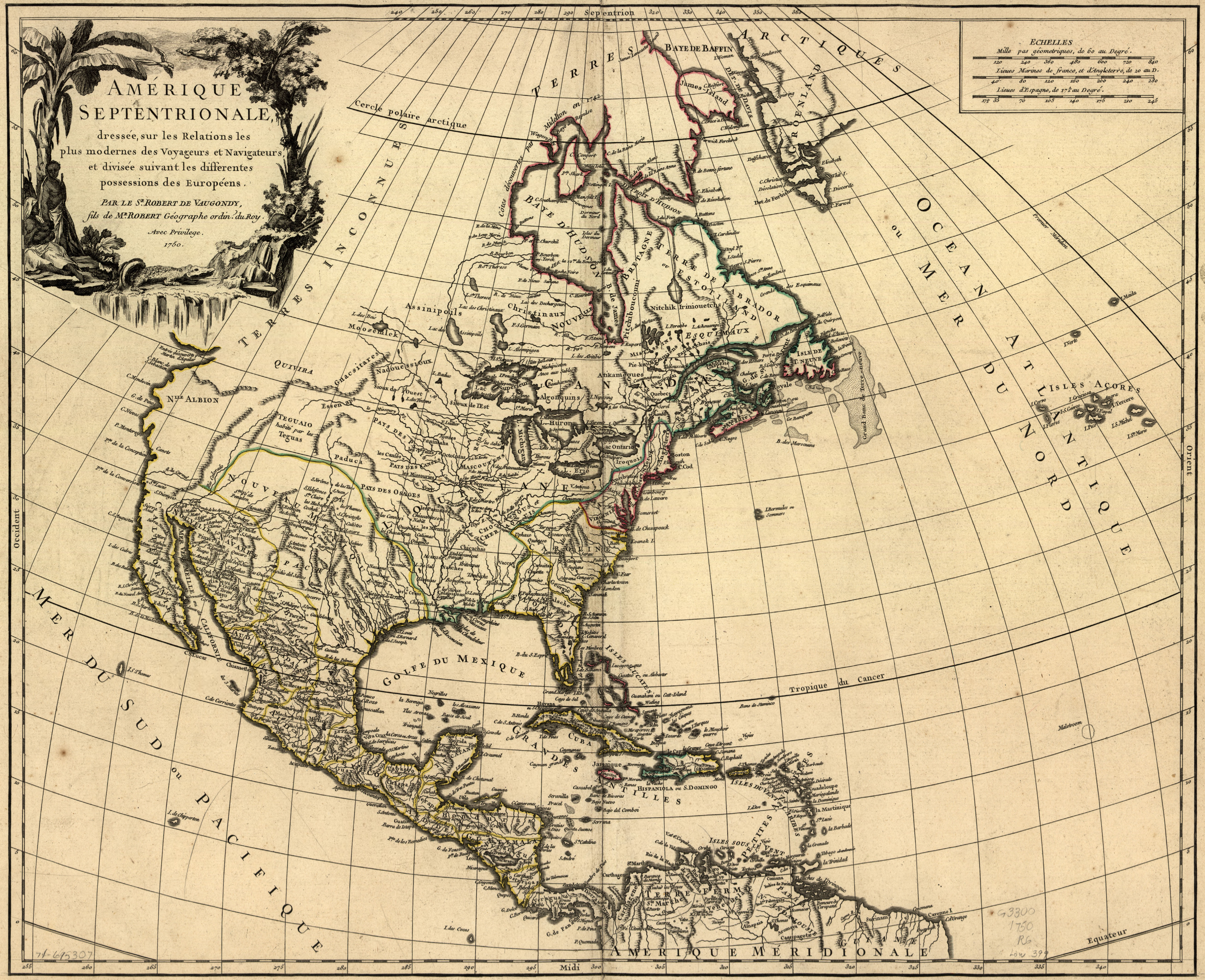
Vaugondy map of North America, 1750

Gilles Robert de Vaugondy (1688–1766), also known as Le Sieur or Monsieur Robert, and his son, Didier Robert de Vaugondy (c.1723–1786), were leading cartographers in France during the 18th century.

== Life ==
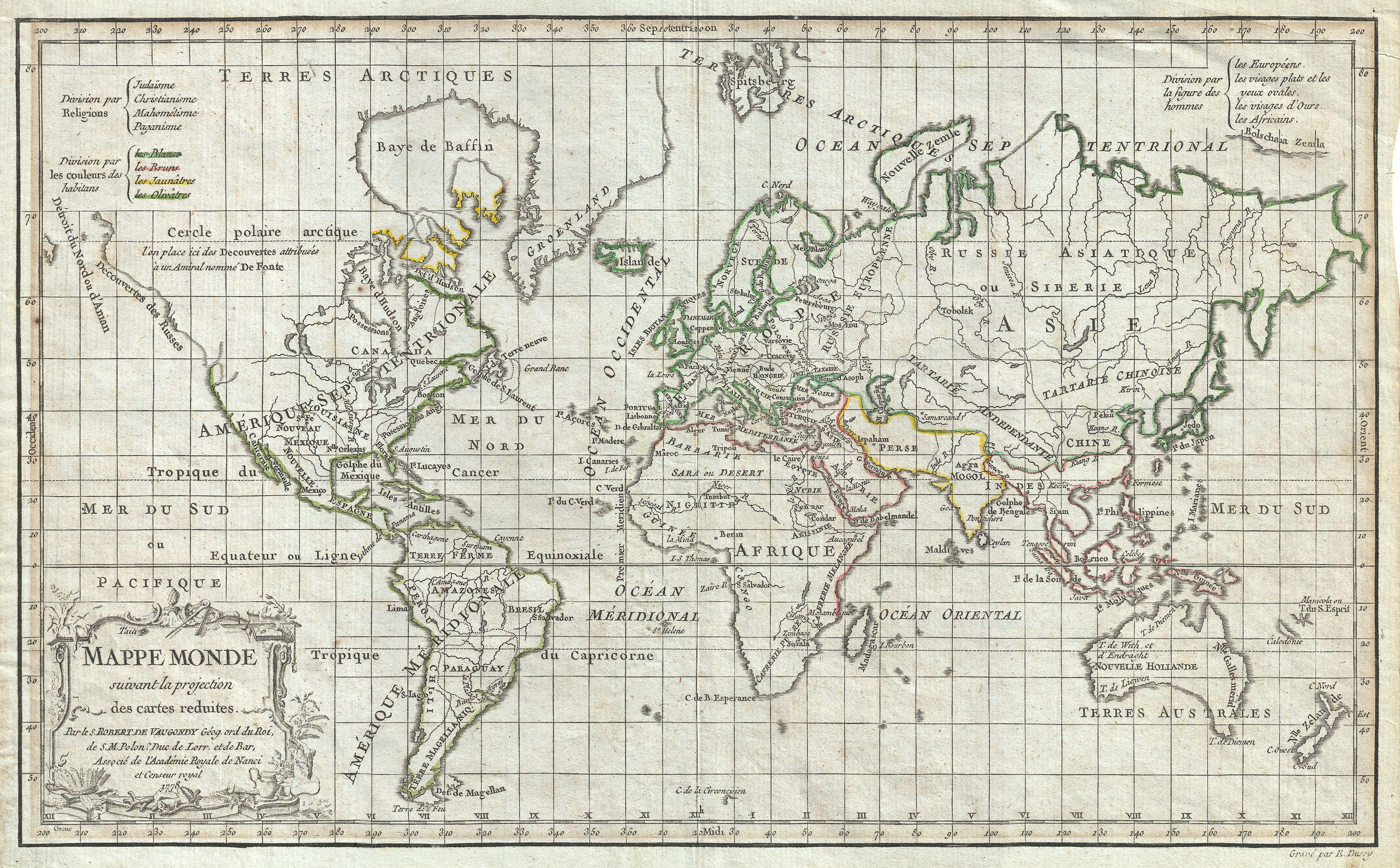
1784 map on a Mercator projection by Robert de Vaugondy: Whites/Blancs (green), Browns/Bruns (red), Yellows/Jaunâtres (yellow), Olives/Olivâtres/ (light green).

In 1757, Gilles and Didier Robert De Vaugondy published The Atlas Universel, one of the most important atlases of the 18th century. To produce the atlas, the Vaugondys integrated older sources with more modern surveyed maps. They verified and corrected the latitude and longitude of many regional maps in the atlas with astronomical observations. The older material was revised with the addition of many new place names. In 1760, Didier Robert de Vaugondy was appointed geographer to Louis XV.

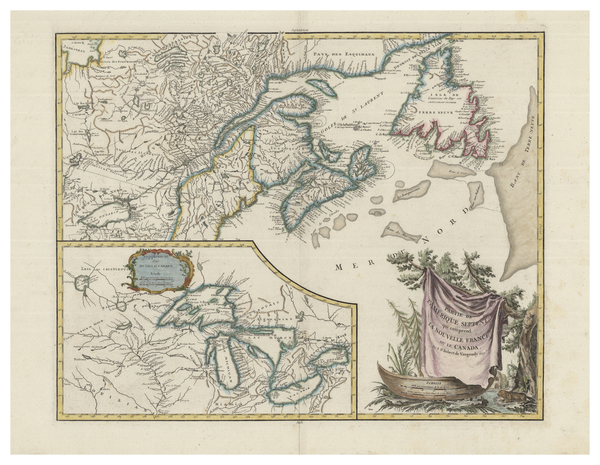
Partie de l'Amérique septent? qui comprend la Nouvelle France ou le Canada by de Vaugondy (1799)

Gilles and Didier Robert De Vaugondy produced their maps and terrestrial globes working together as father and son. Globes of a variety of sizes were made by gluing copperplate-printed gores on a plaster-finished papier-mache core, a complicated and expensive manufacturing process, employing several specialists. In some cases it is uncertain whether Gilles or Didier made a given map. Gilles often signed maps as "M.Robert", while Didier commonly signed his maps as "Robert de Vaugondy", or added "fils" or "filio" after his name.

The Robert de Vaugondys were descended from the Nicolas Sanson family through Sanson's grandson, Pierre Moulard-Sanson. From him, they inherited much of Sanson's cartographic material, which they combined with maps and plates acquired after Hubert Jaillot's death in 1712 to form the basis the Atlas Universel. Sources from the Dépôt de la Marine, the official French repository for maritime-related information, were used for their maps of Canada and South America.

Like Ortelius and Mercator, the Vaugondy's credited their sources, which has greatly benefited the study of the history of cartography during that period.
