= Quartier de la Maison-Blanche =

Coordinates: 48.8261704°N 2.350038°E

Maison-Blanche
- Quartier de la Maison-Blanche
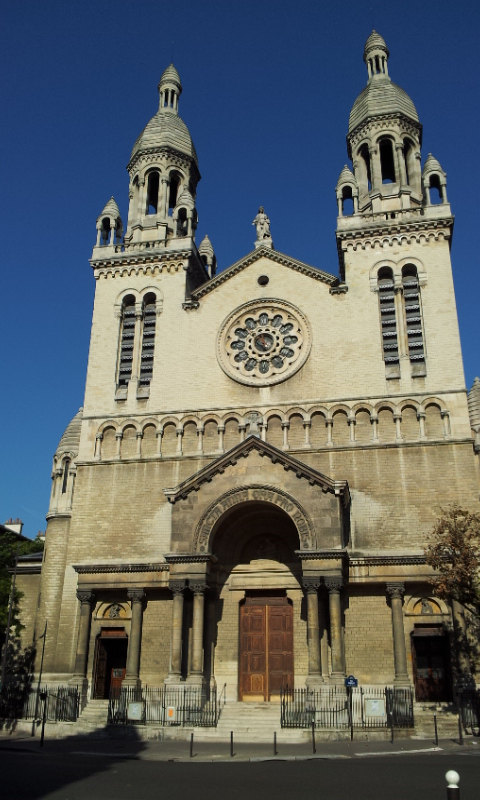
- Sainte-Anne de la Butte-aux-Cailles
- Country: France
- Region: Île-de-France
- Ville: Paris
- Arrondissement: 13th

Area
  - Total: 2.232 km^{2} (0.862 sq mi)

Population (2016)
  - Total: 67,201
  - Density: 30,108/km^{2} (77,980/sq mi)

The Quartier de la Maison-Blanche is the 51st of the 80 quarters of Paris in the 13th arrondissement.

The quarters of the 13th arrondissement

== Location ==
The administrative district in the 13th arrondissement of Paris is bordered by the following streets:

- West: Rue de l'Amiral Mouchez, Rue de la Santé
- North: Boulevard Auguste-Blanqui
- East: Avenue de Choisy, Avenue de la Porte de Choisy
- South: Beyond the Boulevard Périphérique (Rue du Val de Marne) lie the municipalities of Le Kremlin-Bicêtre and Gentilly.

== Origin of the name ==
The name of the district comes from the hamlet of Maison Blanche, which used to be located near the present-day Maison Blanche metro station.

== History ==
Until the 18th century, the Butte-aux-Cailles (French for "Hill of the Quails") to the north and the Bièvre Valley dominated the area. Two north-south roads ran through it, which later became the Avenue d'Italie and the Avenue de Choisy. At that time, the area belonged to the commune of Gentilly and was therefore outside the city walls of Paris.

In 1841, the Thiers fortifications separated the district from Gentilly, and urbanization began. At the time of its incorporation into Paris in 1860, the Bièvre Valley and the southern part were still largely undeveloped. This changed in the 19th century: the Bièvre was canalized between 1904 and 1912; as part of the urbanization of Paris, landowners were expropriated; roads were built; and industrial sites were demolished.

As part of the general urban renewal of Paris in the 20th century (French: Îlots insalubres parisiens du début du XXe siècle) and the opening of line 3 of the Paris tram (2006), the district got its current appearance.

== Sightseeing features ==
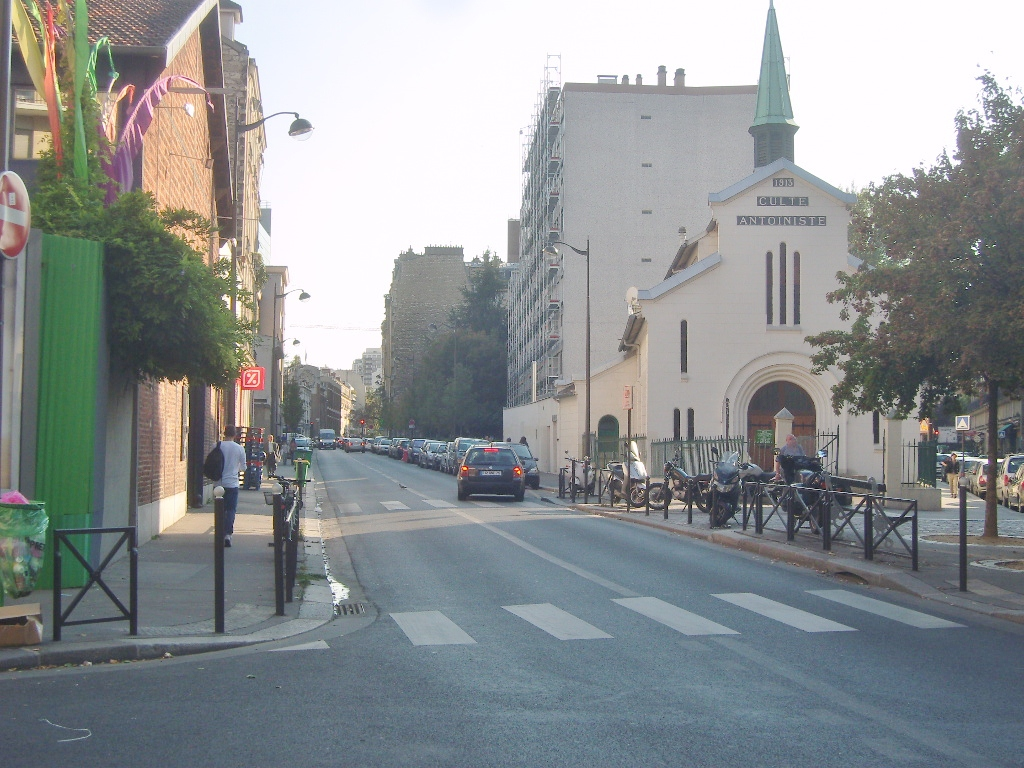
Church of the Antonists

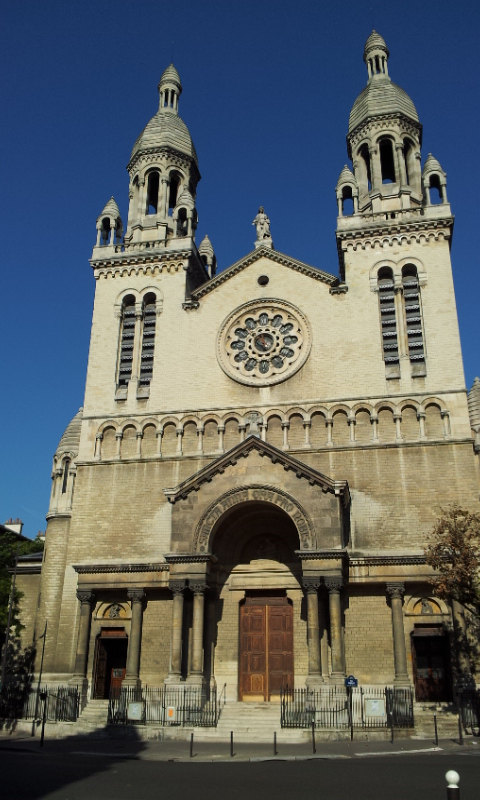
Church of Sainte-Anne de la Butte-aux-Cailles

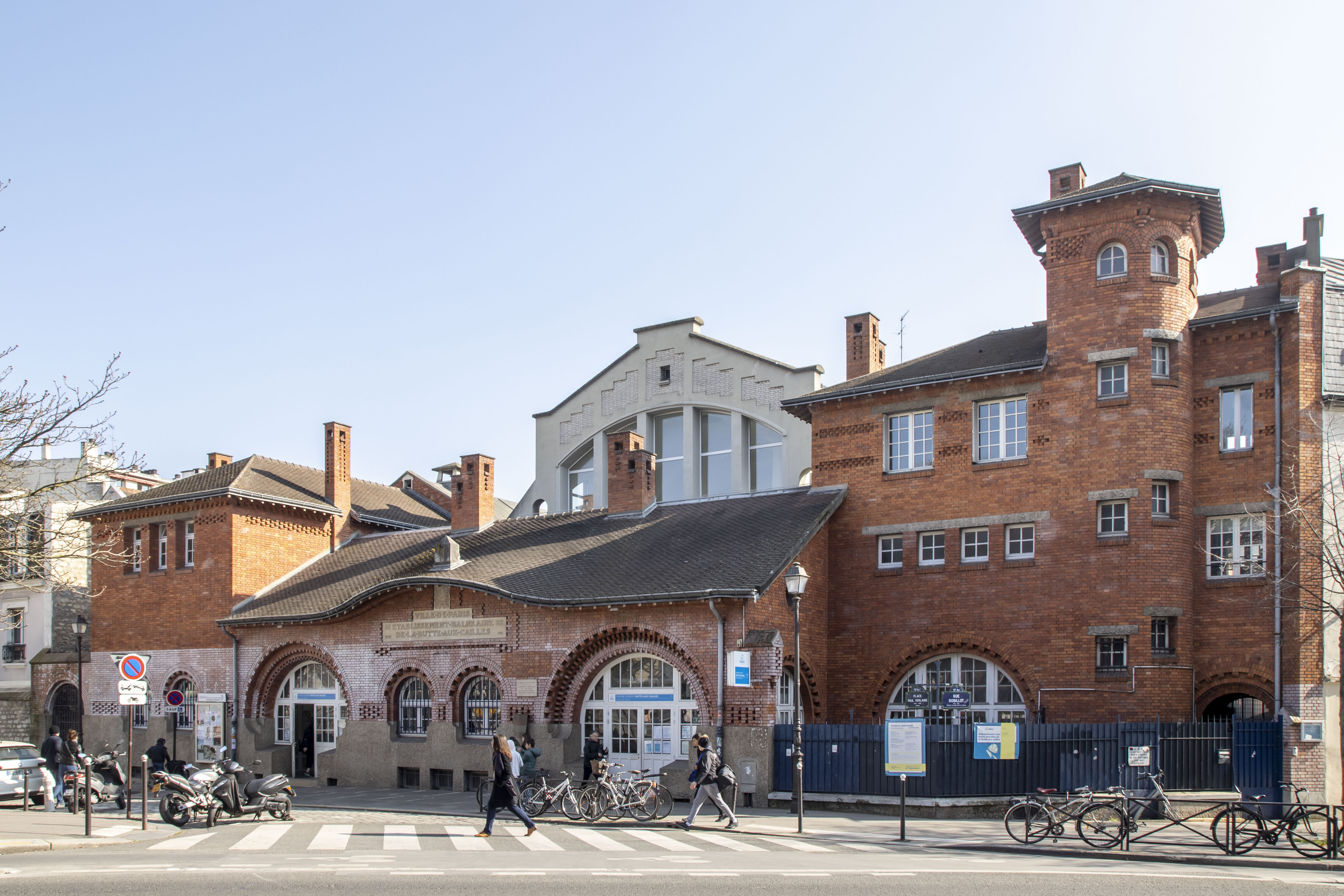
Butte-aux-Cailles swimming pool and Place Paul Verlaine
- Church of the Antonists
- Sainte-Anne de la Butte-aux-Cailles
- Butte-aux-Cailles Swimming Pool, one of the oldest swimming pools in Paris
- Peupliers Gate, a sally port of the Thiers city fortifications on Boulevard Kellermann
- Parc Kellermann, created after the demolition of the Thiers city fortifications
- Mail de Bièvre is one of the four Mailbahn avenues in Paris
- Floral City, a residential area named after and designed in the style of flowers

== Bibliography ==
- Gérard Conte, C'était hier… Le 13e arrondissement , Éditions L.M. - Le Point, 1992
- René Dubail, D'hier à aujourd'hui. Le 13e arrondissement, Les Éditions municipales, 1999
- Jean-Louis Favre, Une histoire populaire du 13e arrondissement, Paris, L'Harmattan, coll. « Logiques sociales », 2013, ISBN 978-2-343-02350-2
- Renaud Gagneux, Jean Anckaert et Gérard Conte, Sur les traces de la Bièvre parisienne, Éditions Parigramme, 2002, ISBN 978-2-84096-238-0
- Jacques Hillairet, Dictionnaire historique des rues de Paris, Éditions de Minuit, 1985
- Madeleine Leveau-Fernandez, La Zone et les Fortifs, Éditions Le Temps des Cerises, 2005, ISBN 978-2-84109-545-2
- Philippe Lucas, Mémoire des Rues. Paris XIIIe arrondissement, Éditions Parimagine, 2004
- Catherine Vialle, Je me souviens du 13e arrondissement , Éditions Parigramme, 1995
