= Sainte-Anne de la Butte-aux-Cailles =

Roman Catholic church in Paris, France

Coordinates: 48°49′34″N 2°21′00″E

Sainte-Anne de la Butte-aux-Cailles, Paris
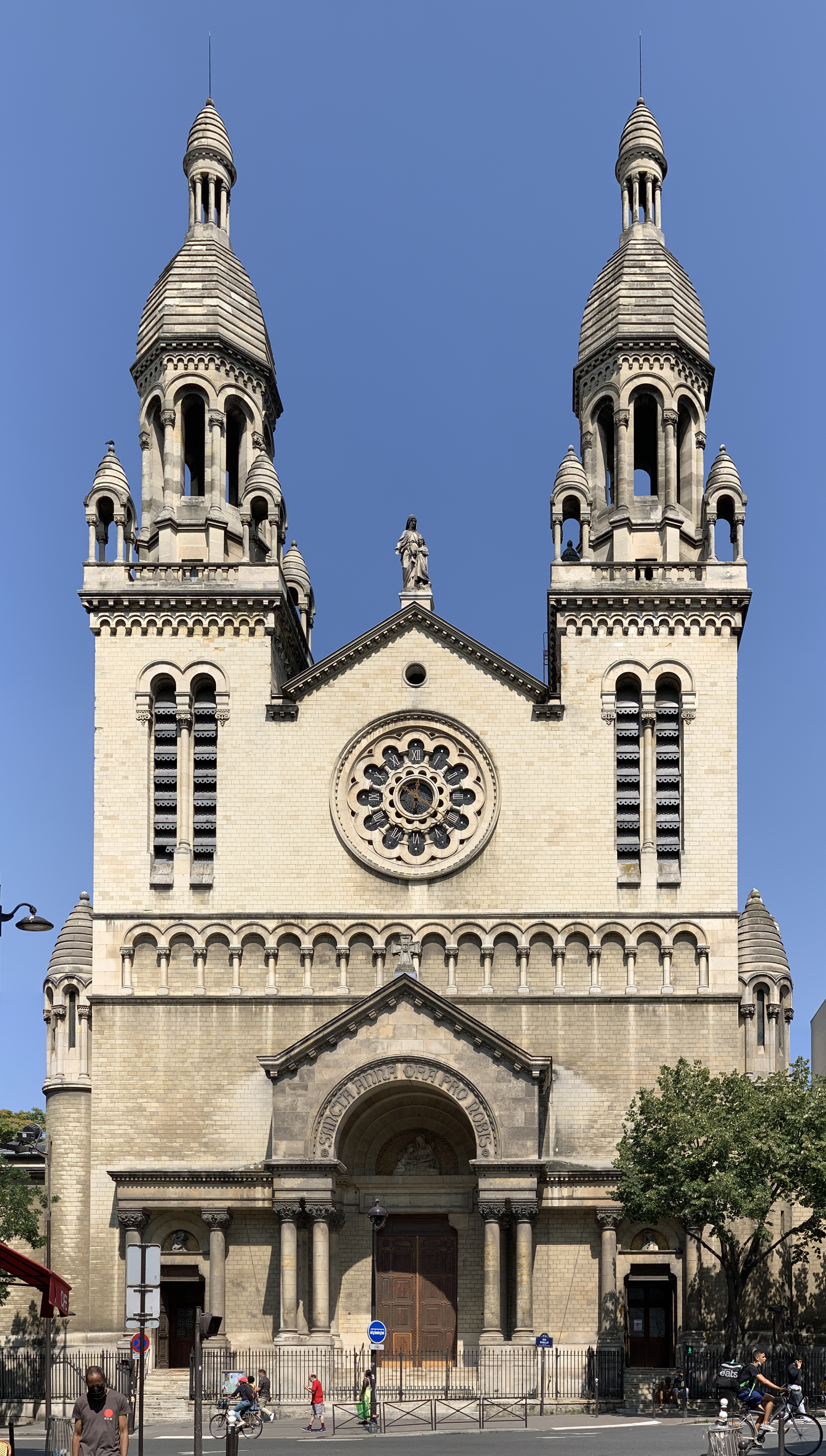
- Sainte-Anne de la Butte-aux-Cailles

Religion
- Affiliation: Catholic Church
- Province: Archdiocese of Paris
- Rite: Roman Rite

Location
- Location: 188 Rue Tolbiac 13th arrondissement of Paris
- Interactive map of Sainte-Anne de la Butte-aux-Cailles, Paris

Architecture
- Style: Neo-Roman, Neo-Byzantine
- Groundbreaking: 1894
- Completed: 1912

Sainte-Anne de la Butte-aux-Cailles is a Roman Catholic church located in the [Butte aux Cailles quarter of the 13th arrondissement of Paris, at 188 Rue Tolbiac. It was built between 1894 and 1912. It is noted for its Art Deco stained glass windows, added in 1938.

== History ==
The church takes its name from a large plot of land purchased in 1543 by a wealthy nobleman Pierre Cailles, who began to develop it. In 1662 the French prime minister Colbert chose the butte as the location the tapestry and dye industry, and for the first Gobelin factory, bringing in a large number of workers, particularly Bretons. The altar of the church today is decorated with Breton symbols. By the late 19th century the local church was overcrowded, and a new church was commissioned. The architect chosen was Prosper Bobin.

The new church was built between 1894 and 1912, in a blend of the Neo-Roman and Neo-Byzantine architectural style popular in the period, It was first called Sainte-Anne de la Maison blanche. It was partly finished by the opening of the Paris Universal Exposition of 1900.

In 1905, The unfinished church, like the French cathedrals became the property of the French government, The church took its present name, after the neighbourhood, It was finally completed and consecrated in 1912.

In 1938 new stained glass windows in the Art Deco style from the workshop of Maumejean were put into place.

In 2018 the church was listed as an historical monument of France.

== Exterior ==
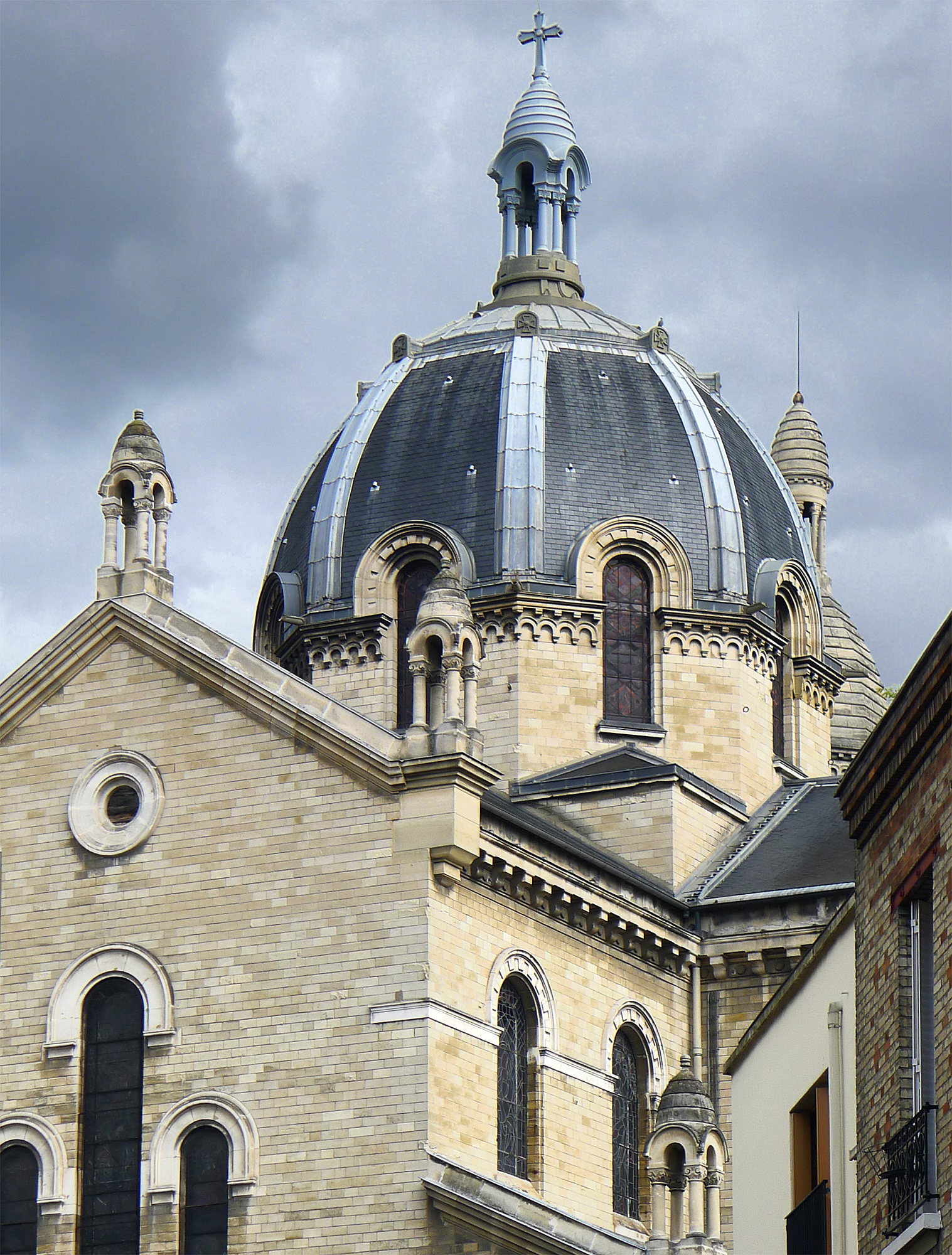
Cupola over the transept

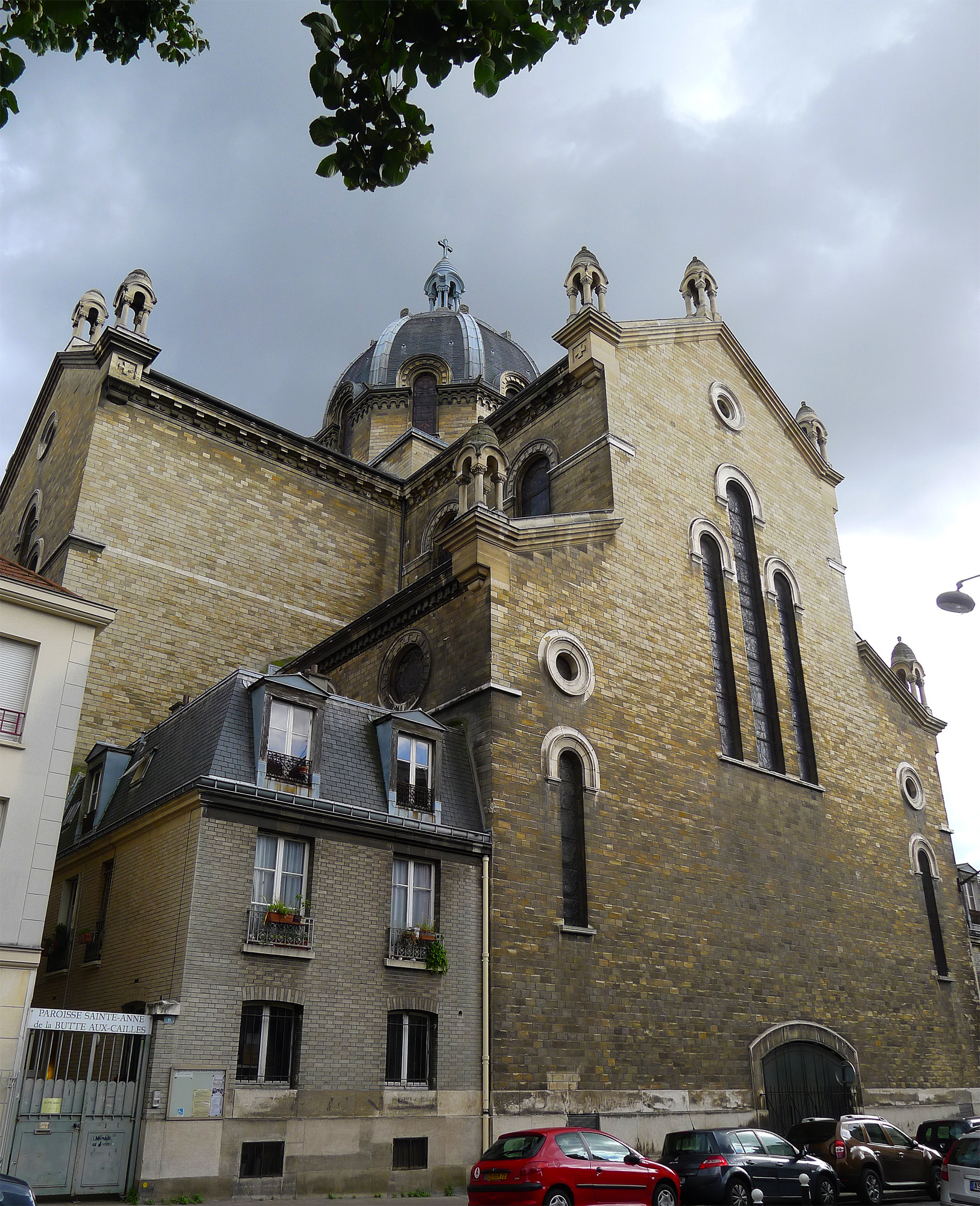
Chevet

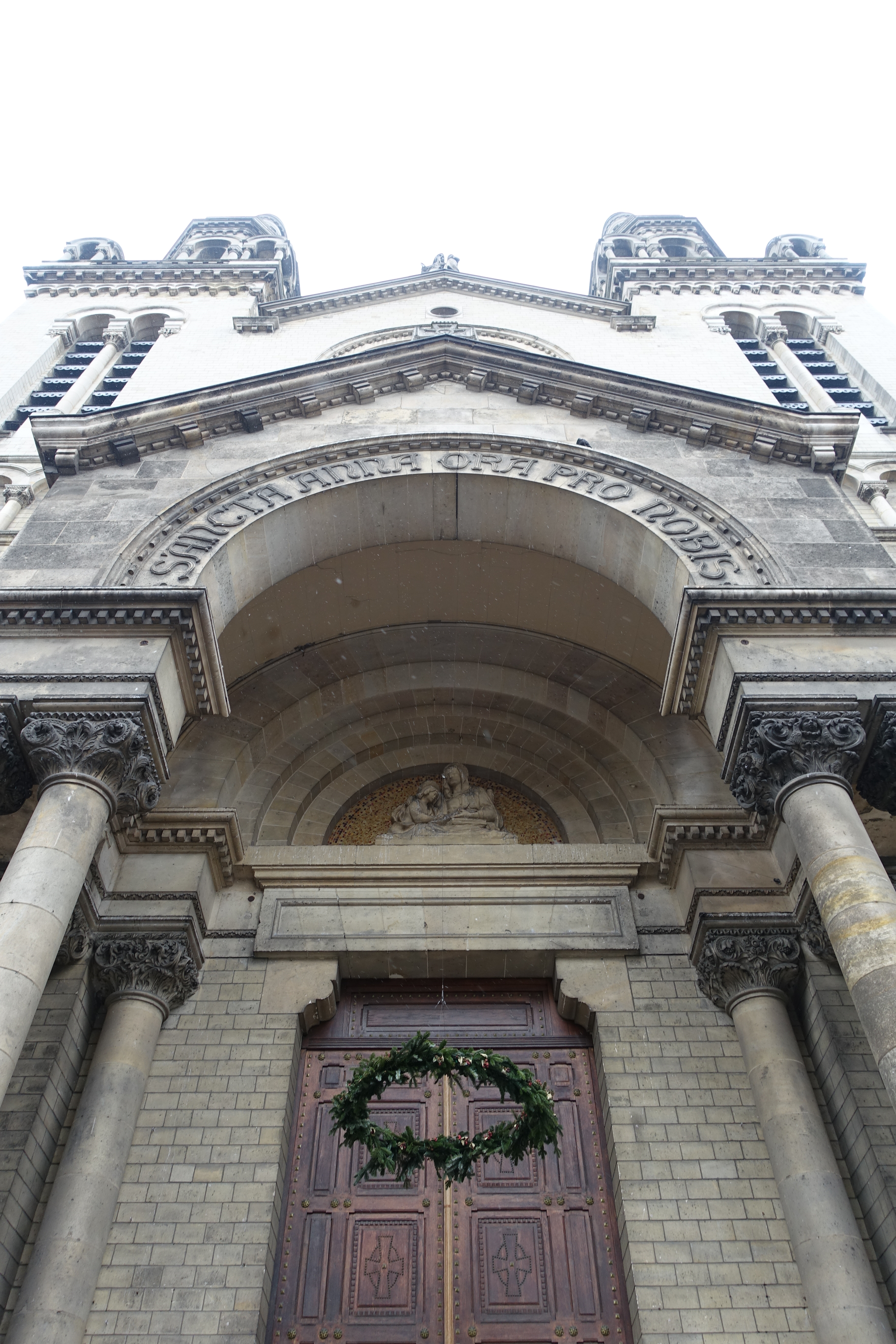
The portal

The church was constructed on the old riverbed of the River Bievre, which required exceptional means of supporter stability. It was built atop seventy-seven pilings, reaching down to the rocky substratum between 16 and 22 meters below the ground.

Two towers 55 meters high flank the facade of the church. In addition, there is a large cupola, in the Roman-Byzantine style, over the transept of the church. ine style,Theconstruction of the towers was largely financed by the Lombard family, who own several local enterprises, mincluding Meunier Chocolate. The facade is popularly known as the "Chocolate Towers."

== Interior ==
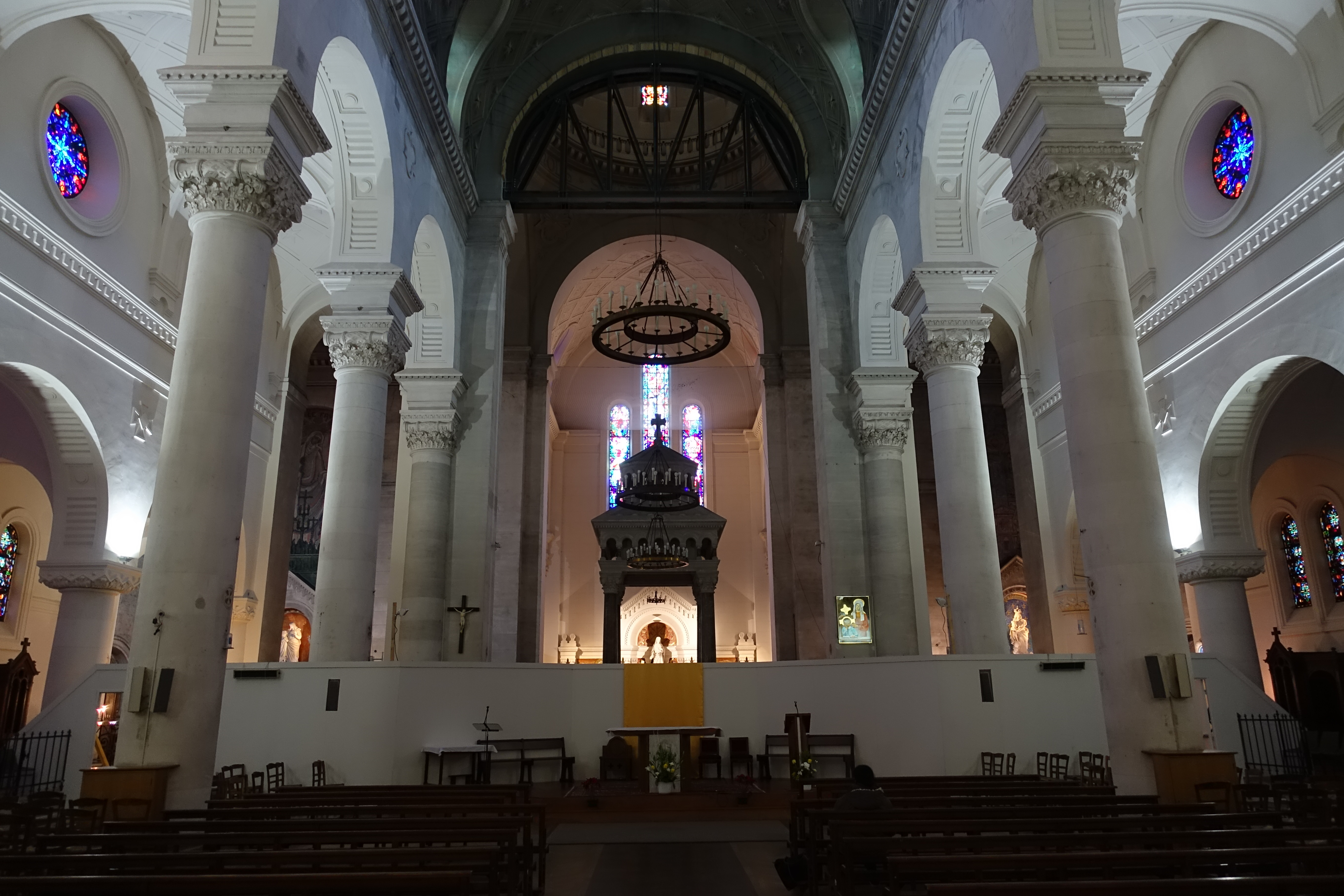
The nave facing the choir

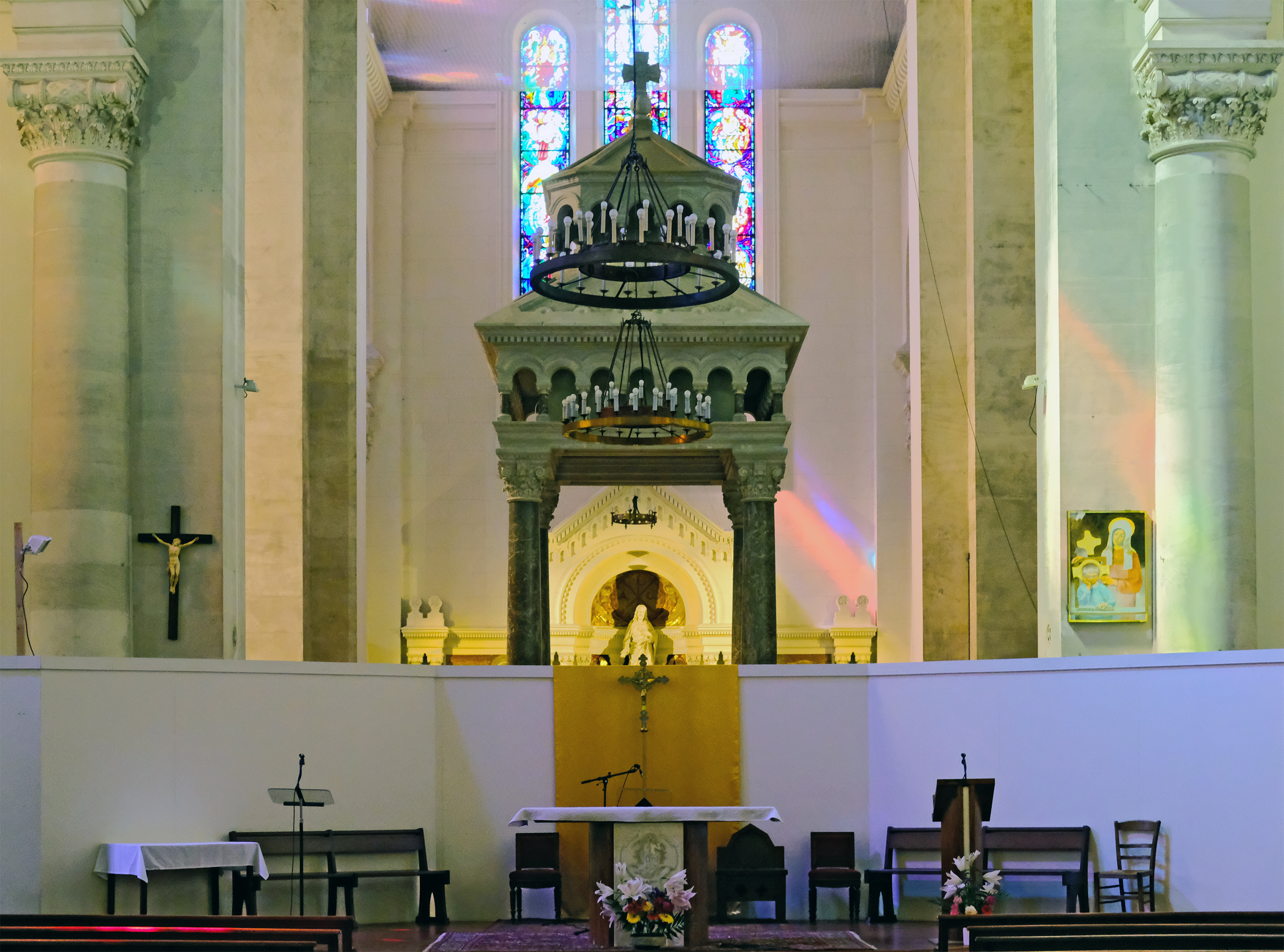
The choir and the ciborium over the altar

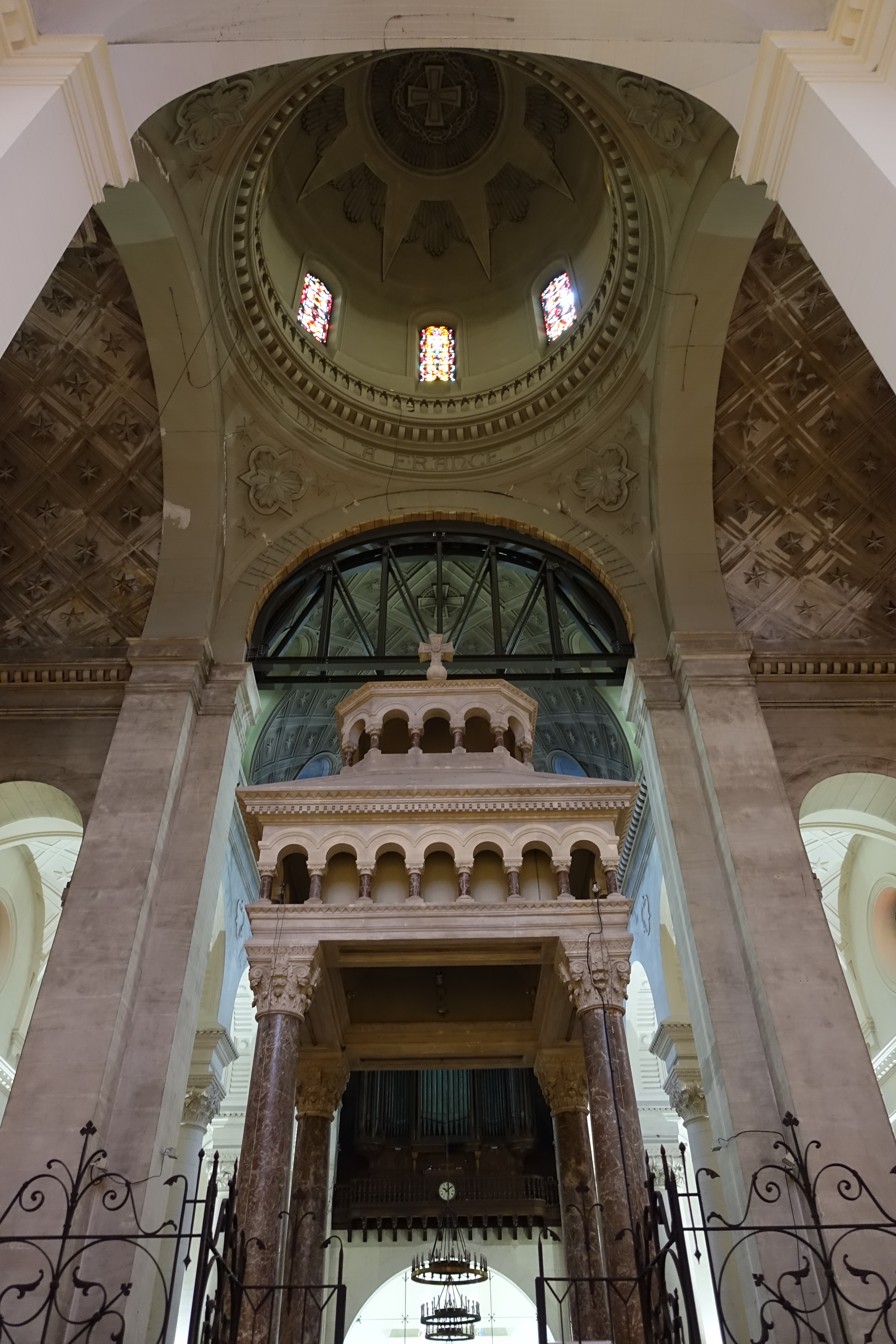
The cupola over the altar

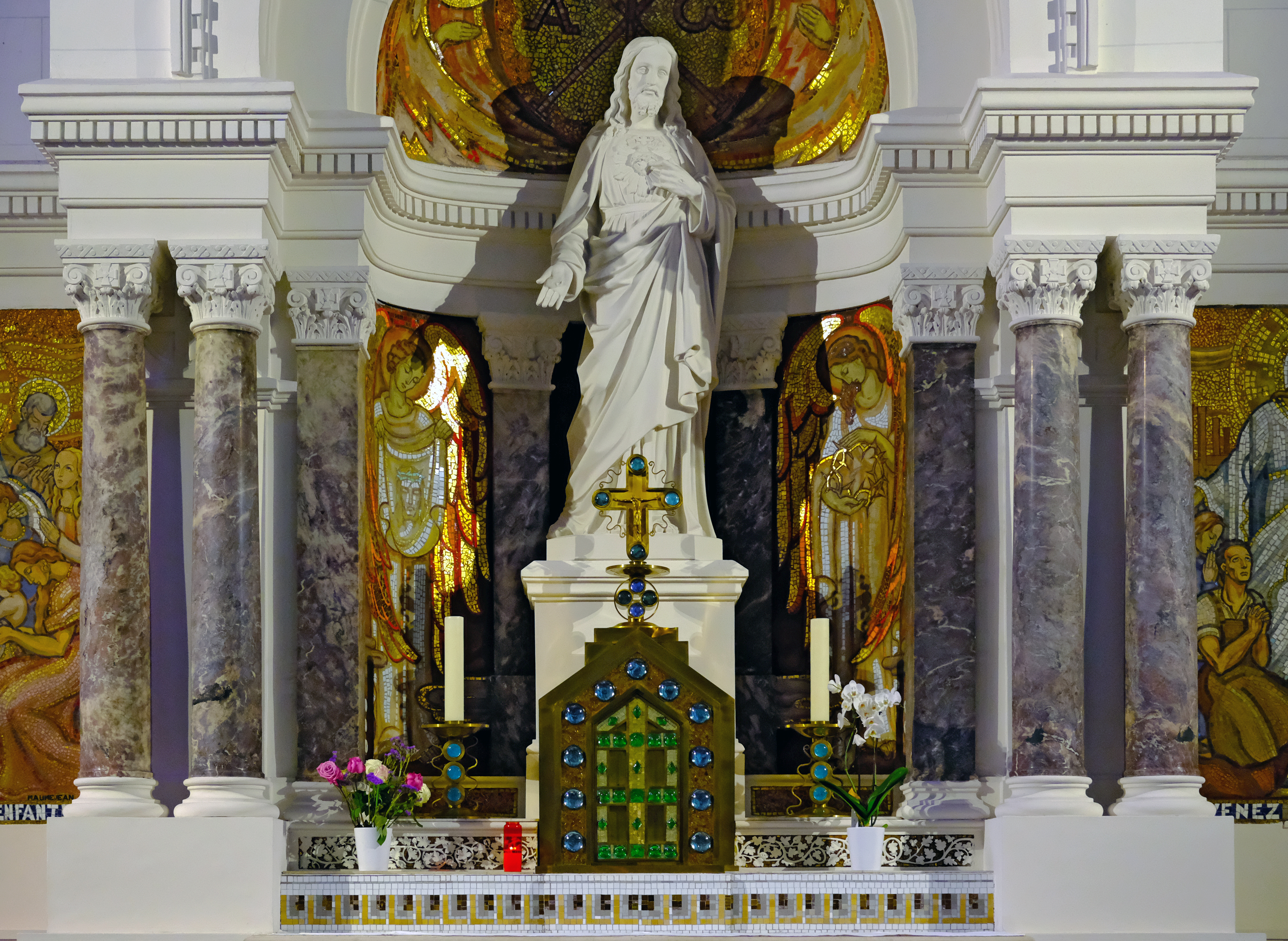
The Chapel of the Sacred Heart, behind the altar

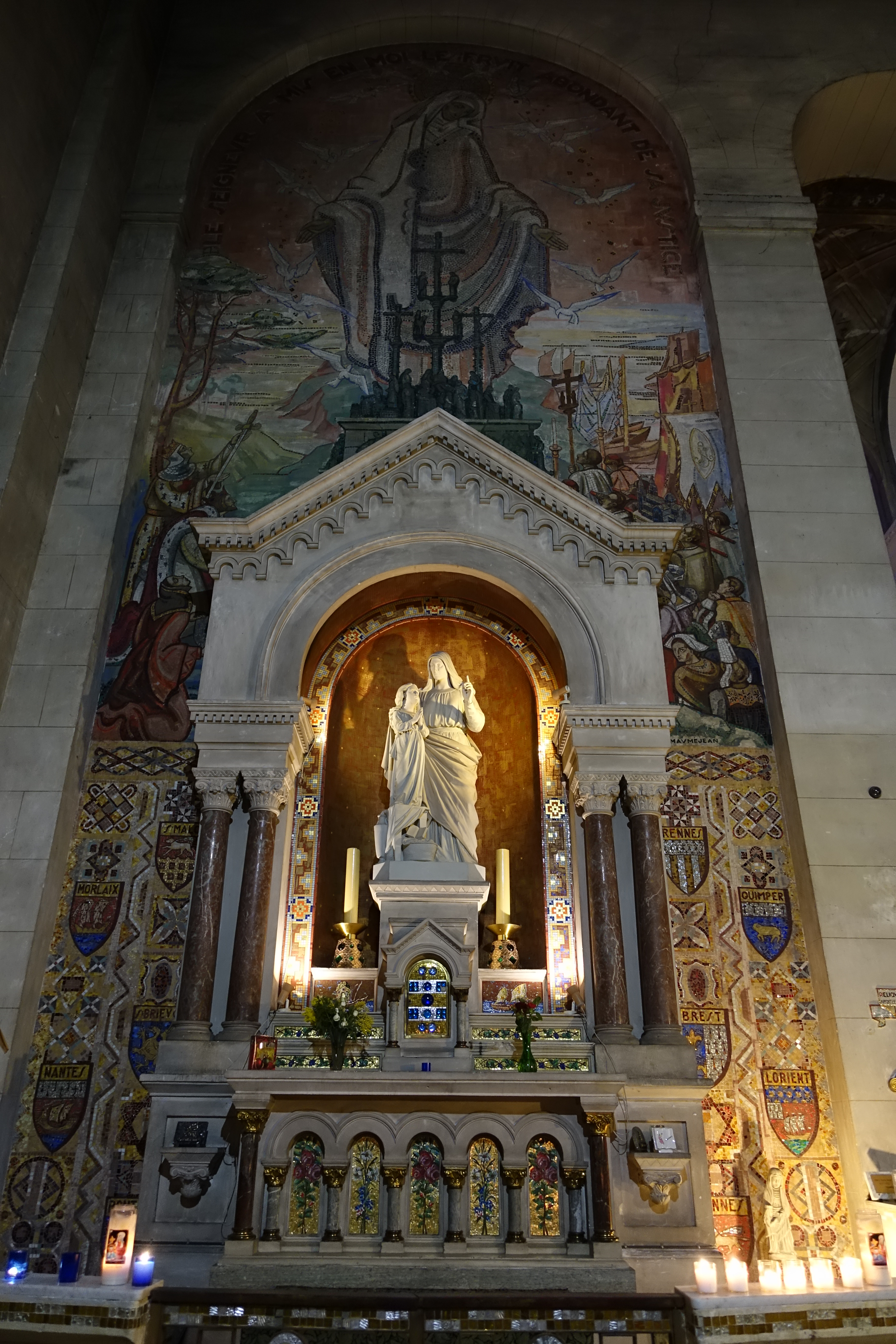
The Chapel of Saint Anne behind the ciborium

== Stained Glass ==
The windows are small and the light in the interior is dim, but the windows are bright and colourful nd add highlights to the nave and choir. They depict both elaborate narratives and abstract designs in the Art Deco style. They were added in 1938 by Charles Maumejean, who also designed the mosaics in the church.

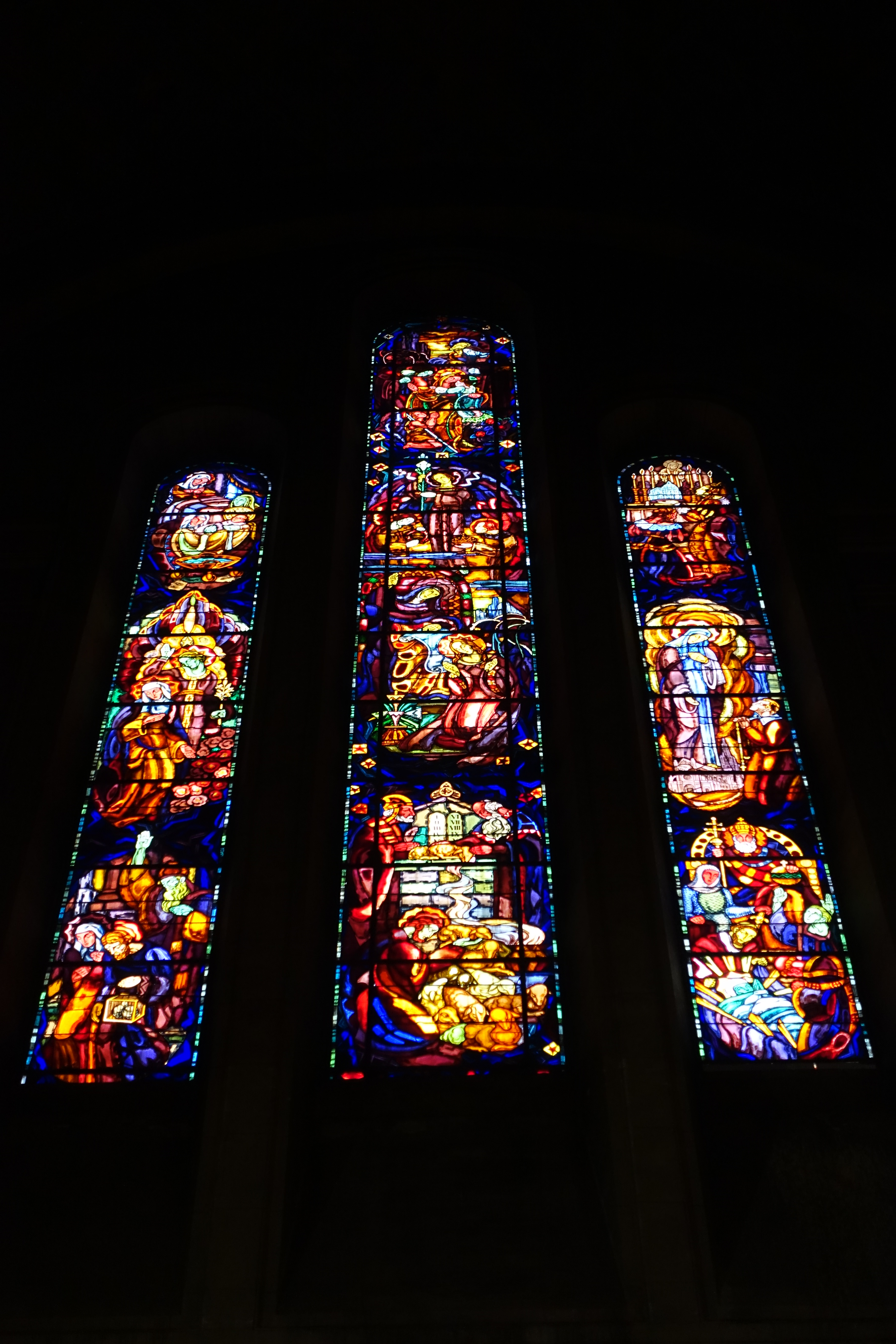
"Scenes from the life of St. Mary and Jesus"

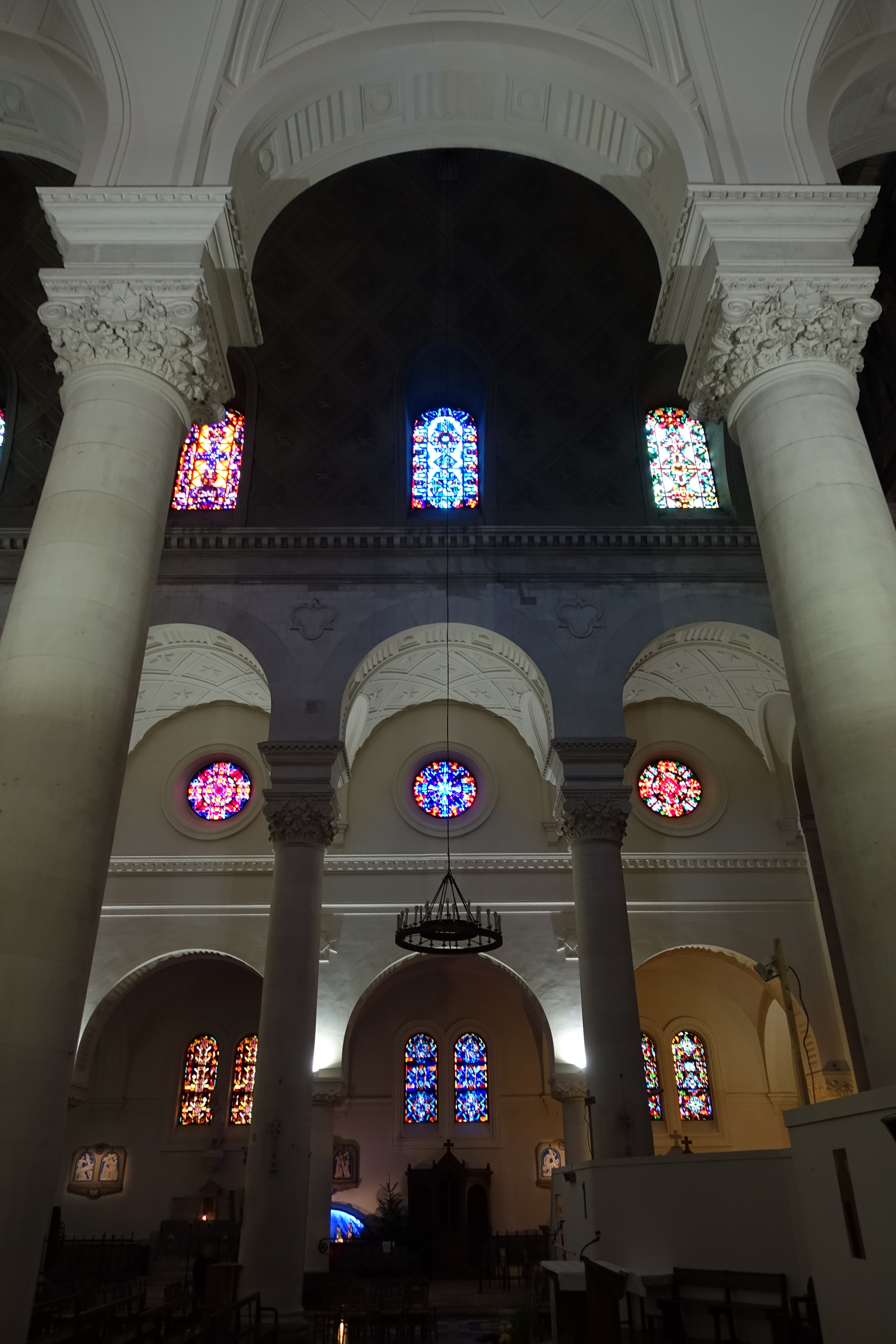
Art Deco abstract designs

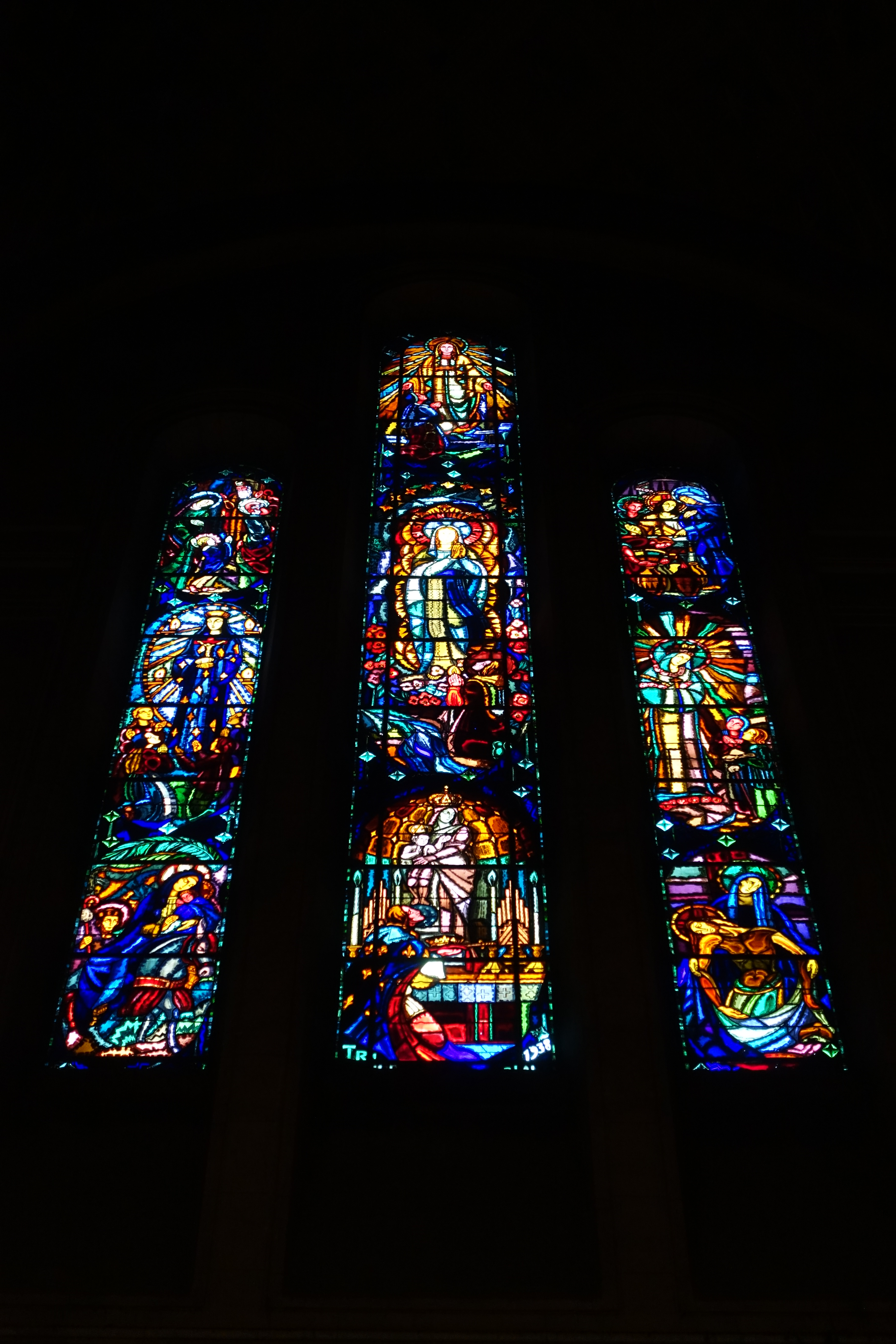
"Evocations of the Virgin"

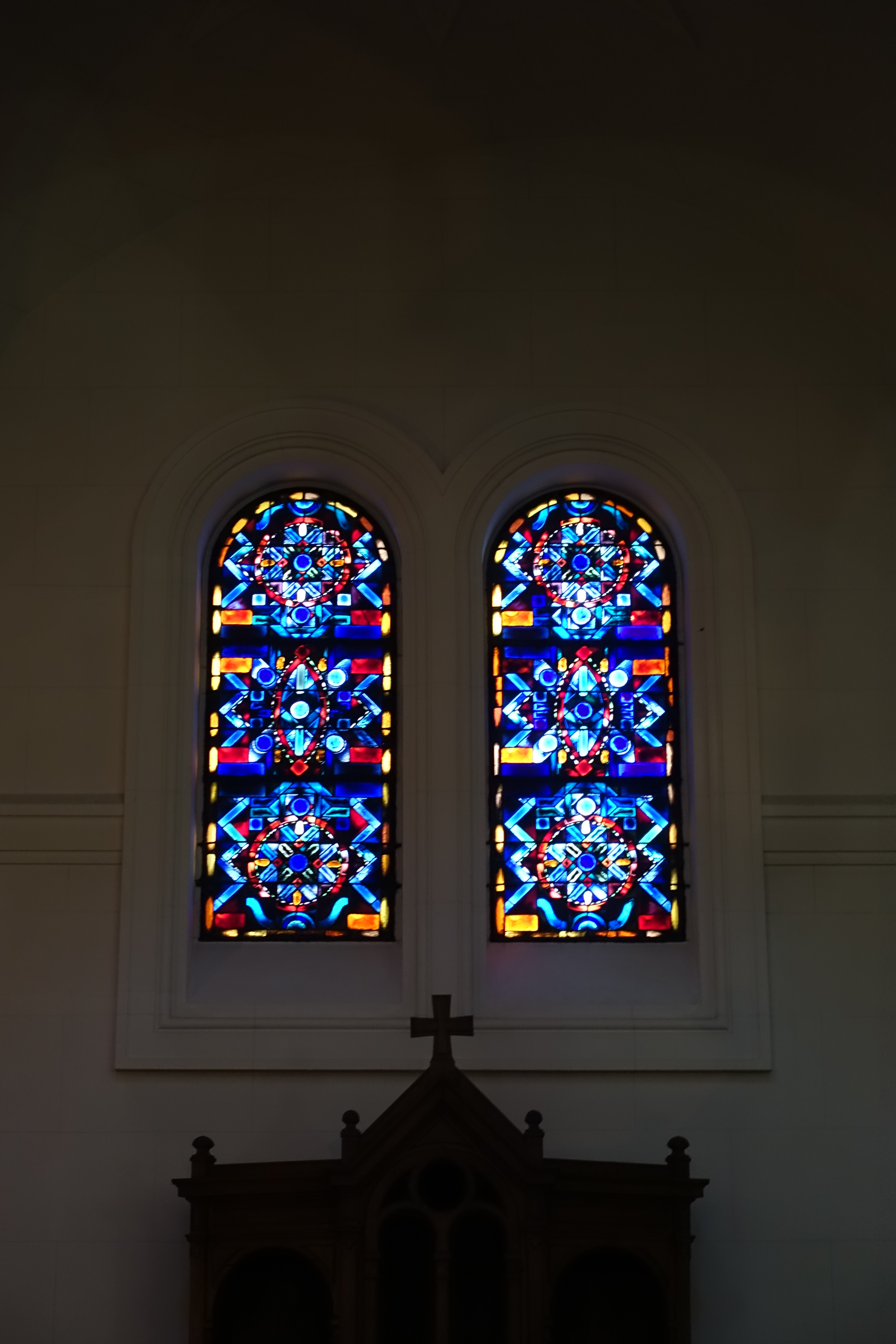
Art Deco abstract designs

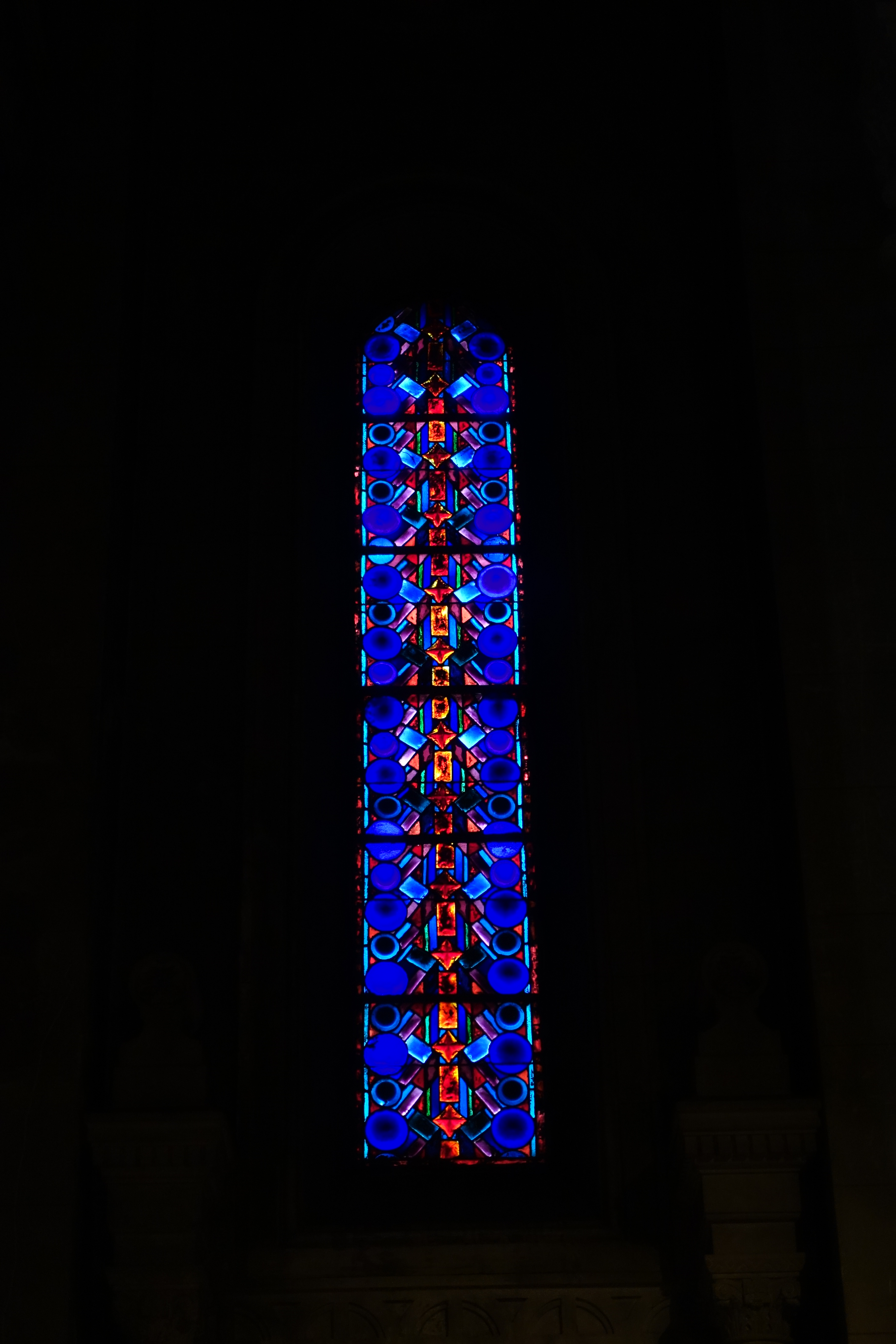
Art Deco abstract designs

== Art and Decoration ==
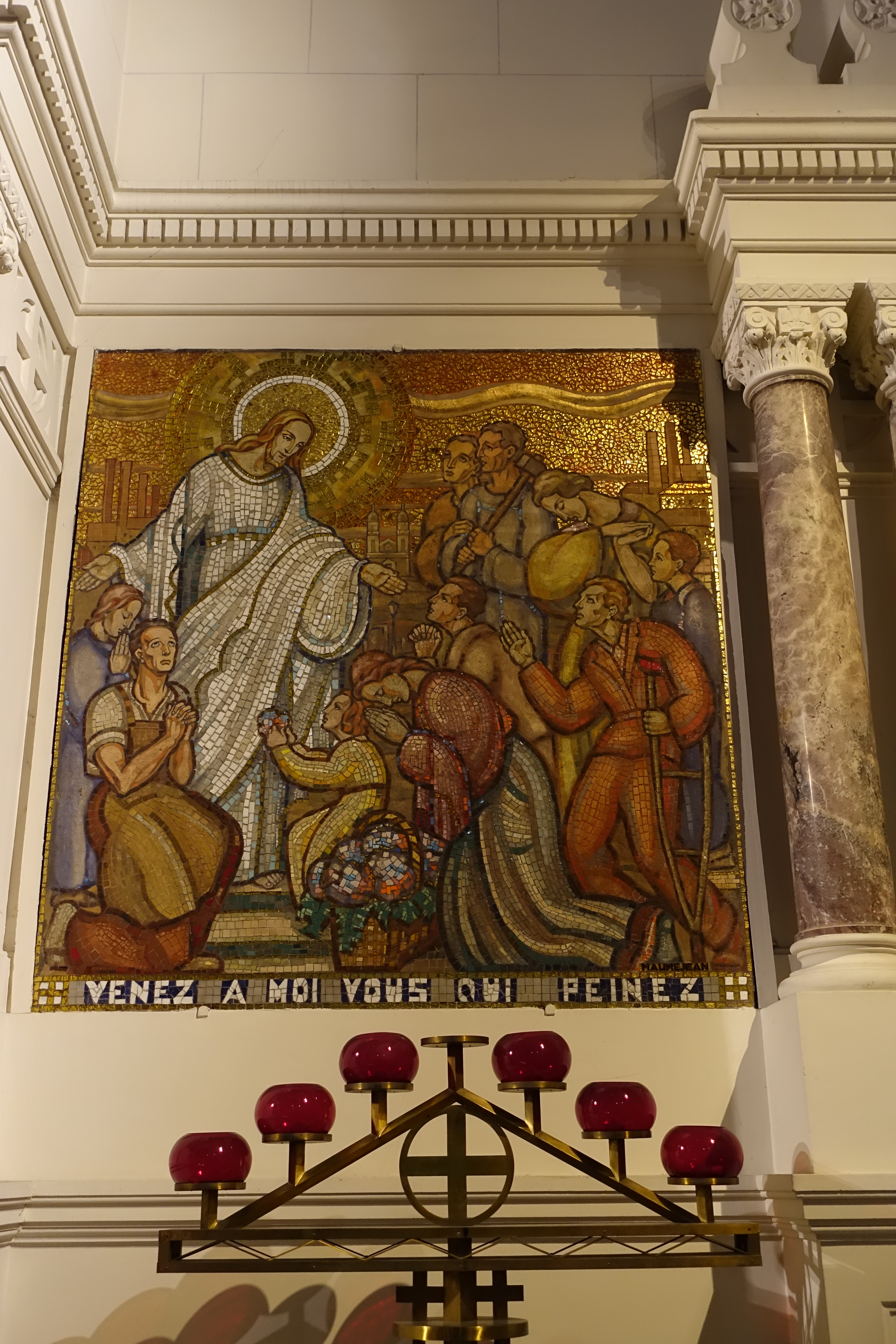
"Christ with children" Mosaic by Freres Maumejean (1938)

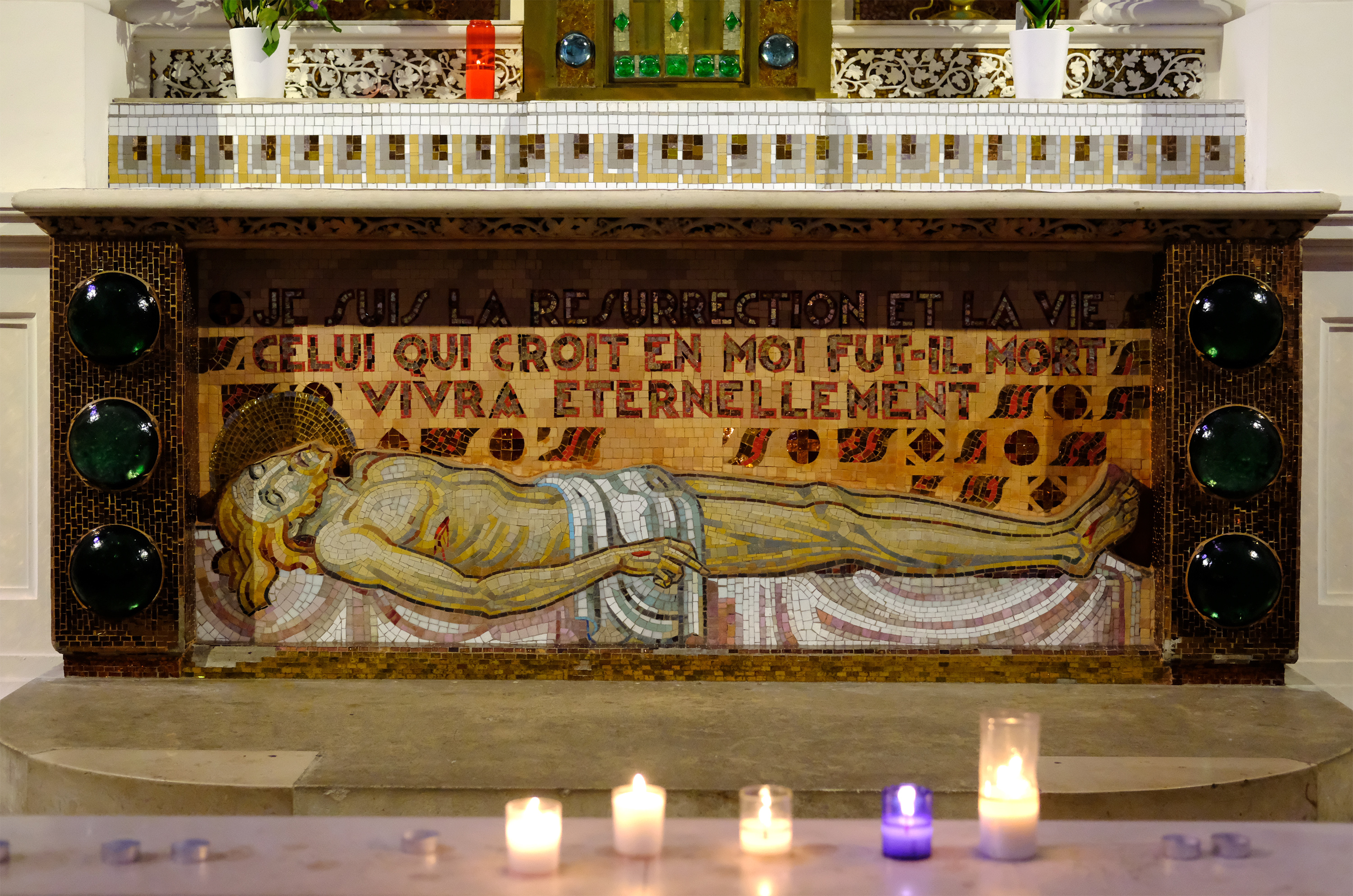
Chapel of the Sacred Heart of Jesus

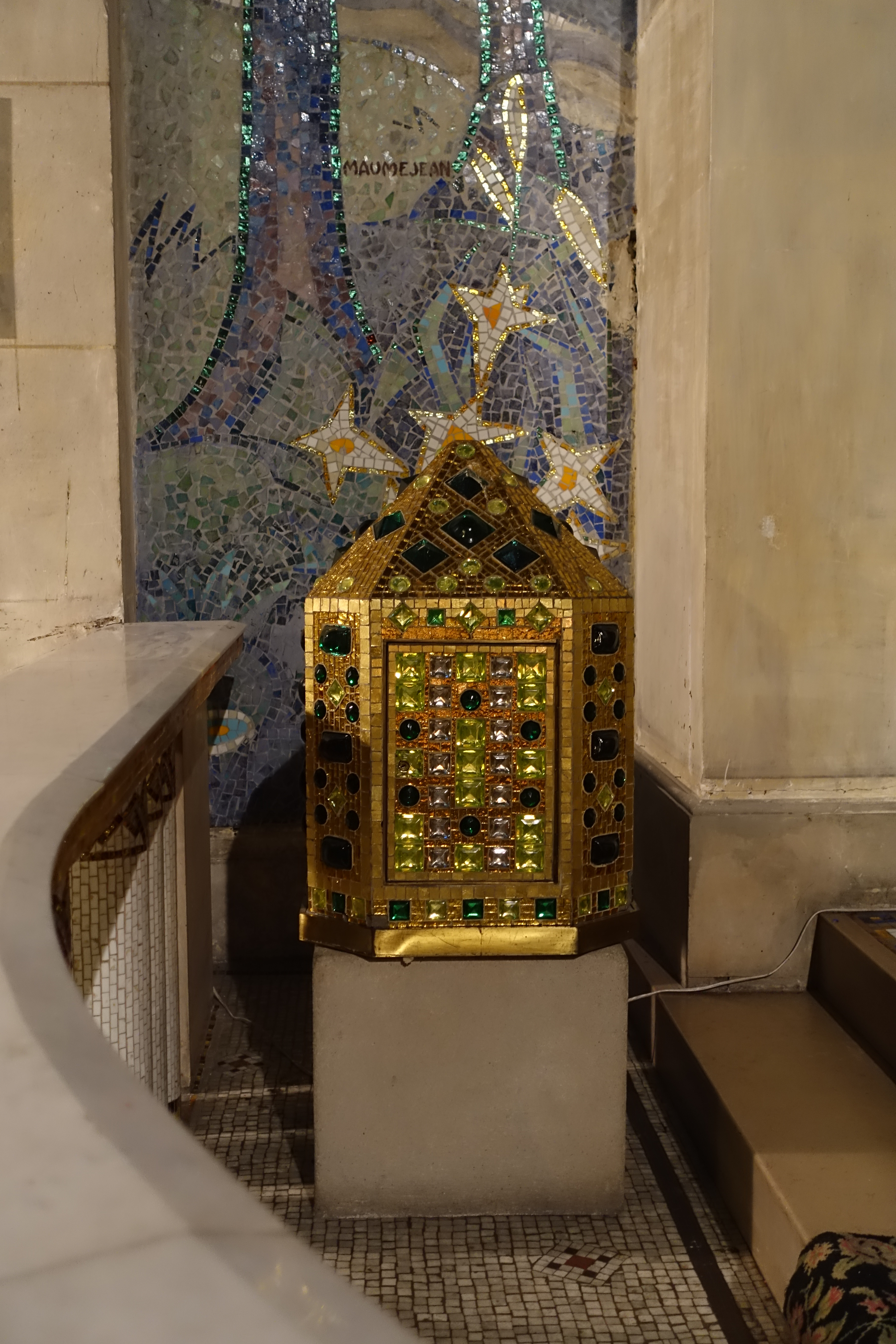
Tabernacle in the choir, with mosaic decoration by Freres Maumejean

== The Grand Organ ==
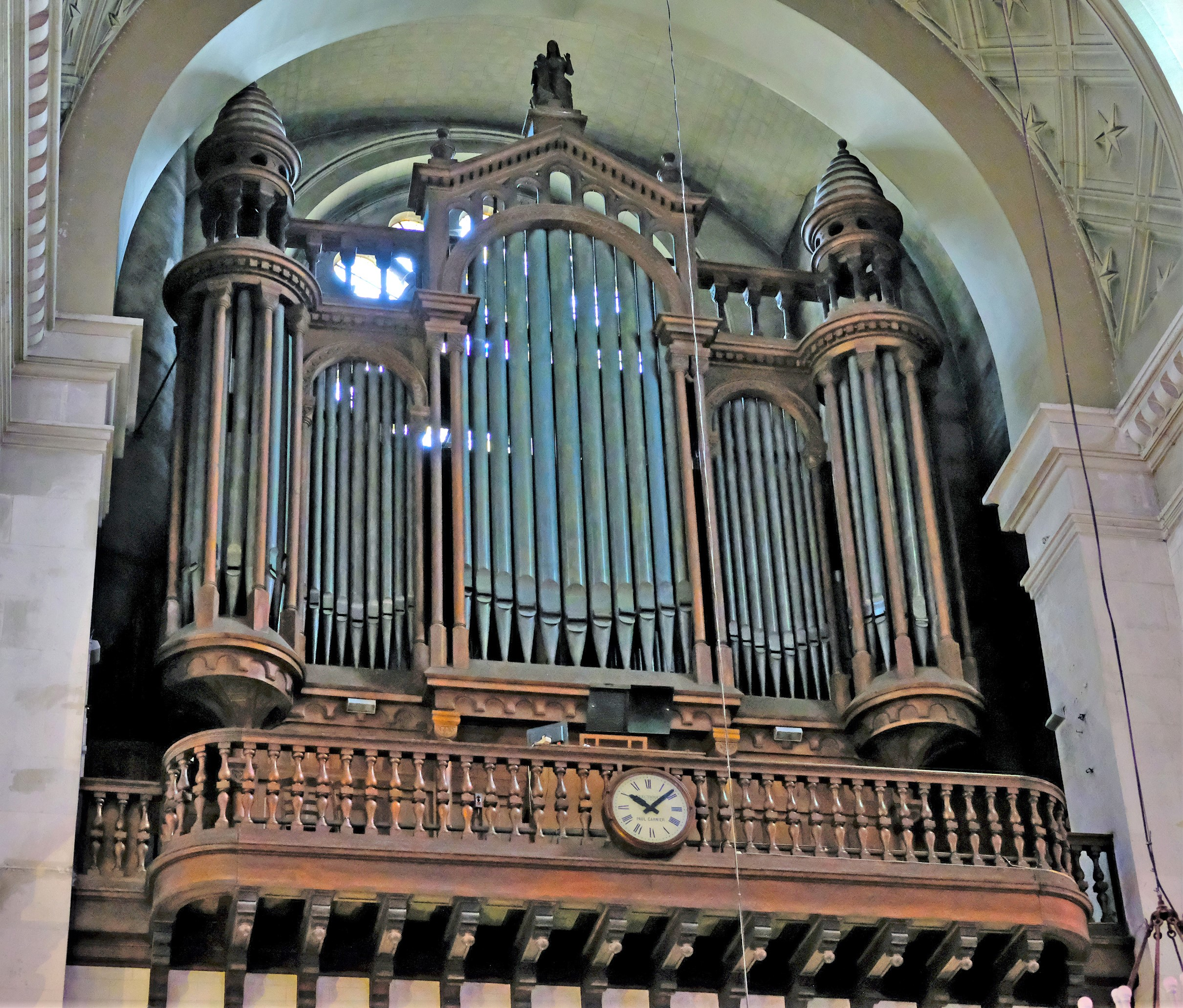
The grand organ (1927)

The grand organ , located in the tribune of the church, was made by the Abbey workshop ion Paris. It was put in place in 1927.

== Notes and citations ==
=== External sources ===
- fr:Église Sainte-Anne de la Butte-aux-Cailles Article in the French Wikipedia
