= Erasmus Vitellius =

Polish bishop and diplomat

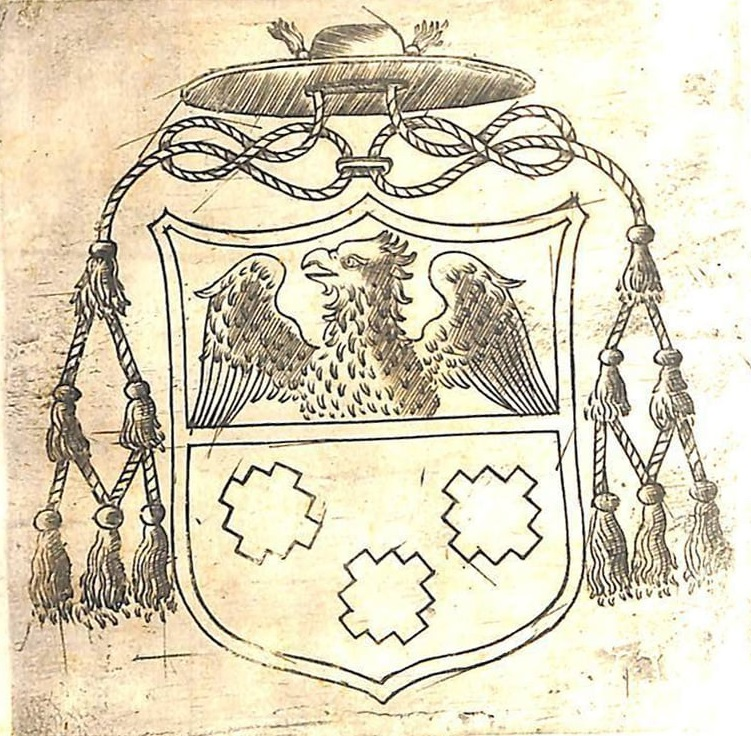
Coat of arms of Erasmus Vitellius

Erasmus Vitellius (c 1470–1522) was a 16th-century Roman Catholic Bishop of Płock in Poland, who then served the prince Alexander as a diplomat.

Born in 1470 at Kraków to humble parents. His education was patronized by Ciolek de Vitellio, whose name he assumed. In 1504, he was appointed bishop of Płock by Alexander Jagiellon, King of Poland (1501-1506). At the lord's disposition he twice was sent to Rome to speak to Pope Julius II. In 1518 he was sent by King Sigismund I to the Diet of Augsburg to solicit aid against the Ottoman Turks, and subsequently to Rome to seek the mediation of Pope Leo X regarding the conflict between Poland and the Teutonic knights. The negotiations proved very dilatory and treaties were not signed until after Vitellius died.

His correspondence was collected in the Acta Regalia by Stanislaus Gorski, and his biography was written in the work on Polish literature (Kraków, 1819) by Count Ossolinski, a prefect of the Imperial Library of Vienna.
