= Józef Maksymilian Ossoliński =

- Count
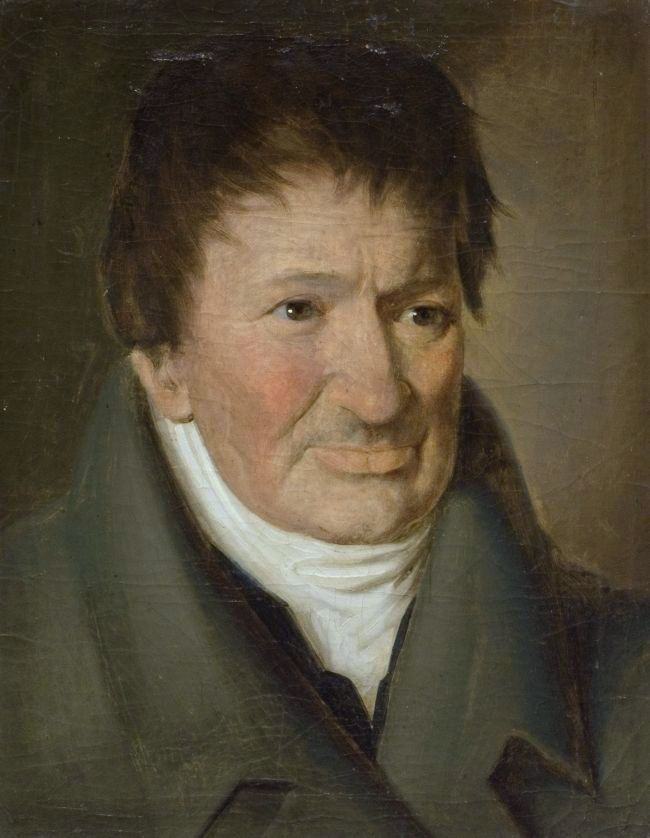
- Portrait by Jan Maszkowski
- Coat of arms: Topór
- Born: 1748; Wola Mielecka
- Died: 17 March 1826 (aged 77–78); Vienna
- Family: Ossoliński
- Consort: Teresa Jabłonowska
- Father: Michał Ossoliński
- Mother: Anna Szaniewska

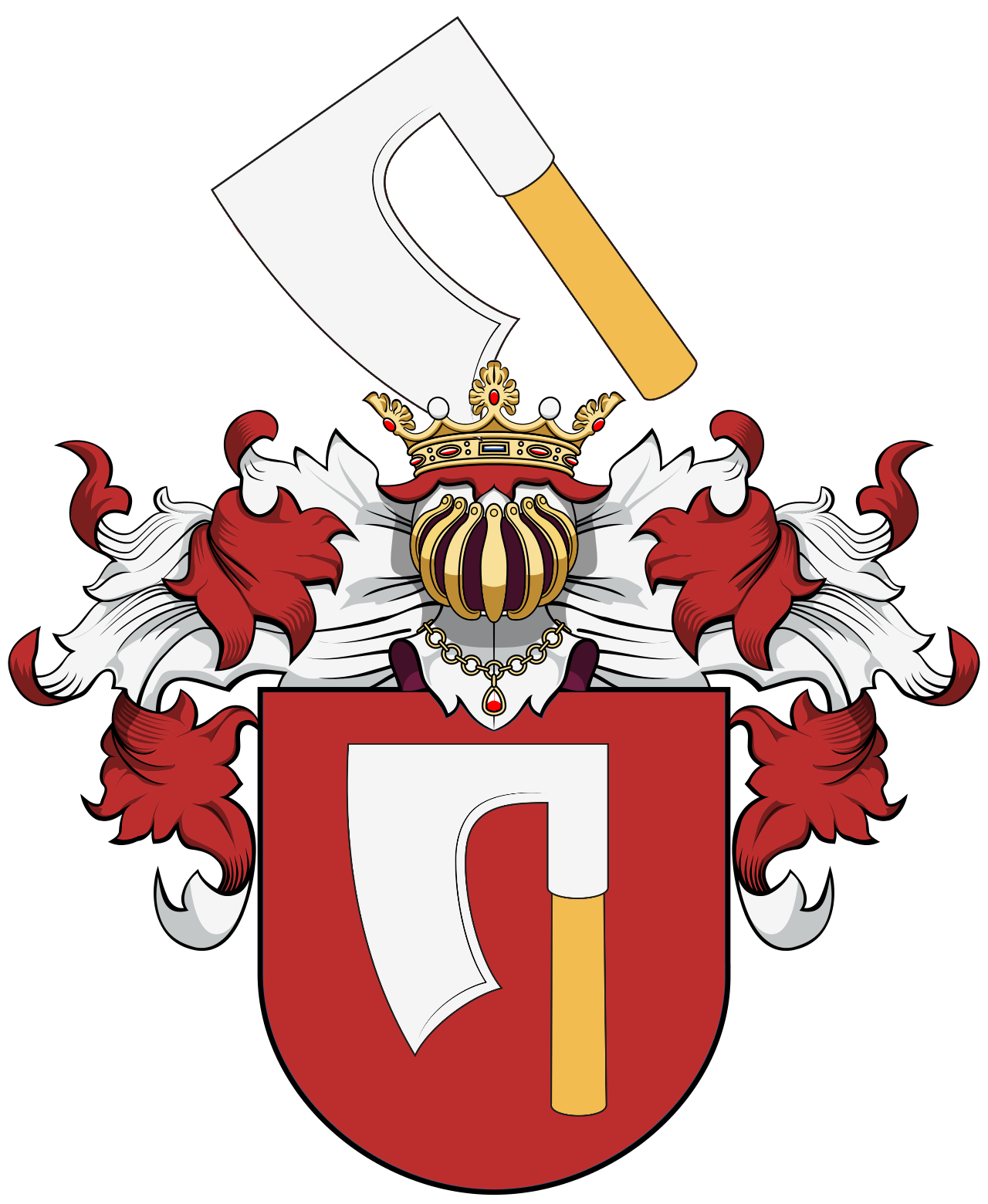
Topór coat of arms

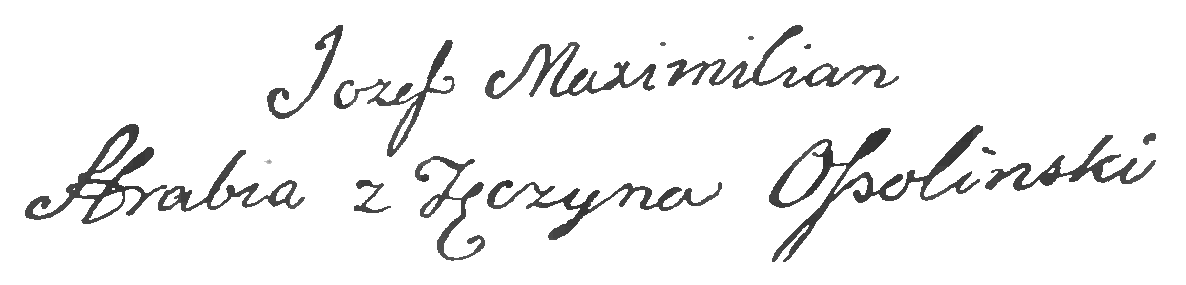
Signature of Józef Maksymilian Ossoliński

Count Józef Kajetan Piotr Maksymilian Ossoliński known as Józef Maksymilian Ossoliński (1748 – 17 March 1826) was a Polish nobleman, landowner, politician, novelist, poet, historian and researcher into literature, historian, translator, lexicographer, bibliophile, a forerunner of Slavic studies and a leading figure of the Polish Enlightenment. He founded the Ossoliński Institute in Lwów to which he donated his immense library and other collections of manuscripts and coins.

Józef was a member of many learned institutions, and a doctor honoris causa of the Jagiellonian University. He became one of the first Polish politicians from Galicia. He took Austrian citizenship when he became prefect of the Imperial Austrian Library in 1793 in Vienna. He employed Samuel Linde as his "Gräfliche Ossolinskische Bibliothekar", librarian of the Ossoliński Library until 1803 and under his patronage compiler of the first Polish Lexicon.

== Biography ==
He was born in Wola Mielecka, near Sandomierz. His father, Michał Ossoliński was castellan of Czchów and owner of the estates at Mielec, Zgórsk, Cyranka, Piątkowiec, Wola Mielecka, Partyn, Izbiska. His mother was Anna Szaniawska. He had a strict upbringing as befitted a young nobleman of the day. Józef was regarded as deeply religious, modest and shy.

From 1762 to 1771 he attended the highly rated Jesuit Collegium Nobilium in Warsaw. He was taught there by distinguished professors, Adam Naruszewicz, poet, historian and editor, Karol Wyrwicz, geographer, historian and educationalist, Franciszek Bohomolec, author of many ruthless satires about the excesses of the nobility and by I. Nagurczewski and J. Albertrandi. All these men belonged to the intellectual circle of the last king of Poland, Stanisław August Poniatowski. While in Warsaw, Ossoliński also performed research at the Załuski Library.

Following the First Partition of Poland in 1772 which "sanctioned" a land grab by the Habsburg monarchy, the Ossoliński estates found themselves in the Kingdom of Galicia and Lodomeria. Apart from administering the family estates and the occasional trips to Warsaw, Jozef gave himself over to literary pursuits. The Austrians soon awarded him the title of Count. In 1785 he married a relative, Countess Teresa Jabłonowska. The marriage was childless and came to an end in 1791.

Between 1789 and 1793 he sat on a committee reviewing the administrative constitution of Galicia to little effect. At the same time he was head of a delegation (1790-1793) to Leopold II, Margrave of Austria. In 1792 He travelled around Central Europe, taking in: Saxony, Bavaria, Austria, Czech lands and Moravia. In 1793 he spent some time in Vienna where he frequented Austrian minister, Thugut, which enabled him to be an intermediary between the Austrian government and members of the Kosciuszko Insurrection (1794). At that time he supported a patriotic Polish daily newspaper in Lwów, "Dziennik Patriotycznych Polaków" (1792-1798), and lobbied on behalf of imprisoned Polish activists who numbered Hugo Kołłątaj among them.

After the Third Partition of Poland (1795) the occupying powers intensified their policies of germanisation and russification closing down native educational establishments, cultural centres and introducing the invader's language into all administrative matters. The greatest loss for Polish culture were the wholesale deportations to Russia of magnificent Polish cultural collections such as the Załuski Library. In the circumstances a number of leading lights in Poland determined to create a national library collection. They included Adam K. Czartoryski of Puławy, Tadeusz Czacki of Krzemieniec and Józef Maksymilian Ossoliński.

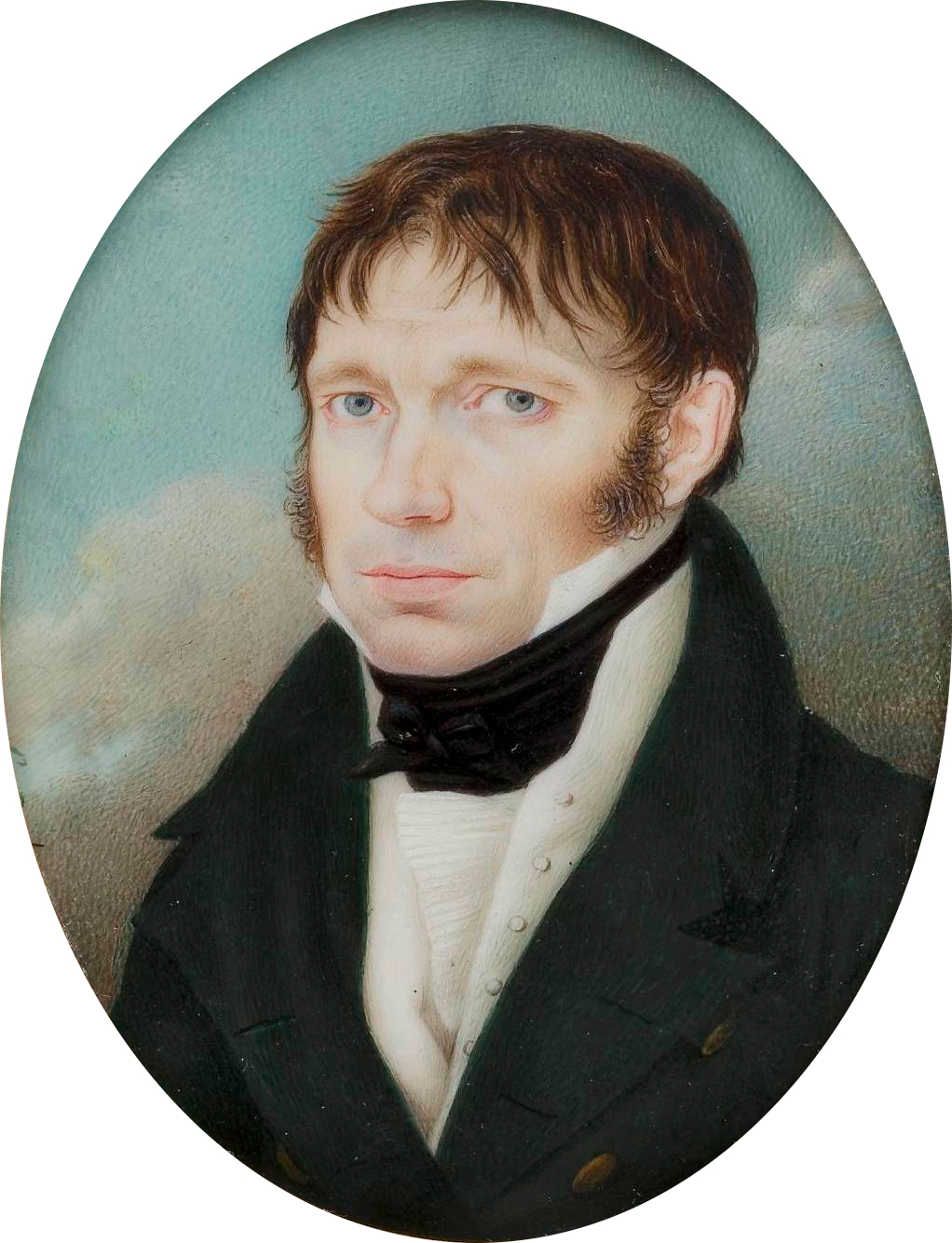
Miniature portrait of Samuel Bogumił Linde

To this end from 1794 Ossoliňski hired the services of the German, intellectual and bibliographer, Samuel Linde. In the years he spent with Ossoliński he gathered sufficient material for a Polish lexicon, for which he consulted widely in Polish and Slav sources in the count's own collection and benefitted from his mentoring. As a result Linde's fame prospered so that in 1804 he was appointed headmaster of the Warsaw Lyceum.

From 1795 Ossoliński settled permanently in Vienna where he devoted himself to research and his passion for books. In that period he began collecting materials on a grand scale for his projected national cultural foundation. In 1808 he was nominated as clandestine consultant to the Austrian court and the following year he became prefect of the Imperial Library, which he successfully defended from looting by Napoleon's invading army. He spent 15 years (1808-1823) as curator of the Galician Economic Institute. He was granted the distinction of Royal Marshall by Emperor Francis I of Austria and honoured with the Order of St Stephen of Hungary and Court Bursar of the Kingdom of Galicia and Lodomeria.

From 1800 he was a member of the Society of Friends of Science in Warsaw, the Warsaw Scientific Society, the Wilno Academy, the Kraków Academy, the Royal Societies in Prague and Göttingen, the Imperial Royal Society in Vienna, the University of Vilna and the Moravian-Silesian Agricultural Society. The University of Lwow gave him an Honorary doctorate in philosophy in 1820.

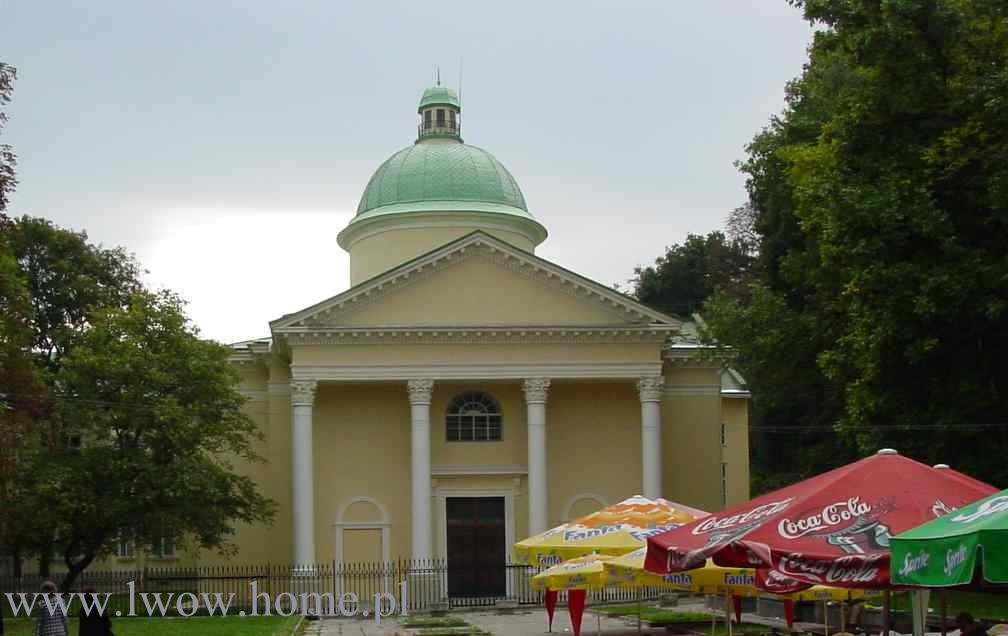
The Ossolineum Library converted by Józef Bem from the former church of St Agnes

Ossoliński acquired the former Carmelite convent and church in Lwow along with the ruin that was St Agnes' church. A few months later he persuaded Emperor Francis to issue him with a statute for his foundation 8 May 1817. The principal provider of books to Ossoliński was the Lwow bookseller, Karol Wild.

In his highly complicated act of foundation, Ossoliński laid down the staffing and financial arrangements and made express provision for the publication of a newsletter to report on the scientific progress of the institute. In 1823 Ossoliński agreed with prince Henryk Lubomirski that he should donate his collections to the new library, but as a distinct museum collection.

In 1820 his health failed badly and in 1823 he lost his sight. He died after a long illness in Vienna in March 1826. His grave has disappeared as it was in the part of the Matzleinsdorf Protestant Cemetery that was given up for road building.

In 1826 the Galician assembly entrusted Gwalbert Pawlikowski, secretary to the Vienna court, with the task of adopting and cataloguing of Ossoliński's collections in Vienna which he achieved in 10 months and despatched to Lwow. The 52 enormous crates contained 10, 121 works in 19, 055 volumes, plus various journals 567 manuscripts 133 maps and 1445 etchings.

== Writing ==
=== Selected works in Polish ===
- "My Age", Wiek mój. Rękopismo starożytne od końca panowania Zygmunta I aż do panowania Zygmunta III rozciągające się, znalezione przez J. M. h. T.
- "there is no cure for love", Na miłość nie masz lekarstwa
- condolences to a widow, 1780, Do... Pani z hrabiów Ossolińskich hrabiny Jabłonowski... z okoliczności śmierci jej męża wiersz cieszący, (podpis: J. M. h. O.)
- "stories about ghosts and ghouls and other comic pieces", composed 1793-1794,Wieczory badeńskie, czyli powieści o strachach i upiorach, z dołączeniem bajek i innych pism humorystycznych,, fragm. "Przyjaciel Ludu", "Friend of the People", 1844 t. 2, 1845 t. 2, 1846; posthumous publication J.Czech, Kraków 1852 (tu m.in.: Przekłady poz. 8); rękopis: Ossolineum, sygn. 660-662/II, 2755/I, 12717/I; przekł. czeski (1840)
- "The need for teaching law in our country", O potrzebie nauki prawa w naszym kraju, Warsaw 1814
- Foreword to a work on ancient Poles, Przedmowa (do) M. Juszyński: Krótkie przypowieści dawnych Polaków, Kraków (1819); autorstwo definitywnie rozwiązuje T. Mikulski (W kręgu oświeconych, s. 410)
- "The origins of the Slav people", Początki Sławian. Rozprawy 1-4, z rękopisów Ossolineum sygn. 1291-1294/I wyd. K. Słotwiński, "Czasopismo Naukowe od Zakładu Narodowego im. Ossolińskich Wyd." 1831 zeszyty 1, 4; 1832 zeszyt 1; 1833 zeszyty 3-8, (inne redakcje, notaty i rozprawy do opracowywanej przez Osolińskiego historii Słowian zachowane są m.in. w rękopisach Ossolineum: sygn. 1091-1093/I, 1097/I, 1287-1290/I, 12706-12711/I

=== Translations ===
- Titus Livius: Dialogue between Pyrrhus and Fabricius Luscinus about the duties and obligations of citizenship" dostatkach i ubóstwie obywatelskim, "Zabawy Przyjemne i Pożyteczne" 1771 t. 3, cz. 2, s. 209-222; także wyd. 2 – 1780
- Dialogue between Plato and Aesop (from the French), "Zabawy Przyjemne i Pożyteczne" 1771 t. 4, cz. 1, s. 17-28; także wyd. 2 – 1793, (podpis: J. H. O. K. C.)
- Bernard Le Bovier de Fontenelle "Nouveaux dialogues des morts": ogłoszone anonimowo w "Zabawach Przyjemnych i Pożytecznych 1772 t. 6, cz. 2, s. 339-368; 1773 t. 7, cz. 1, s. 113-121, 177-201 – Ossoliński współpracował bowiem w tym okresie z redakcją "Zabaw Przyjemnych i Pożytecznych")
- Albrecht von Haller "Satire applied to the states of the Bernese republic", Satyra... stosowana do stanów Rzeczypospolitej Berneńskiej, rękopis: Ossolineum, sygn. 1295/II, k. 67-67v., (przekł. prozą)
- Seneca, "On consolation", O pocieszeniu ksiąg troje, Warszawa 1782; rękopis: Ossolineum, sygn. 763/I; w rękopisie, sygn. 1295/II, k. 3-13: Życie Seneki filozofa, (z dedykacją dla Stanisława Augusta)
- Lucian, "The Lover of lies", Łgarze i niedowiarek. Rozmowa między Tychiadem a Filoklesem. Z Lucyna, wyd. zobacz Ważniejsze dzieła poz. 4
- Livy, "History of Rome", Dzieje rzymskie t. 1-3, "Tłumaczenia w czasie ślepoty zaczęte 1 maja 1823", wyd. Lwów 1850; rękopisy: Ossolineum, sygn. 3122-3147/I; fragm. brulionowe księgi 1-2 sygn. 12716/II, s. 1-88
- Pliny the Younger, "EpistulaeListów przyjacielskich ksiąg cztery, przeł. 1825, rękopis: Ossolineum, sygn. 1304/I
- Homer, the Illiad books 1-3, m/s: Ossolineum, sygn. 1155/I; fragm. z księgi 1 sygn. 12716/II, s. 89-119, (przekł. prozą i obszerne streszczenie; według przekł. francuskiego G. Massieugo)
- Juvenal, Satires, m/s: Ossolineum, sygn. 1032/I
- Xenophon AgesilausRzecz na króla Agezylausza rozdz. 1, rękopis: Ossolineum, sygn. 12716/II, k. 117-124.

=== Correspondence and other papers ===
- To Tadeusz Czacki, 23 April 1798, from M/S in the Czartoryski Palace (Puławy) Biblioteki Czartoryskich
- Correspondence with Samuel Linde, 1799-1804, 6 letters, see: S. B. Linde: Słownik języka polskiego, wyd. 2, t. 1, Lwów 1854,
- To Adam Kazimierz Czartoryski, 5 September 1803, ogł. L. Dębicki: Puławy t. 3, Lwów 1888, s. 68 – 2 listy z roku 1803 ogł. W. A. Francew: Polskoje sławianowiedienije konca XVIII i pierwoj czetwierti XIX st., Praga 1906, s. 112 i następne – 2 listy z roku 1803, ogł. J. Kallenbach: Zakładowi Narodowemu im. Ossolińskich, "Przegląd Współczesny" t. 25 (1928), s. 177-181
- To Andrzej Alojzy Ankwicz archbishop of Prague, kopiowane z oryginałów przez A. Grabowskiego, rękopis: Biblioteka Jagiellońska, sygn. 2831; Ossolineum, sygn. 1448/I – do Ankwicza z 10 kwietnia 1811, rękopis: Archiwum Akt Dawnych Miasta Krakowa, sygn. E 70 – do Ankwicza 2 listy z roku 1817, fragmenty ogł. A. Bar: Z korespondencji J. M. Ossolińskiego, "Silva Rerum" 1928 zeszyt 4/5
- To Aleksander Potocki, w zbiorze korespondencji z lat 1814-1822, rękopis: Archiwum Główne Akt Dawnych (Archiwum Wilanowskie, sygn. 289)
- To Stanisław Staszic, 2 letters from 1815 and 1818, ogł. A. Kraushar: Towarzystwo Warszawskie Przyjaciół Nauk t. 3, Warszawa 1902, s. 319; t. 4, Warszawa 1904, s. 330
- To S. K. Potocki, August 1819, m/s in Wilanów Palace Archive sygn. 271 ogł. M. Łodyński: Materiały do dziejów państwowej polityki bibliotecznej w Księstwie Warszawskim i Królestwie Polskim (1807-1831), Wrocław 1958 "Książka w Dawnej Kulturze Polskiej" nr 8 (s. 65)
- To Joachim Lelewel, 2 January 1821, rękopis: Biblioteka Jagiellońska, sygn. 4435 – od Lelewela z 22 maja 1821, rękopis: Biblioteka Ossolińskich, sygn. 921/II – do F. Siarczyńskiego z roku 1823, ogł. "Biblioteka Naukowa Zakładu Narodowego im. Ossolińskich" 1842, t. 1, s. 3 i następne – od F. Siarczyńskiego z roku 1823, rękopis: Ossolineum, sygn. 2193 (kopia) – korespondencja z A. Rościszewskim, rękopis: Ossolineum, sygn. 2193 (kopie)
- From Ignacy Krasicki, 5 September 1793, ogł. K. Kantecki, "Tygodnik Ilustrowany" 1877 t. 2, s. 61, przedr. w: Szkice i opowiadania, Poznań 1883, p. 377; Z. Goliński, M. Klimowicz, R. Wołoszyński w: Korespondencja Ignacego Krasickiego t. 2, Wrocław 1958
- From Tadeusz Kościuszko 1794, ogł. H. Zeissberg: Quellen zur Geschichte der deutschen Kaiserpolitik Österreichs, v. 4, Vienna 1885
- From Emperor Francis I, 1809, wydano pt. Podobizna listu własnoręcznego... cesarza Franciszka I, pisanego do..., Lwów 1851; m/s: Ossolineum, sygn. 11655/I
- "Journeys through Austria and Germany" a fragmentary journal of 2 journeys c. 1792 and after 1792, Podróże po Austrii i Niemczech,, m/s: Ossolineum, sygn. 798/I.

== Awards ==
- Knight Commander of the Order of Saint Stephen of Hungary

== Bibliography ==
- Jabłońska, Władysława. (1979) "Ossoliński Józef Kajetan (1748-1826)" Polski słownik biograficzny. Wrocław: Polska Akademia Nauk. p. 416-421. (in Polish)
