= Au roi de la bière =

Historic Monument in Paris, France

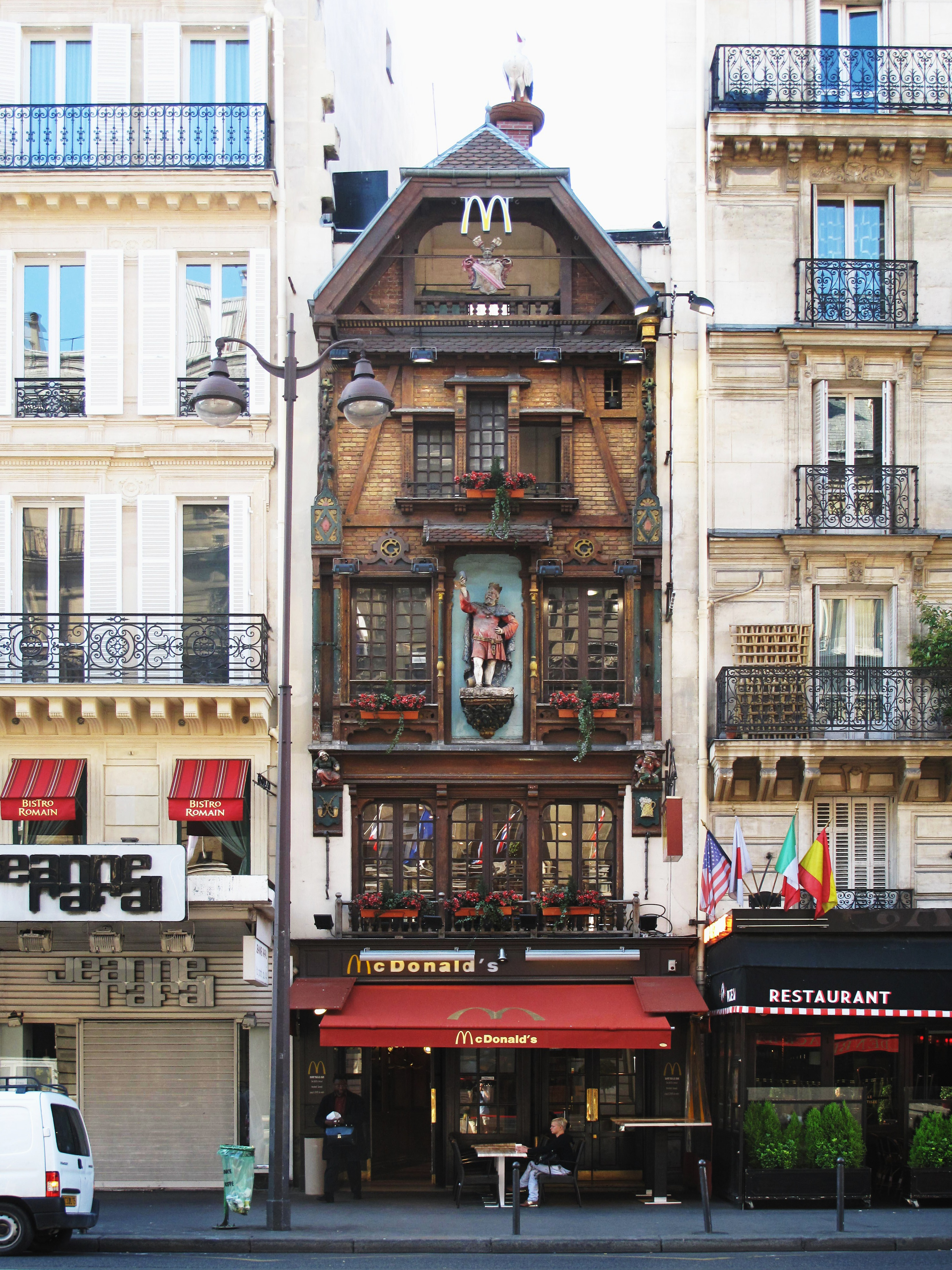
- Façade

- Location within Paris
- 48°52′31″N 2°19′32″E
- Type: Restaurant
- Location: 119 Rue Saint-Lazare; 8th arrondissement of Paris; France

History
- Built: 1892
- Rebuilt: 1894 (façade and other alterations)

Site notes
- Architect(s): Chausson; Paul Marbeau (1894 alterations)
- Architectural style: Alsatian regionalist

Monument historique
- Official name: Brasserie "Au Roi de la Bière" - Jacqueminot-Graff
- Designated: November 18, 1997
- Reference no.: PA75080001

Au roi de la bière is a former brasserie in the 8th arrondissement of Paris, France. It has been an official Historic Monument since 1997. It currently serves as a McDonald's restaurant. It is located at 119 Rue Saint-Lazare in the 8th arrondissement, near the Saint-Lazare train station.

== History ==
The original restaurant was built in 1892 by architect Chausson. In 1894, the façade was completely modified and the building was raised by architect Paul Marbeau on behalf of Alsatian restaurateur Jacqueminot Graff.

The Alsatian-style façade and the roof (including the storck and Gambrinus statues), as well as the three adjoining rooms of the ground floor, were registered as a Historic Monument on November 18, 1997. The building became a McDonald's restaurant in 1998.
