= Przylepki =

- Village
- Location within Poland
- Coordinates: 52°8′N 16°56′E
- Country: Poland
- Voivodeship: Greater Poland
- County: Śrem
- Gmina: Brodnica

Przylepki [pʂɨˈlɛpki] is a village in the administrative district of Gmina Brodnica, within Śrem County, Greater Poland Voivodeship, in west-central Poland.

== History ==
Przylepki was first documented in 1366. In 1581, it was located in the Kościan District, within the Poznań Voivodeship, Poland-Lithuania. From 1975 to 1998, Przylepki administratively belonged to Poznań Voivodeship.

== Notable residents ==
Stanisław Egbert Koźmian (1811-1885), Polish writer, poet and translator.
