= Samuel Linde =

Polish academic

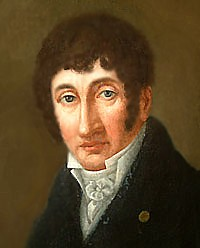
Samuel Linde

Samuel Bogumił Linde (born Samuel Gottlieb Linde; Toruń, 11 or 24 April 1771 – 8 August 1847, Warsaw) was a Polish linguist, librarian, and lexicographer of Swedish-German extraction. He was director of the Prussian-founded Warsaw Lyceum during its existence (1804–31) and an important figure in the Polish Enlightenment.

== Life ==
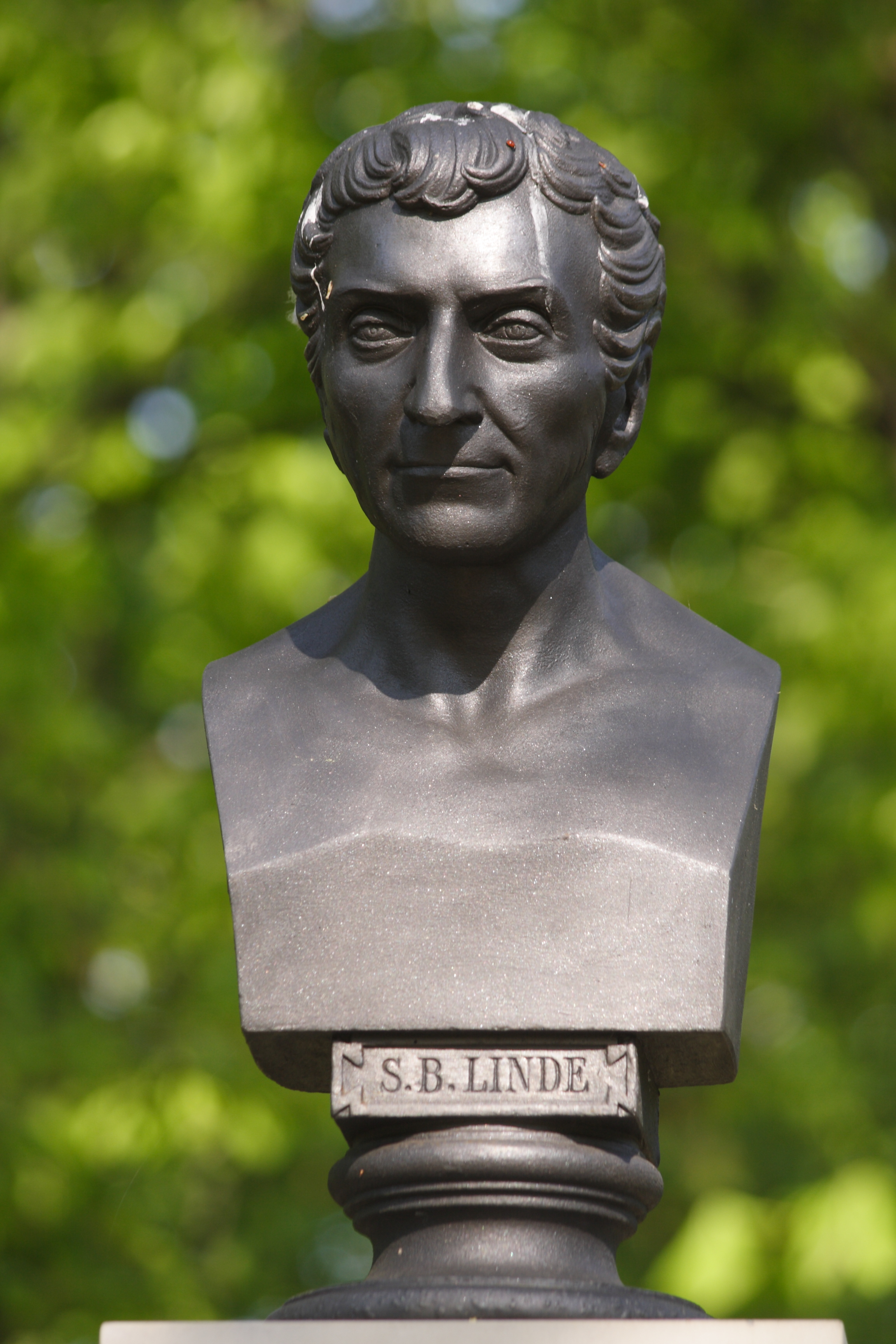
Bust of Linde in the family tomb at the Protestant cemetery in Warsaw

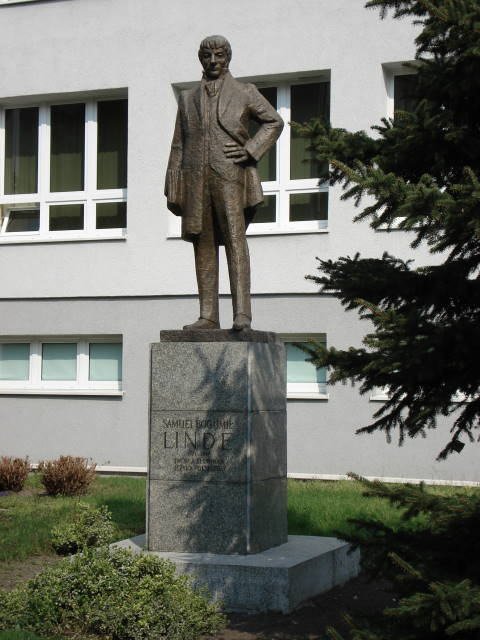
Linde monument, Toruń

Samuel Gottlieb Linde was born in Toruń, Crown of Poland, which 22 years later, after his birth, as a result of the Second Partition of Poland, became a city under the rule of the King of Prussia (Prussian Poland), to Jan Jacobsen Linde, a master locksmith and member of the city council who had immigrated from Sweden, and Anna Barbara, née Langenhann. His mother's family originated from Coburg. His second name Gottlieb has been rendered in Polish as Bogumił. Linde came from a German-speaking family but learned the Polish language in Leipzig in order to serve as a lector of Polish at University of Leipzig where he had previously studied theology and philology. In 1793 he began to collaborate with supporters of the Constitution of 3 May 1791. During the Kościuszko Uprising (1794) he was in Warsaw and supported Hugo Kołłątaj.

In 1795–1803 he was a librarian to Józef Maksymilian Ossoliński and began gathering material for his future dictionary for Polish and other Slavic grammar and expressions by traveling for six years through Galicia and to Moldova. He became director at the newly established Königlich-Preußisches Lyzäum in Warsaw, the later Warsaw Lyceum (1804–31). Linde hired Frédéric Chopin's father, Nicolas Chopin, as a teacher of French language. The composer himself studied at the Lyceum in 1823–26.

Linde was a Lutheran and he was instrumental in establishing the Lutheran community in Warsaw. He is buried at the Evangelical Cemetery of the Augsburg Confession in Warsaw. Linde married Ludwika Nussbaum, originally from Switzerland. Their daughter Ludwika Emilia Izabela married Leopold Otto, a Lutheran pastor.

== Works ==
Linde's major work was Słownik języka polskiego (Dictionary of the Polish Language), a six-volume monolingual dictionary, of lasting importance for Slavic lexicography, published in Warsaw in 1807–14. It was the first major dictionary of the Polish language. The second edition was published posthumously in Lemberg (Polish Lwów, now Lviv) in 1854–1861. Both editions are now present in several digital libraries.

== See also ==
- List of Poles
