= Leopold Otto =

Polish Lutheran pastor and activist

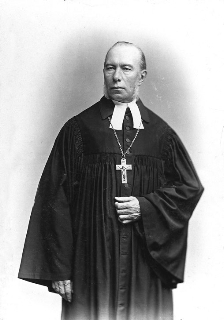
- Born: 2 November 1819; Warsaw, Congress Poland
- Died: 22 September 1882 (aged 62); Warsaw, Congress Poland
- Occupations: Lutheran pastor, national activist

Pastor Leopold v. Otto also Leopold Marcin von Otto (2 November 1819 in Warsaw – 22 September 1882 in Warsaw) was a Lutheran pastor of the German community in Warsaw and Poland and a national activist, participant of the patriotic manifestation of 1861 in Warsaw. In 1866–1875 Otto worked in Cieszyn. He published a book about the "Deutsche Evangelische Gemeinde" (German Protestant Community Zwiastun Ewangeliczny) and also wrote sermons and religious writings.

In theology, he was a supporter of Lutheran orthodoxy and starkly rejected liberal theology and rationalistic interpretation of the Bible.

His second wife was Emilia Izabela Linde (1826–1857), daughter of Samuel Linde, Polish linguist.

== Works ==
- Beitrag zur Geschichte der Evangelisch-Augsburgischen Gemeinde zu Warschau, Druck bei A Gins, Warschau 1882
- Rozmyślania i kazania (1887)
- Dra ks Leopolda Marcina Otto rozmyślania i kazania (1887)
- Postyla, czyli Wykład ewangelij i listów na wszystkie niedziele i święta uroczyste roku kościelnego (1892)
- Wykład Objawienia św. Jana (1904)
- Mniejszy katechizm Marcina Lutra Doktora św. Teologji (1916)
