= Warsaw Lyceum =

19th century Polish secondary school

Coordinates: 52°14′26″N 21°01′13″E

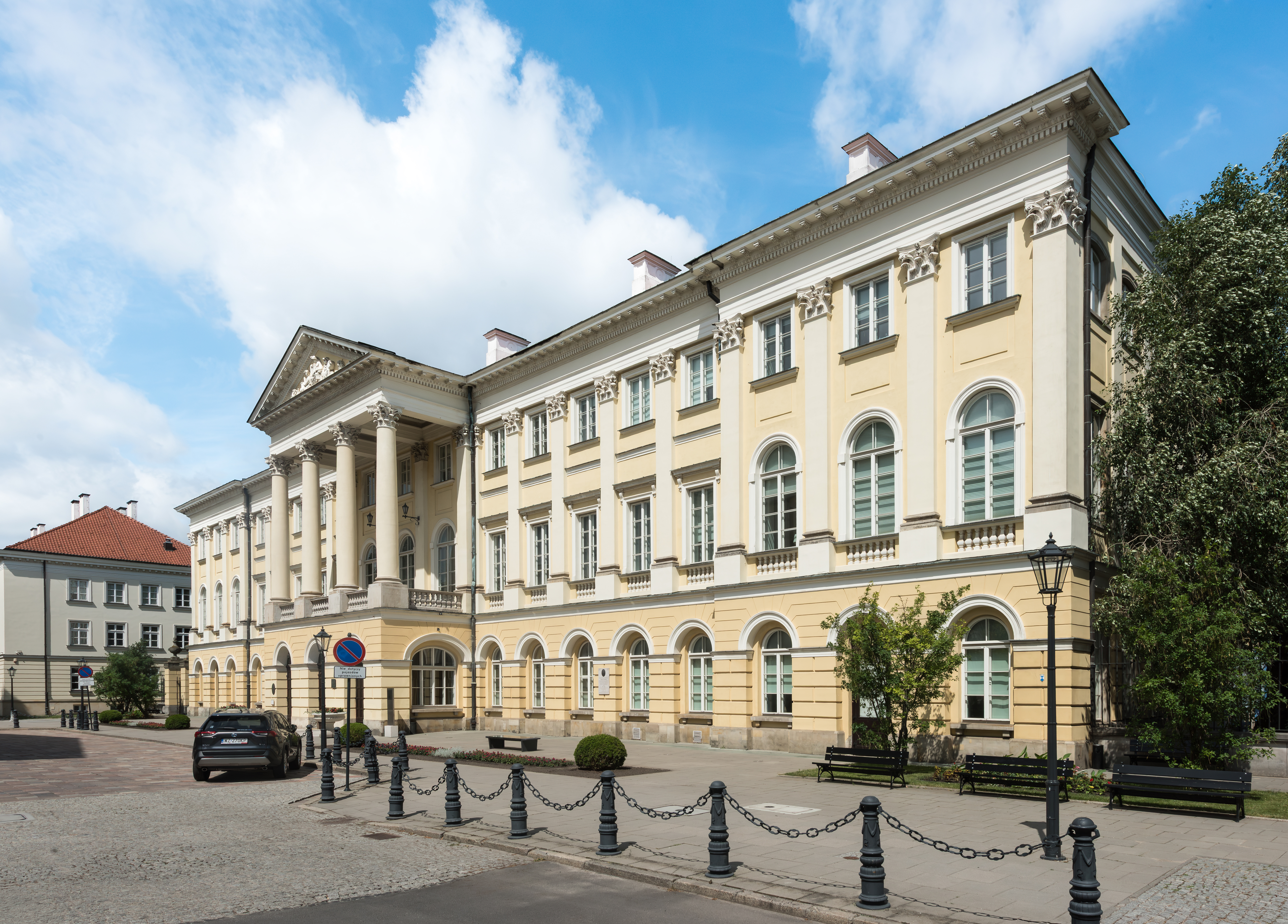
Kazimierz Palace, 2026

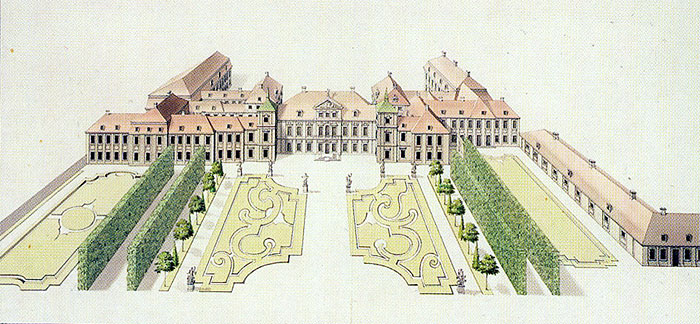
Saxon Palace in 1765, before its 1842 remodeling

The Warsaw Lyceum (Polish: Liceum Warszawskie; German: Königlich-Preußisches Lyzäum zu Warschau) was a secondary school that existed in Warsaw, under the Kingdom of Prussia and under the Kingdom of Poland, from 1804 to its closing in 1831 by Imperial Russia following the Polish November 1830 Uprising.

== History ==
The Warsaw Lyceum was founded in 1804 by the Kingdom of Prussia as a German language school in Warsaw, which had become part of New East Prussia following the 1795 Third Partition of the Polish-Lithuanian Commonwealth.

In the Second Partition of the Polish-Lithuanian Commonwealth (1793), Prussia had acquired South Prussia, and had established a branch of its Cadet Corps schools in Kalisch. In 1804, in Warsaw, a humanistic secondary school for boys was opened, divided according to the Prussian educational model into six classes, plus two preparatory ones. In German, it taught Latin, Greek, German and French, philosophy, ethics, mathematics and natural sciences, and (in Polish) the Polish language.

Samuel Linde was appointed director of the Warsaw Lyceum. The Evangelical-Augsburg Lutheran from Thorn in Royal Prussia had studied theology and philology at the University of Leipzig and had taught the Polish language there. From 1795 he had been librarian to Józef Maksymilian Ossoliński, and had gathered material for his future Słownik języka polskiego (Dictionary of the Polish Language), a six-volume monolingual dictionary which he published in Warsaw in 1807–14. Linde faced difficulties in organizing the school, and with Prussian authorities who insisted on German as the language of instruction.

Following Napoleon's victory over Prussia, in 1807 Warsaw became the capital of the Duchy of Warsaw. With Linde continuing as the Lyceum's director, the school was now modeled after the French system, while Polish replaced German as the primary language of instruction at the Liceum Warszawskie (Warsaw Lyceum).

The school was initially located in the leased north wing of the Saxon Palace, named after and owned by the German House of Wettin. Two Wettin Electors of Saxony had been kings of Poland between 1697 and 1763, and a third Saxon ruled the Duchy of Warsaw from 1807 until Napoleon's defeat in 1814.

One of the teachers of French language was, from October 1810, Nicolas Chopin, father of Frédéric Chopin. The young composer was one of the Lyceum's most famous pupils, beginning his studies there in the autumn of 1823.

Samuel Linde remained the Lyceum's director when the city, in 1815, came under Russian control as part of the Kingdom of Poland.

In 1817 the Saxon Palace was requisitioned for military use, and the Lyceum was moved to the Kazimierz Palace. The latter had, until 1795, hosted the Warsaw Corps of Cadets, and in 1816 had been made the home of the newly established University of Warsaw. (The Kazimierz Palace currently houses the Warsaw University rectorate.)

When the November 1830 Uprising was suppressed in 1831, the Russian Empire regained control of Warsaw, and the Warsaw Lyceum was closed.

== Alumni ==
- Frédéric Chopin
- Julian Fontana
- Tytus Woyciechowski
- Jan Matuszyński
- Kajetan Garbiński
- Stefan Garczyński
- Oskar Kolberg
- Stanisław Egbert Koźmian
- Aleksander Albert Krajewski
- Zygmunt Krasiński
- Leopold Kronenberg
- Juliusz Konstanty Ordon
- Kazimierz Woyda
