= Jan Matuszyński =

Polish doctor (1808–1842)

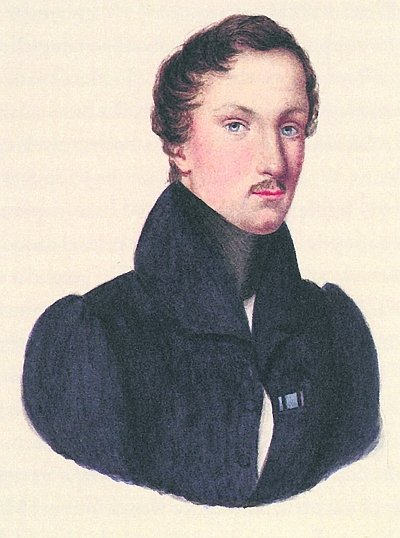
Miniature of Jan Matuszyński, ca. 1840

Jan Edward Aleksander Matuszyński (Warsaw, 14 December 1808 – 20 April 1842, Paris) was a Polish medical doctor and close friend, in Warsaw and Paris, of Polish composer Frédéric Chopin.

== Life ==
Jan Matuszyński's father, Jan Fryderyk Matuszyński (1768–1831), was a physician, a surgeon, and head of Warsaw's Lutheran Hospital.

Jan Matuszyński, a native of Warsaw, befriended Chopin whilst attending the Warsaw Lyceum, where he was taught by Chopin's father, Nicolas Chopin. Matuszyński came from a musical family; he himself played the flute, and his brother Leopold (1820–93) became an opera tenor and director.

From 1827 Matuszyński studied medicine at the University of Warsaw. During the November 1830–31 Uprising he served as a medic with the Polish forces, in the 5th Mounted Rifles, and won the order of Virtuti Militari.

Following the suppression of the Uprising he went into exile in Germany, eventually graduating in medicine at the University of Tübingen.

Emigrating to Paris in 1834, he, for more than two years, shared Chopin's apartment in the Chaussée d'Antin and gave him medical advice.

He took a further medical degree in Paris, specializing in physiology, and married a Frenchwoman, Caroline Boquet.

In 1837 he published a treatise, De l'influence du nerf sympathique sur les fonctions des sens (On the Influence of the Sympathetic Nervous System on the Functions of the Senses).

Matuszyński died of tuberculosis. In his last days, Chopin and George Sand cared for him at the rooms they shared in the rue Pigalle. Sand wrote that he "died in our arms after a slow and cruel agony, which caused Chopin as much suffering as if it had been his own. He [Chopin] was strong, courageous and devoted... but when it was over he was shattered."

Matuszyński was buried in the Cemetery of Montmartre.
