= Jan Koźmian =

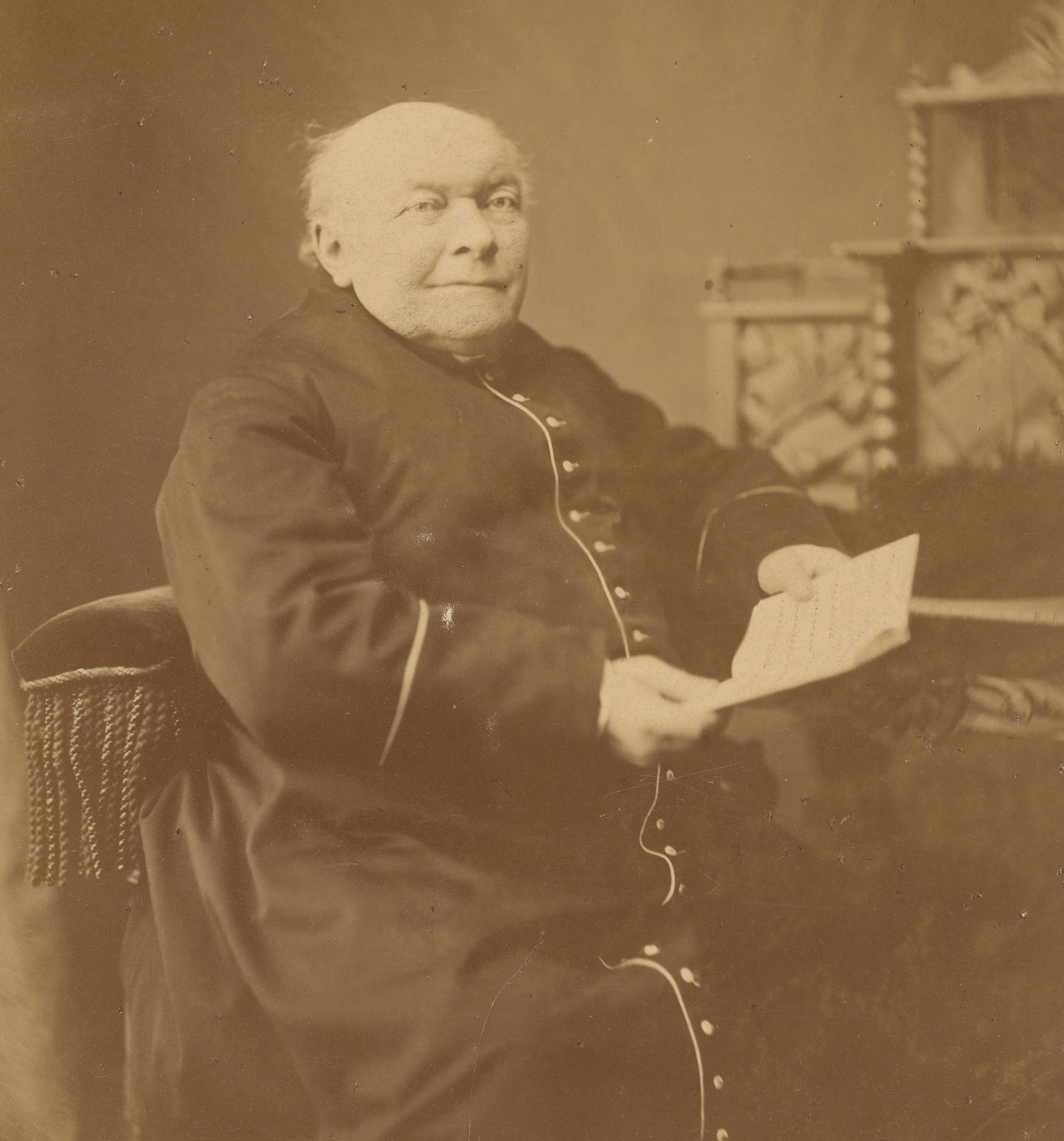
Ks. Jan Koźmian in 1875

Jan Koźmian (1812–1877) was a Polish literary figure, and a Roman Catholic priest after the death of his wife.

He founded and wrote for upwards of twenty years in the "Posen Review". He and his brother Stanislaus Kozmian were the first secular workers for the revival of Catholic convictions in Poland. They both took part in the Polish insurrection of 1831, and subsequently went into exile. Jan lived in France, before returning to Posen.

== Works ==
His articles have been collected in three volumes (1881). The programme of the Review stated "That she may fulfil her mission, Poland must be united to the Church". Noteworthy are "The Two Idolatries", on Revolutionism and Panslavism, and his last essay, "Duties are permanent."

He also wrote about Italian affairs and in favor of the temporal power of the Papacy. In a controversial essay he attacked the Jesuit Ivan Gagarin, who maintained that the great obstacle to the conversion of the Russians was that they identified Catholicism and Poland.
