= Wola Mielecka =

- Village
- Location within Poland
- Coordinates: 50°17′N 21°22′E
- Country: Poland
- Voivodeship: Subcarpathian
- County: Mielec
- Gmina: Mielec
- Population: 1,823
- Website: https://www.wolamielecka.pl

Wola Mielecka [ˈvɔla mjɛˈlɛt͡ska] is a village in the administrative district of Gmina Mielec, within Mielec County, Subcarpathian Voivodeship, in south-eastern Poland.
