= Rue Saint-Lazare =

Street in Paris, France

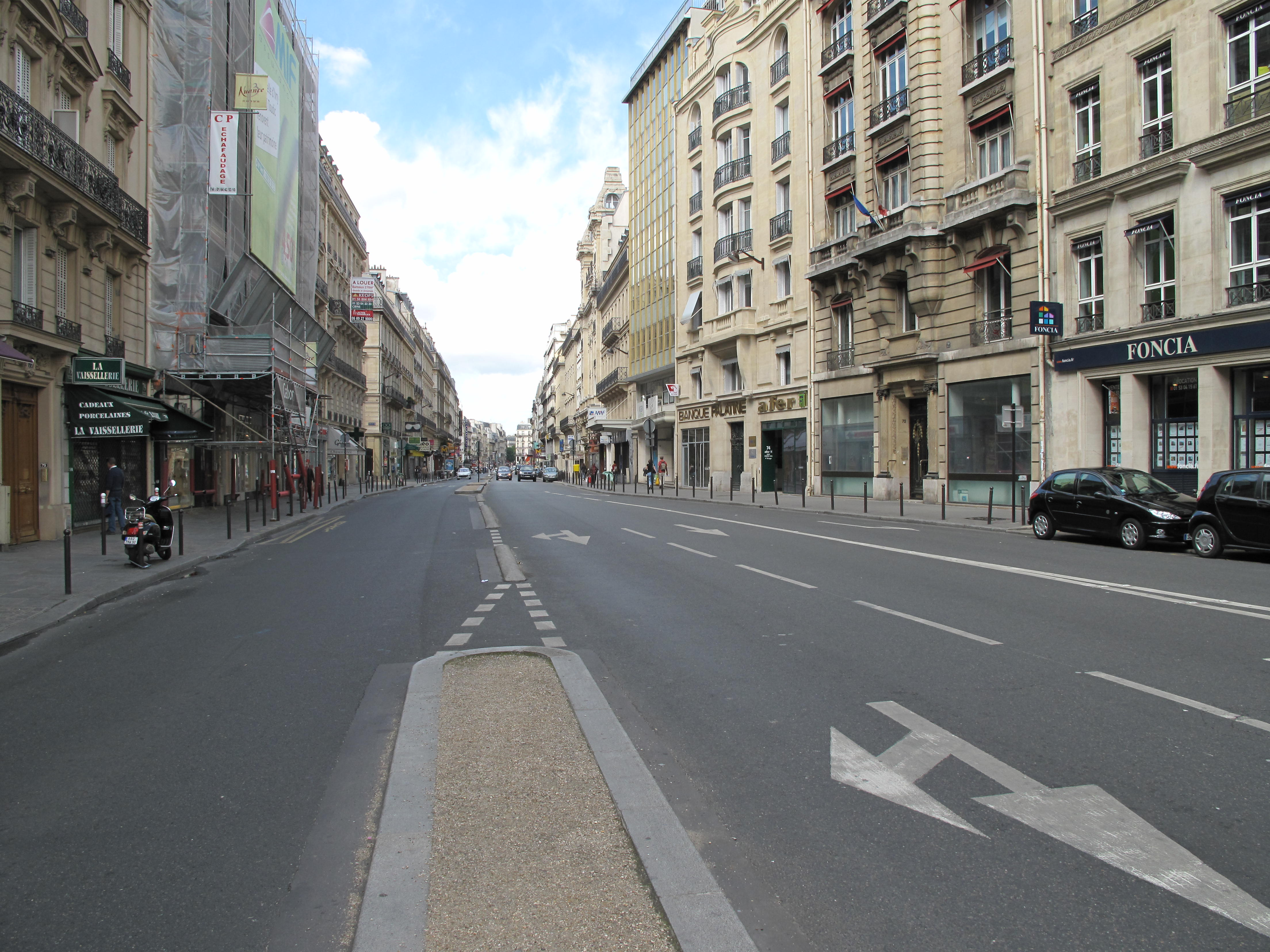

- Location within Paris
- Length: 1,066 m (3,497 ft)
- Width: 11 to 36 m (36 to 118 ft)
- Arrondissement: 8th, 9th
- Quarter: Porcheron
- Coordinates: 48.876062°N 2.330426°E
- From: 9 rue Bourdaloue and 1 rue Notre-Dame-de-Lorette
- To: Place Gabriel-Péri and Rue de Rome

Construction
- Completion: 17th century
- Denomination: 1770

The Rue Saint-Lazare (French pronunciation: [ʁy sɛ̃ lazaʁ]) is a street in the 8th and 9th arrondissements of Paris, France. It starts at 9 Rue Bourdaloue and 1 Rue Notre-Dame-de-Lorette, and ends at the Place Gabriel-Péri and the Rue de Rome. (Note: The Rue Saint-Lazare once continued to the Rue du Rocher and the Rue de l'Arcade.)

== History ==
This street already existed in 1700 under the name of Rue des Porcherons or Rue d'Argenteuil, and connected the villages of Roule and Ville-L’Évêque to the village of Porcherons. In 1734, it was still only lined with few buildings. The present name dates from 1770 and comes from the Maison Saint-Lazare toward which it led (via the rues Lamartine, Bleue, and Paradis) and which had been used as a leprosarium since the Middle Ages; it was converted into Saint-Lazare Prison in 1793. It stood at the current location of no. 117 rue du Faubourg-Saint-Denis, in the 10th arrondissement.

A ministerial decision of 12 Fructidor V (29 August 1797) set the minimum width of the street at 10 metres (33 ft). This width was increased to 11 metres (36 ft) by a royal decree of 3 August 1838. An order of 3 September 1843 declared the public utility of expansion to 20 metres (66 ft) to the right of the properties at nos. 115–121 to create the Cour du Havre.

The Gare Saint-Lazare was built in 1837. An alley, the Impasse Bony, created in 1826 and located at the site of the Hotel Terminus, was used for unloading luggage. The Cour de Rome, in front of the station on the west side, encompassed the old Impasse d’Argenteuil, which opened onto the Rue du Rocher.

== Notable buildings ==
- Nos. 27–29 (and nos. 32–34, Rue de Châteaudun): Two notable buildings, decorated in the style of 16th-century French architecture, built around 1840. Probably one of the most important collections of this style. The rear facades are visible from the Rue de Châteaudun, whose extension in 1862 appears to have cut these buildings off from their garden.
- No. 54: Société anonyme des anciens établissements Boey & Borsu, a manufacturer of narrow gauge rail material with a workshop in Bonneuil-sur-Marne.
- No. 58: Hotel Delaroche built in 1829 in the Tuscan style for the painter Paul Delaroche who lived there 10 years. The colors of the recent restoration claim to reproduce the original polychrome appearance.
- No. 60 : Parisian home of the Duke of Bassano, where he and his wife died.
- No. 66 : Émile Zola bought an apartment there, where he installed his mistress Jeanne Rozerot.
- No. 82 : Headquarters of publisher Editions Flammarion since July 2022; building constructed in 1908.
- No. 87: Avenue du Coq: site of the former castle of the Porcheron family (13th century), which gave its name to the district. Later, it became the property of the Le Cocq family, and gave its name to the impasse which was built in its place.
- No. 88: Hotel built for the PLM railway company in 1869, replacing the office of the Bridges and Highways department, built in 1788 by architect François-Nicolas Hole, aka Henry. From 1938 to 1999, it was the headquarters of the SNCF.
- No. 108: Hotel Concorde Opéra Paris, former Grand Hotel Terminus of the Gare Saint-Lazare, designed by architect Juste Lisch to welcome visitors to the Exposition Universelle (1889).
- Nos. 113–115: Brasserie Mollard: The interior, dated 1894, is by the architect Édouard Niermans. The ceramic tables are by M. Simas.
- No. 119: A fast food institution to teach McDonald's employees replaced a Bavarian tavern Au roi de la bière, with a sign dating it to 1910, whose original façade has been preserved.
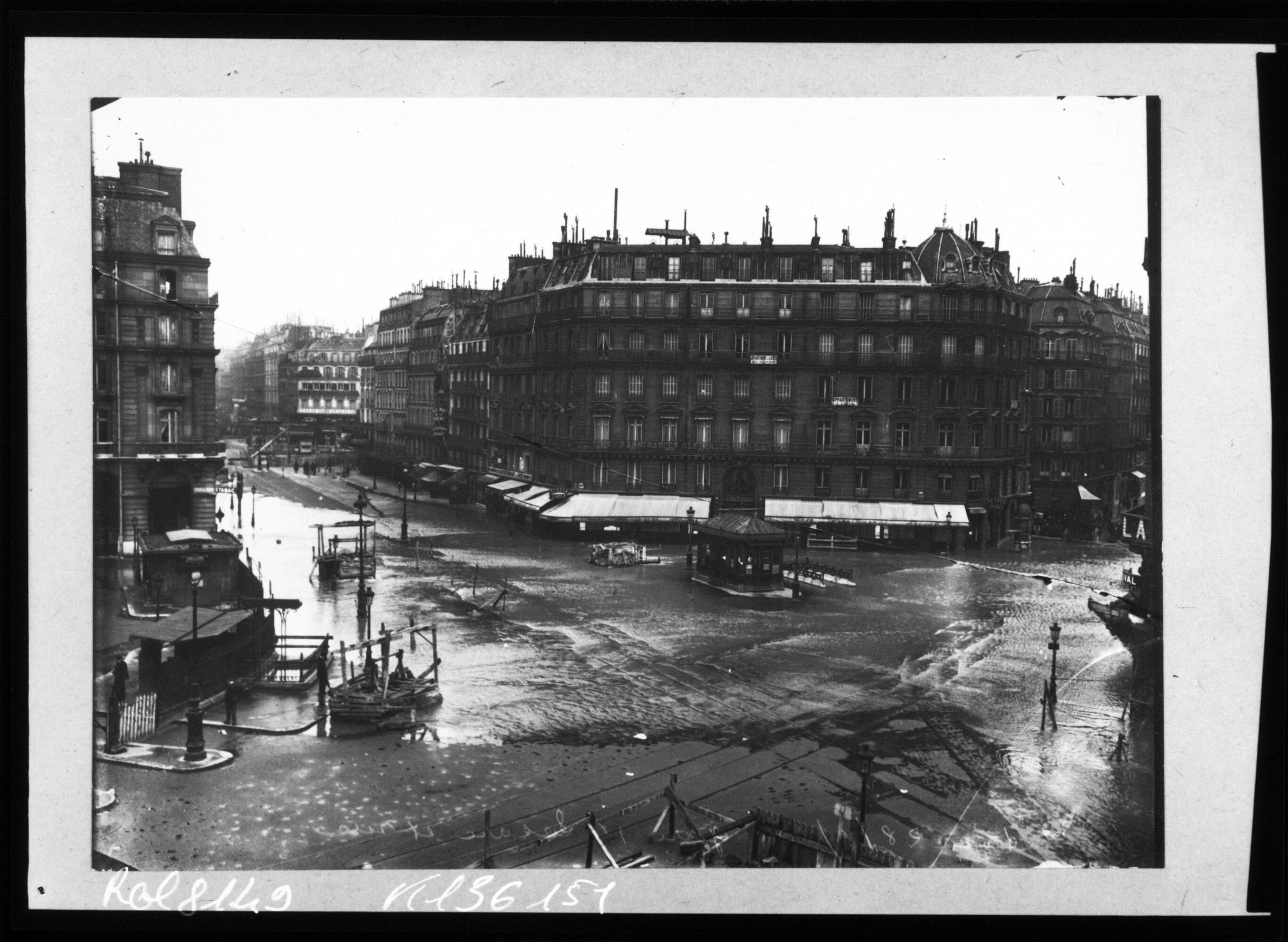
The Great Flood of Paris in January 1910. Looking to the Rue Saint-Lazare from the Square Gabriel Péri. The railway station Paris Saint-Lazare is on the left.

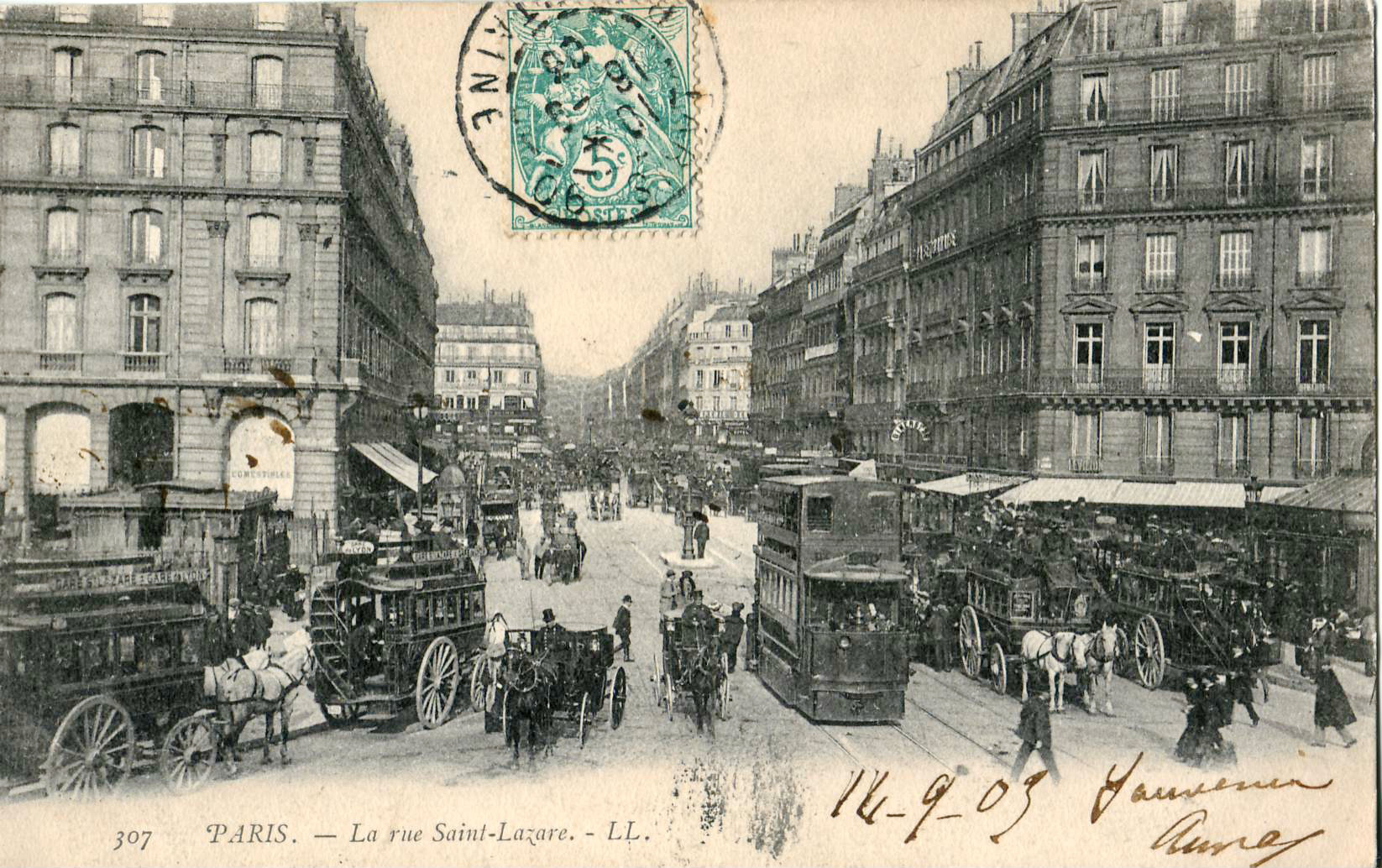
The Rue Saint-Lazare at the start of the 20th century already had heavy traffic of buses and compressed air trams.

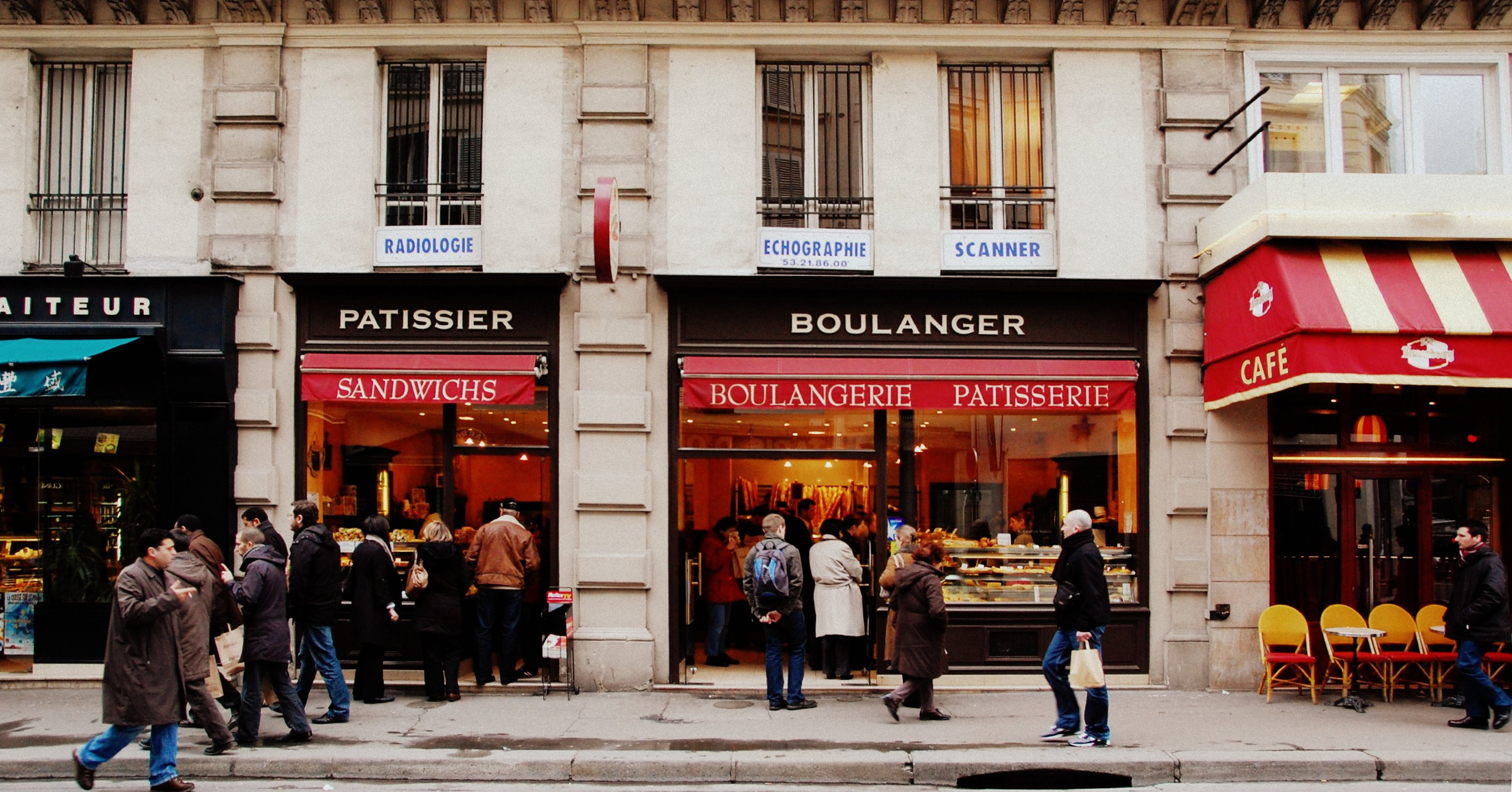
A bakery on the Rue Saint-Lazare, 2009

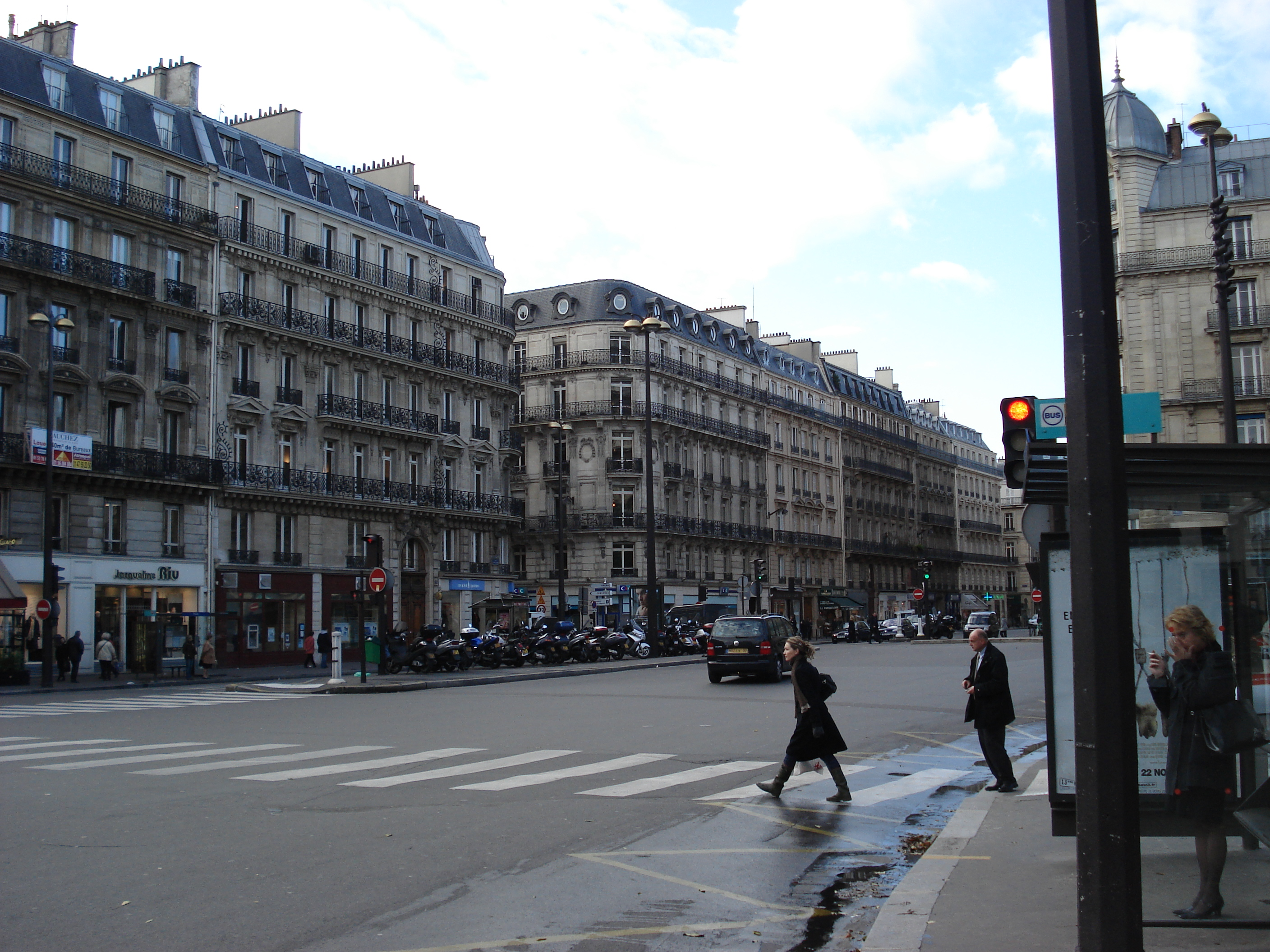
Near the Église de la Sainte-Trinité, 2006

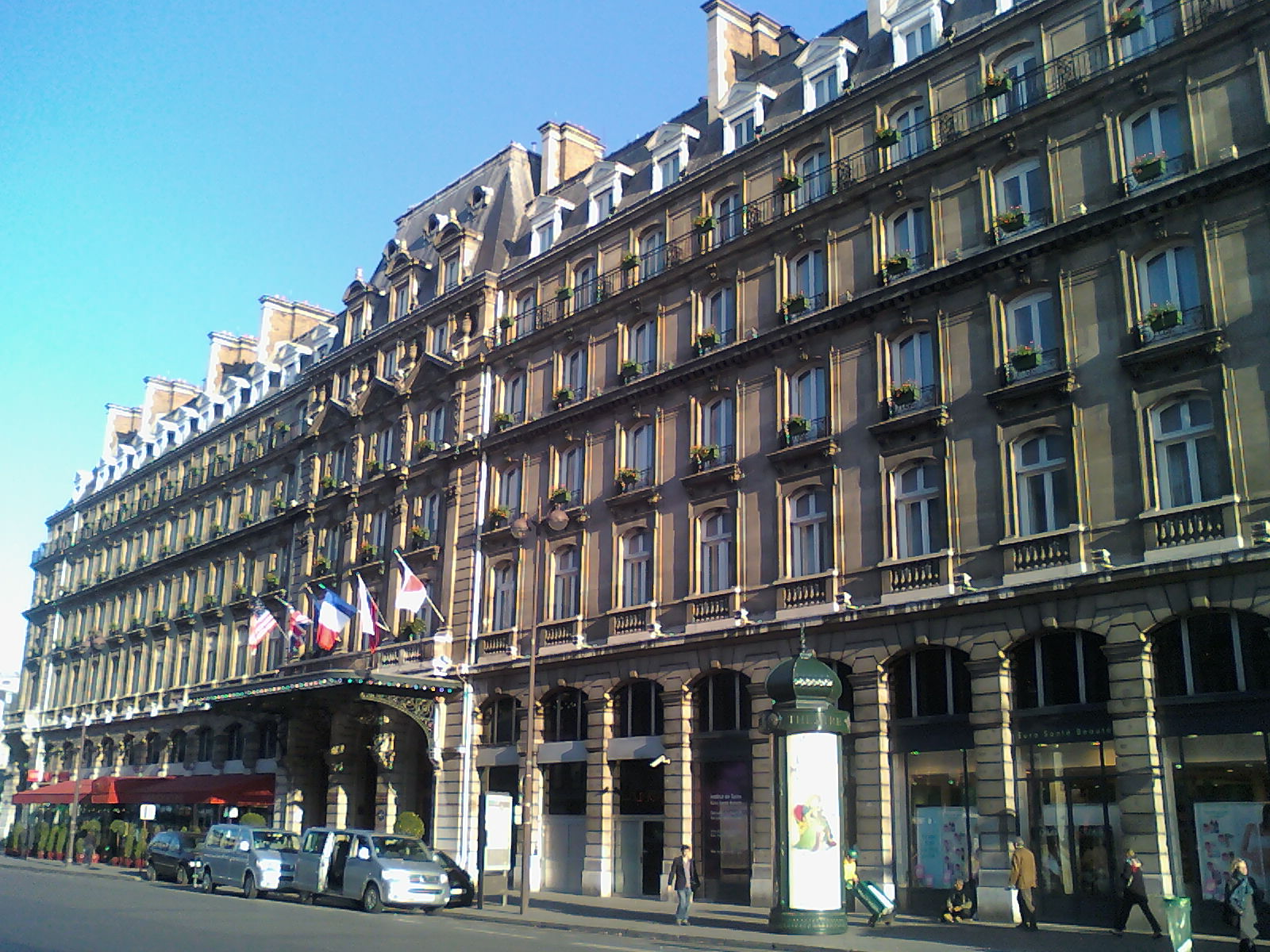
Former Grand Hôtel Terminus, now Hôtel Concorde-Saint-Lazare
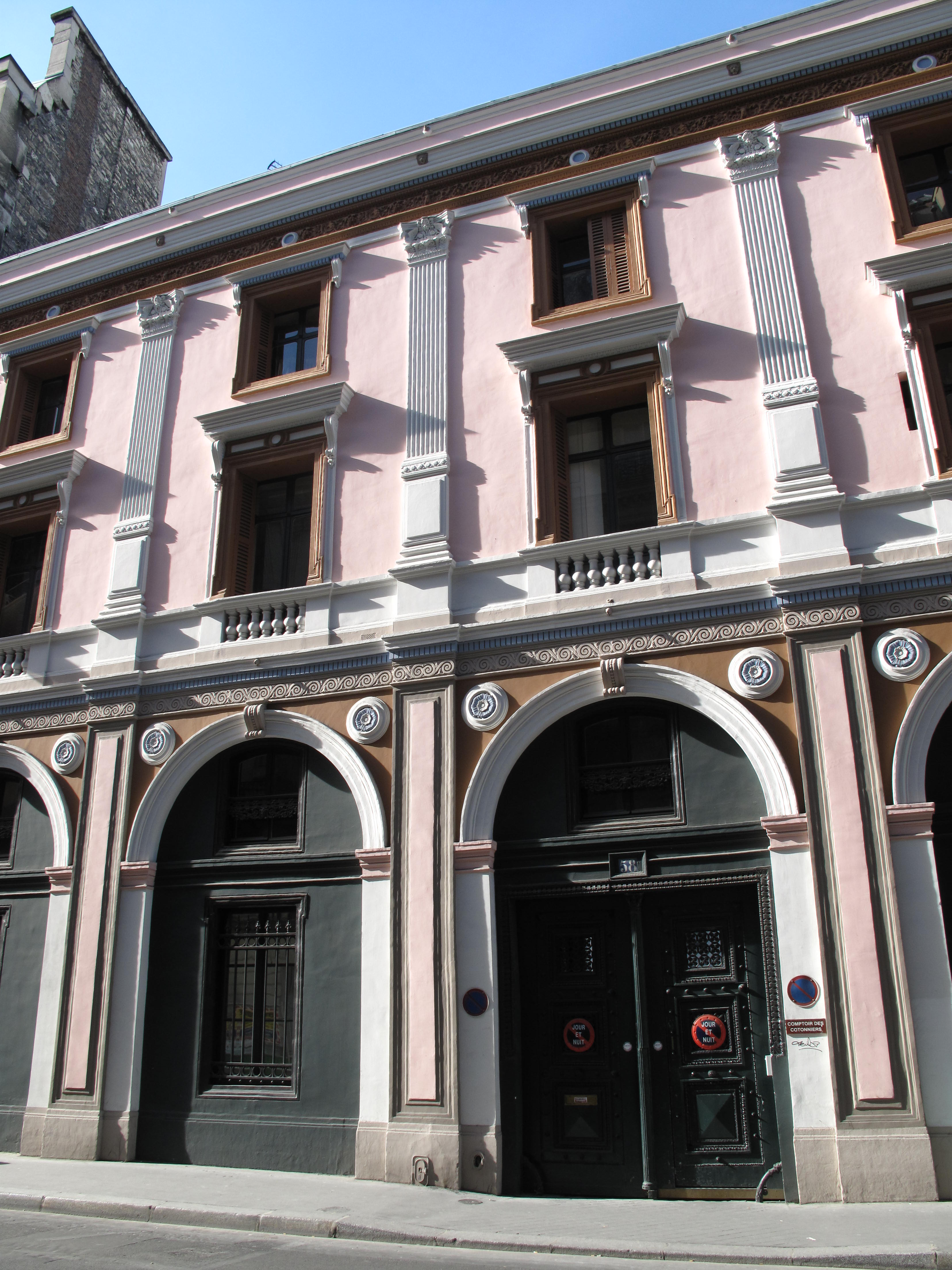
No. 58: Hotel Delaroche

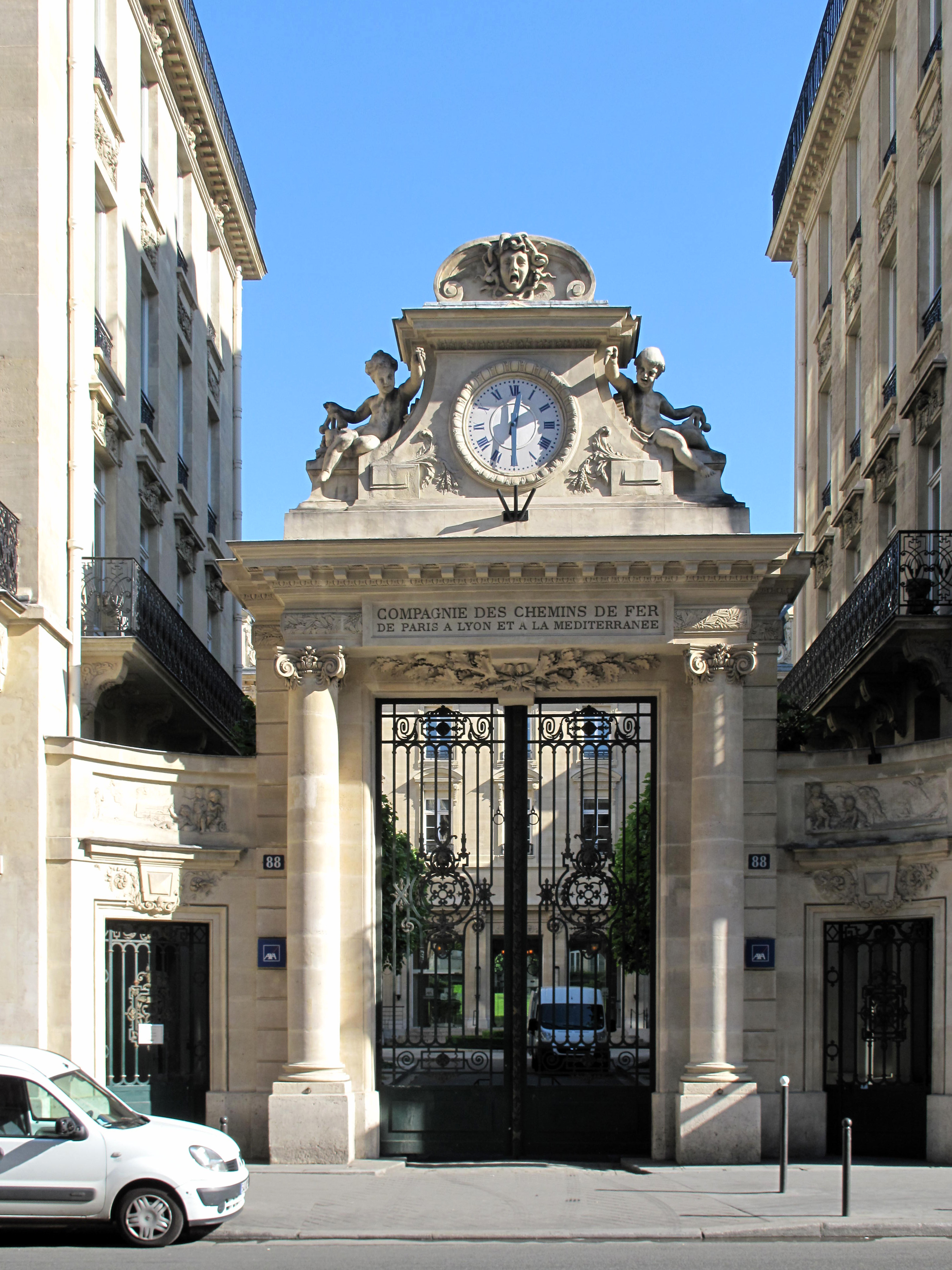
No. 88: Former SNCF headquarters

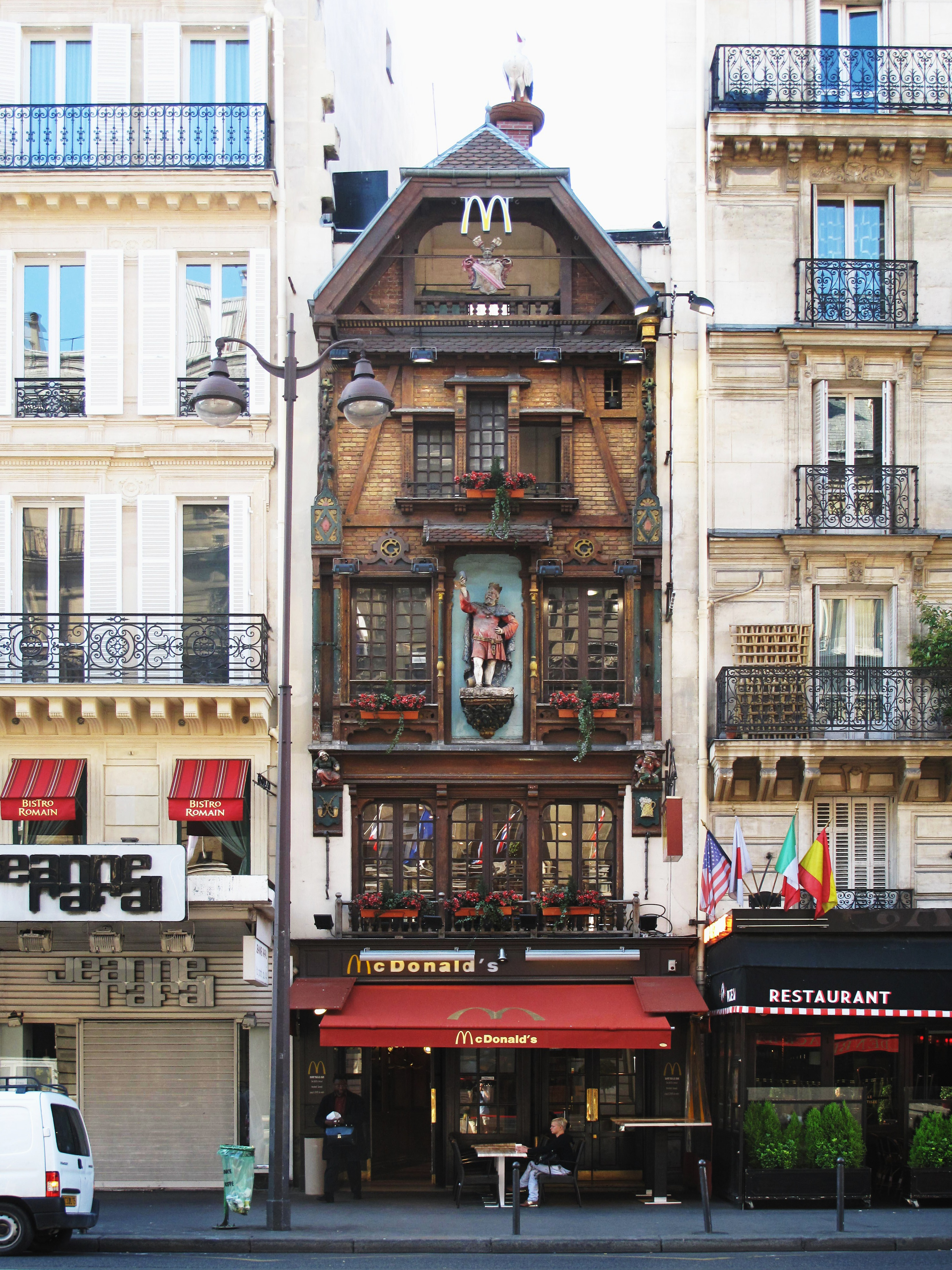
No. 119: Au roi de la bière
