= Wronów, Lublin County =

Wronów
- Village
- Location within Poland
- Coordinates: 51°10′N 22°9′E
- Country: Poland
- Voivodeship: Lublin
- County: Lublin
- Gmina: Bełżyce

Wronów [ˈvrɔnuf] is a village in the administrative district of Gmina Bełżyce, within Lublin County, Lublin Voivodeship, in eastern Poland.
