= Anna Szaniawska =

Polish noblewoman (1730–1795)

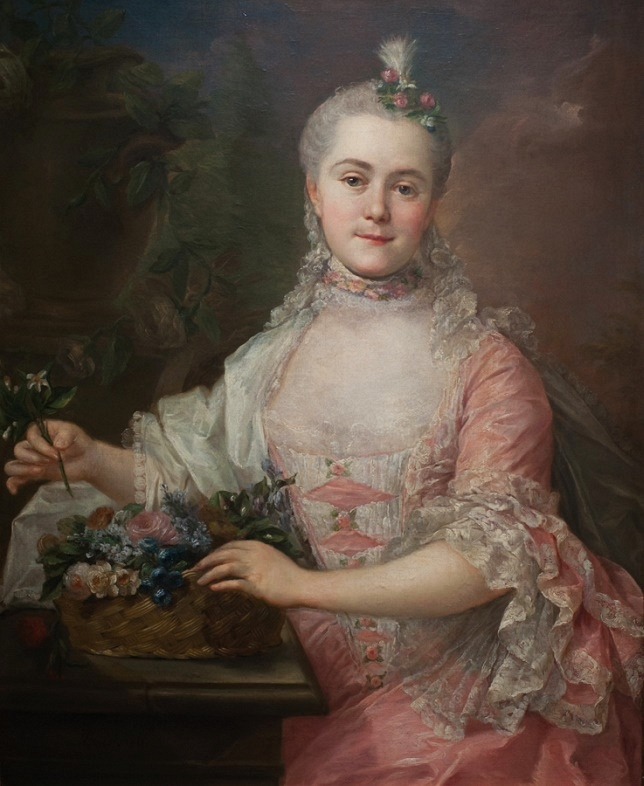
Bacciarelli Anna Szaniawska

Anna Szaniawska (1730–1795) was a Polish noblewoman. She was a close friend of the king's sister Izabella Poniatowska and a prominent salonnière in Polish high society. She was also a Freemason and a known philanthropist.
