= Despréaux =

Despréaux (pronounced [depʁeo]) is a French surname. People with that name include:

- Claude-Jean-François Despréaux (1740s–1794), French violinist and revolutionary
- Jean-Étienne Despréaux (1748–1820), French ballet master
- Nicolas Boileau-Despréaux (1636–1711), French poet and critic

== See also ==
- The Tale of Despereaux
