= Marie-Madeleine Guimard =

French ballerina

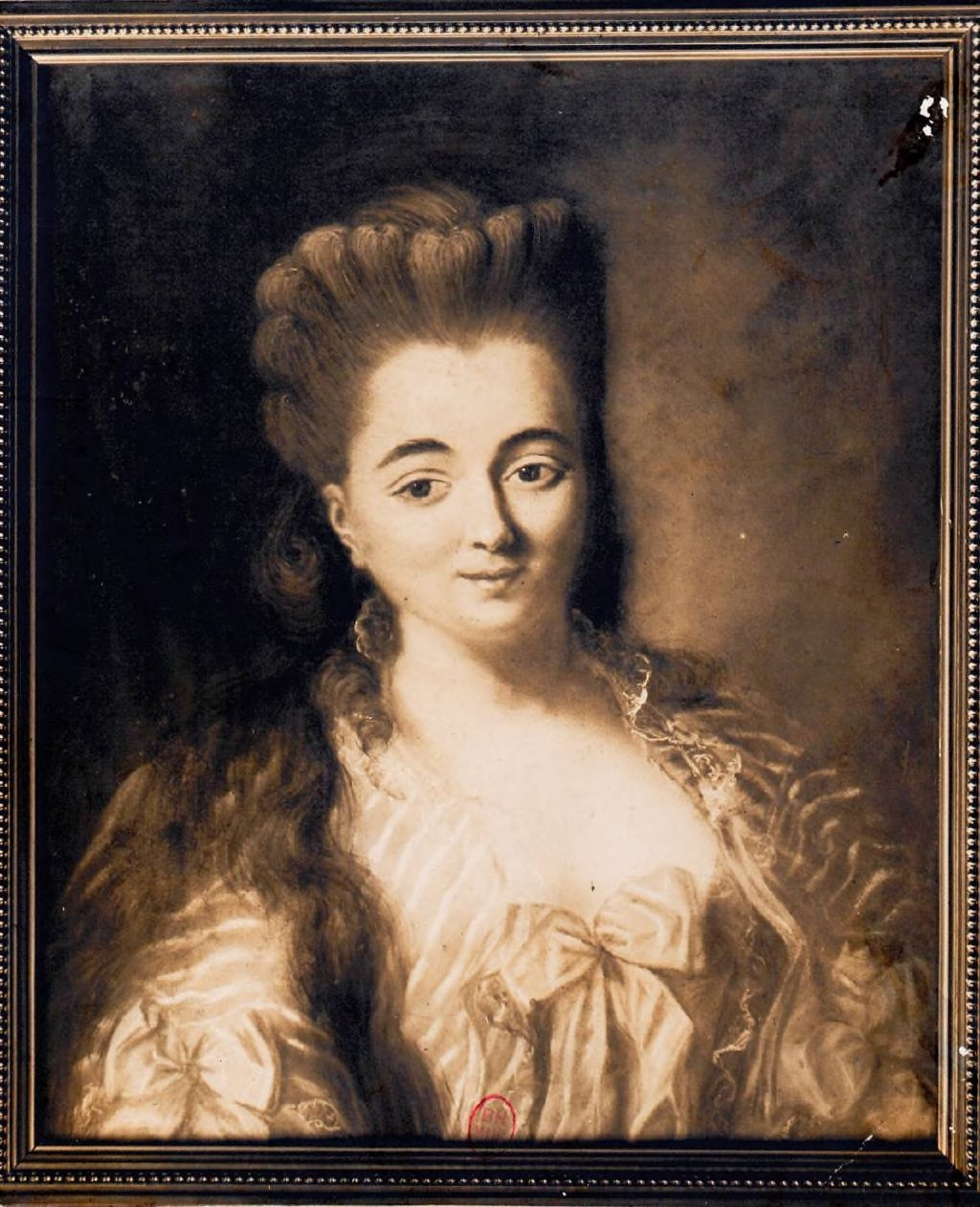
- Portrait of Guimard
- Born: 27 December 1743; Paris, Kingdom of France
- Died: 4 May 1816 (aged 72); Paris, France
- Spouse: Jean-Étienne Despréaux (m. 1789)
- Partners: Leger; Jean-Benjamin de La Borde; Charles de Rohan
- Children: 2

Marie-Madeleine Guimard (French pronunciation: [maʁi madlɛn ɡimaʁ]; 27 December 1743 — 4 May 1816) was a French ballerina who dominated the Parisian stage during the reign of Louis XVI. For twenty-five years she was the star of the Paris Opera. She made herself even more famous by her love affairs, especially by her long liaison with the Prince of Soubise. According to Edmond de Goncourt, when d'Alembert was asked why dancers like La Guimard made such prodigious fortunes, when singers did not, he responded, "It is a necessary consequence of the laws of motion".

== Biography ==
She was the love child of Fabien Guimart and Anne Bernard, and was legitimised at a late date (December 1765).

=== Dancer ===
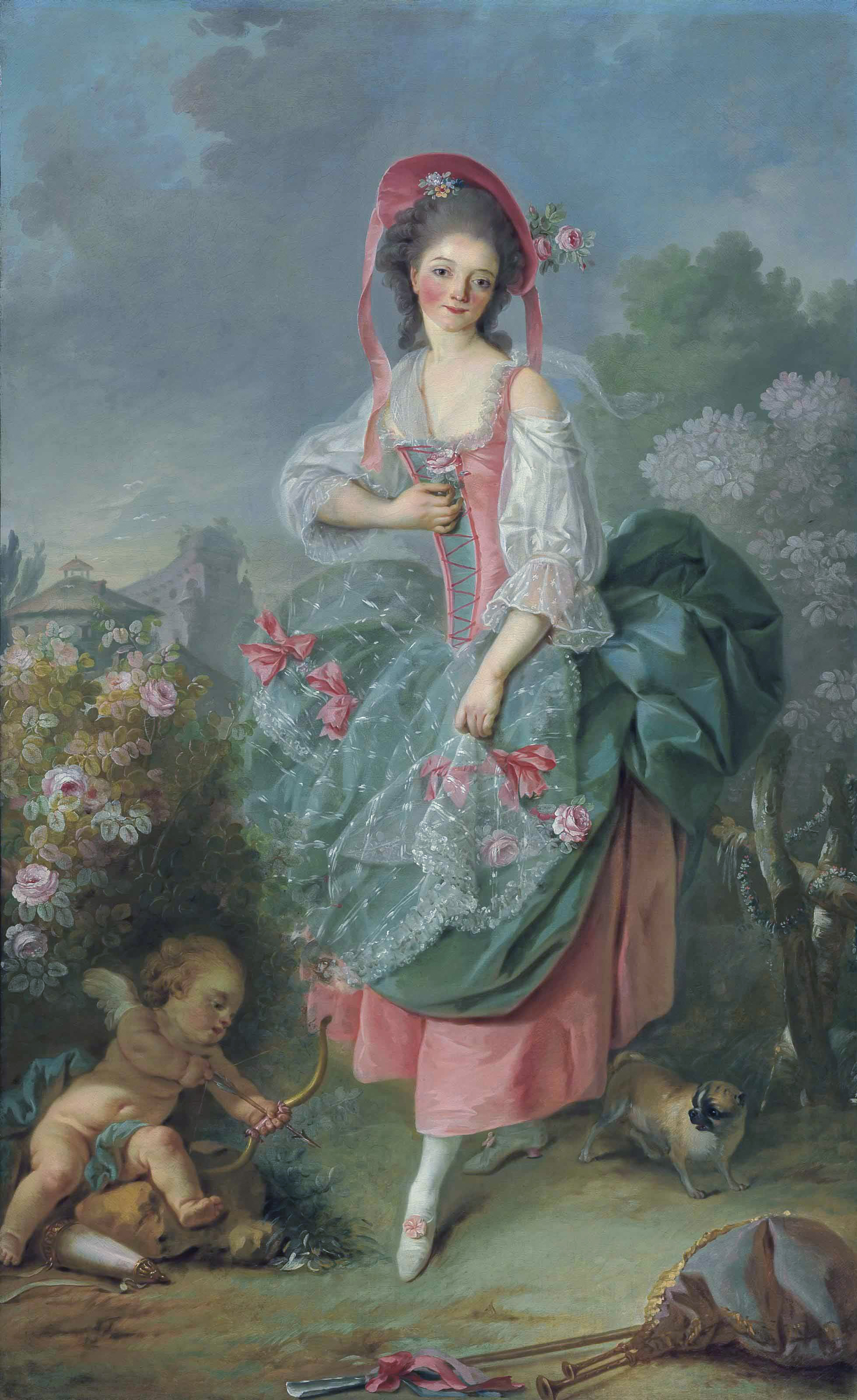
Mademoiselle Guimard as Terpsichore (Jacques-Louis David, 1773-1775)

She was trained by the great choreographer d'Harnoncourt, who had entered her at the age of fifteen among the corps de ballet of the Comédie-Française.

After a first affair with the dancer Leger, which produced a child, she was engaged at the Opéra (1761) and made her debut, as Terpsichoré, 9 May 1762, and soon was seen dancing at Court.

Not known for hazarding the more difficult movements that were being added to the professional repertory of ballet, she was renowned for her perfectly composed and fluid aristocratic movements, her mime and above all for her expressively smiling visage. She wore her skirt hitched up to reveal an underskirt, without hoops or paniers, held out simply by a starched muslin petticoat. The portrait painter Mme Vigée-Lebrun said, "her dancing was but a sketch; she made only petits pas, simple steps, but with movements so graceful that the public preferred her to every other dancer." Other dancers, like Jean-Georges Noverre, praised her enthusiastically, but Sophie Arnould, who thought that she had more graceful gesture than true dancing talent, remarked, after a piece of scenery fell and broke her arm in January 1766, after which she continued to make public appearances gamely, her arm in a sling, "Poor Guimard! if she had only broken a leg! that would not have kept her from dancing."

=== Courtesan ===
Aside from her career as a dancer, she has been famed for her love life as well as for her life as a courtesan. She was kept by a stream of highly placed admirers, including the gentleman composer Jean-Benjamin de La Borde, with whom she had a daughter in April 1763, and who always remained in her circle, even after she was finally taken up by Charles de Rohan, Prince de Soubise, a maréchal de France and great connoisseur of ballet dancers, who settled on her, it was said, 2000 écus a month.

=== House at Pantin ===
In a career of hitherto unequaled luxury, she bought a magnificent house near Paris at Pantin, and built a small private theater connected with it, where Collé's Partie de chasse de Henri IV which was prohibited in public, most of the Proverbes of Carmontelle and similar licentious performances were given to the delight of high society.

In truth there were three dinner parties a week, according to Edmond de Goncourt, one for the grandest of grands seigneurs and those of the highest consideration at Court; a second composed of writers and artists and wits that all but rivaled the salon of Mme Geoffrin; and a third to which were invited all the most ravishing and lascivious young women, according to the Mémoires secrets attributed to Bachaumont.

At the same time, according to Baron Grimm, during a bitter cold spell in January 1768, she asked for her allowance in coins, and, without taking an entourage, climbed to all the garrets of her neighborhood at Pantin, giving purses of money, coats and warm bedclothes. Throughout her career, her open-hearted generosity disarmed the pamphleteers.

Among her admirers was Louis-Sextius de Jarente de La Bruyère, bishop of Orléans.

=== Hôtel Guimard ===
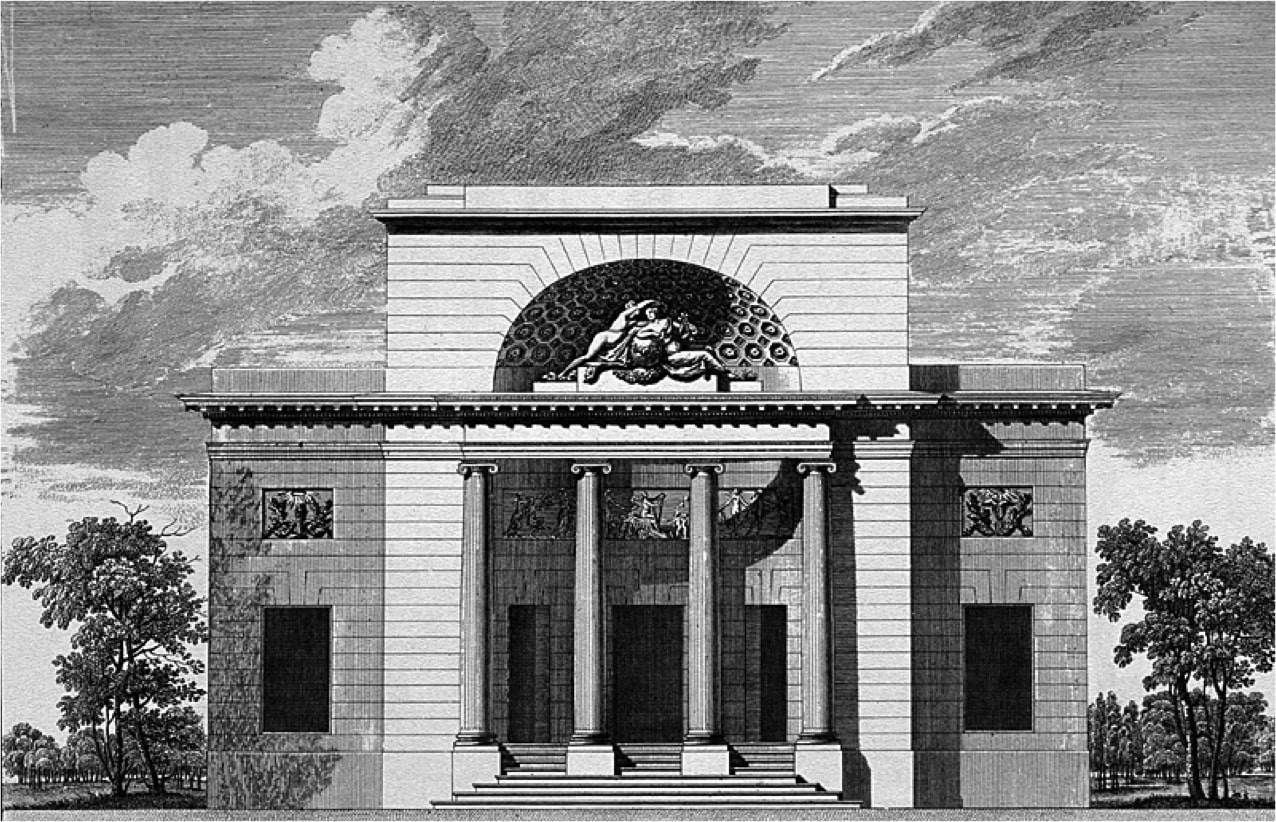
Hôtel Guimard, by Ledoux, designed ca. 1766

In the early 1770s, in defiance of the Roman Catholic Archbishop of Paris, she opened the gorgeous hôtel Guimard in the Chaussée d'Antin designed by Claude-Nicolas Ledoux in the latest neoclassical taste, decorated with paintings by Fragonard, and with a theater seating five hundred spectators. The house was almost finished March 1773 when Grimm's Correspondance littéraire reported the famous anecdote of Fragonard's revenge: La Guimard had quarreled with the painter, who had depicted her as Terpsichore in large panels of her salon, and found a substitute. Finding his way into the house unaccompanied, Fragonard picked up a palette of paints, and with a few deft touches transformed Mlle Guimard's Terpsichorean smile into a grimace of fury, without lessening in the least the likeness. When La Guimard arrived with an entourage and discovered it, the angrier she became, the more she represented the new portrait. In this Temple de Terpsichore, as she named it, the wildest orgies took place, according to her detractors. In 1786 she was compelled to get rid of the property, and it was disposed of by lottery for her benefit for the sum of 300,000 francs.

=== Later life ===
Soon after her retirement in 1789, she married Jean-Étienne Despréaux (1748–1820), a dancer, songwriter and playwright.

=== Legacy ===
In 2009 the bed made for Guimard to a Louis XVI design by French visionary neoclassical architect Claude Nicolas Ledoux (1736–1806) as "the high altar of the temple of love,” as Alan Rubin, the gallery owner, said, was offered for sale by Pelham Galleries at the European Fine Arts Fair in Maastricht.

Aside from her portrait at the Louvre Museum (illustration), several other Fragonard portrait drawings are conserved at the Musée des Beaux-Arts et d'archéologie de Besançon as well as a bust by Gaetano Merchi (1779) is at the Musée des Arts Décoratifs, Paris.

== See also ==
- Women in dance
