= Hôtel d'Uzès (Paris) =

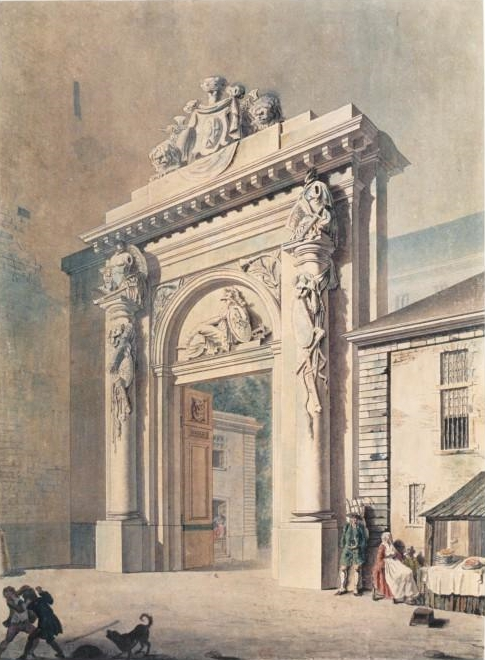
- Hôtel d'Uzès
- Interactive map of the Hôtel d'Uzès area

General information
- Type: Hôtel particulier
- Location: 172 Rue Montmartre, Paris, France
- Coordinates: 48°52′15″N 2°20′34″E
- Completed: 1700s
- Demolished: 1870

Design and construction
- Architect: Claude-Nicolas Ledoux

The Hôtel d'Uzès was a neoclassical hôtel particulier, a kind of large townhouse of France, located at 172 Rue Montmartre in the 2nd arrondissement of Paris.

== History ==
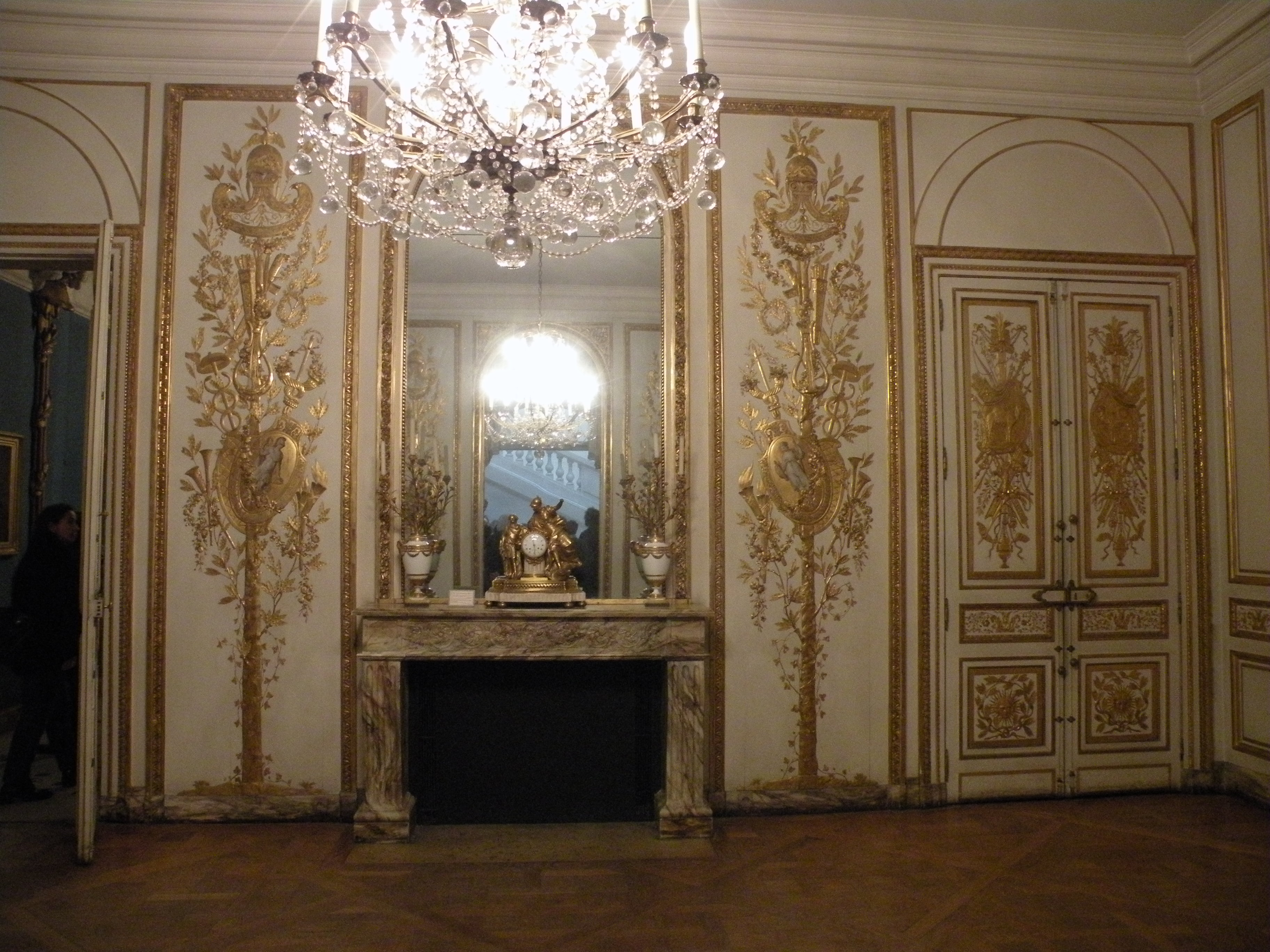
The Salon d'Uzès (1767), at the Musée Carnavalet

The Hôtel d'Uzès was originally built in the early 18th century. In 1767, neo-classical architect Claude-Nicolas Ledoux was commissioned to bring the residence up to date for its owner, François-Emmanuel de Crussol (1728–1802), 9th Duke of Uzès, who in 1753 married the daughter of the Duke of Antin. Preserving the walls of the existing hôtel, the architect plastered new façades on the old ones. On the courtyard side, the façade dressed in slits is centered on a portico resting on four Corinthian columns. On the garden side, the portico was more developed, resting on six columns of the same order. The use of the colossal order (the columns embrace two levels) was one of the characteristics of Ledoux's early works. On the garden side again, the façade was topped at the attic level by statues and trophies.

Formerly located at 72 rue Montmartre, the hôtel's entrance was monumental. It is framed by two Doric columns loaded with trophies and warrior emblems (the Duke of Uzès being a well known military man). Although the Duke was France's premier non-Royal Duke of France, the façade was considered pretentious.

=== Delessert years ===
In 1824, the hôtel was acquired by the banker Jules Paul Benjamin Delessert, founder of the Groupe Caisse d'Epargne, but also a politician and botanist. After him, his son François-Marie Delessert gathered a remarkable botanical collection there. In 1870, the building was demolished for speculative purposes. It gave way to the current rue d'Uzès, made up of industrial buildings.

While the hôtel was demolished, the paneling from the salon, an early example of the neo-classical style, largely carved by Joseph Métivier and Jean-Baptiste Boiston to the designs of Ledoux, is preserved in the Carnavalet Museum, Paris. It featured the attributes of War and the Arts hanging from trees.

== Gallery ==
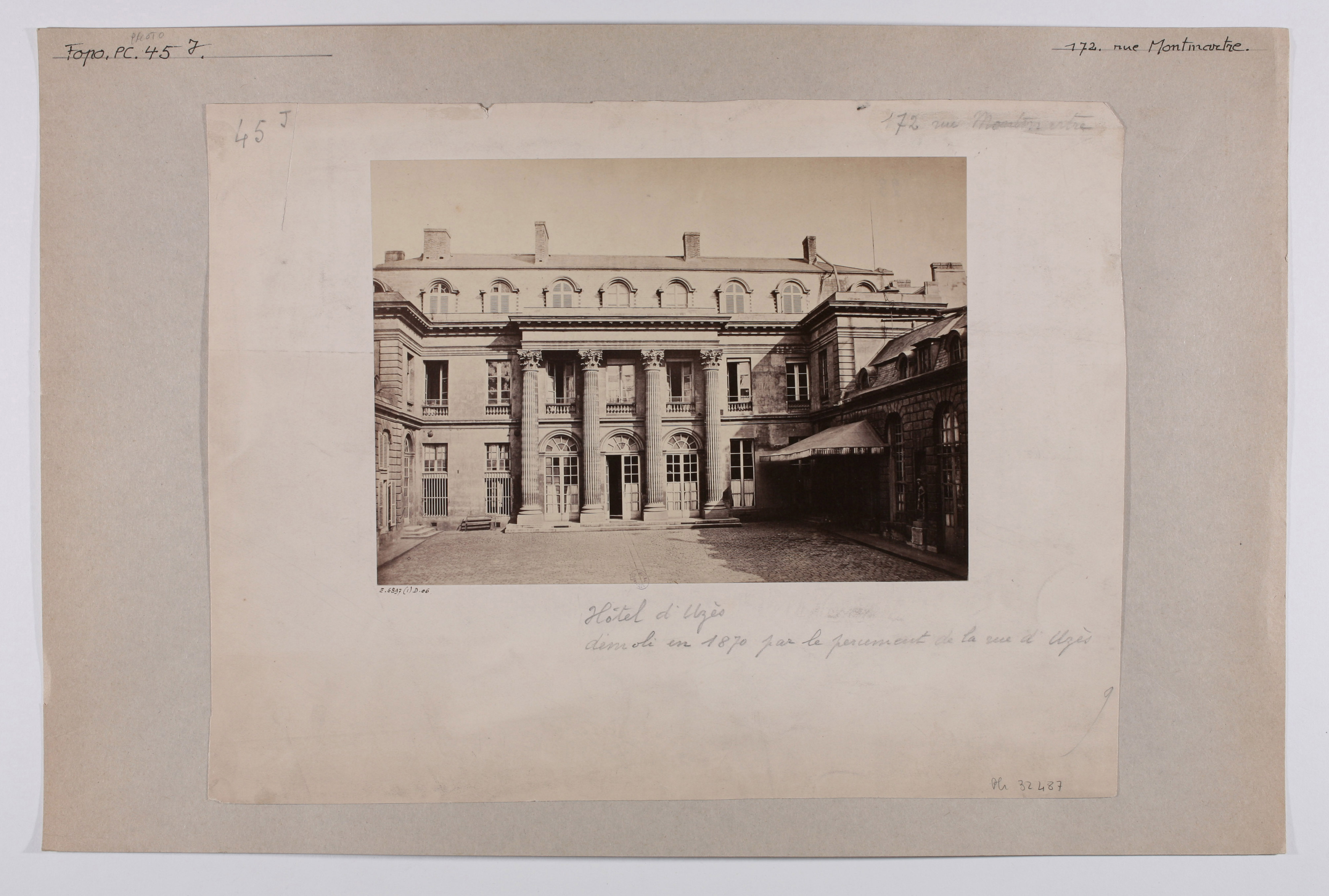
Photograph of the hôtel before demolition

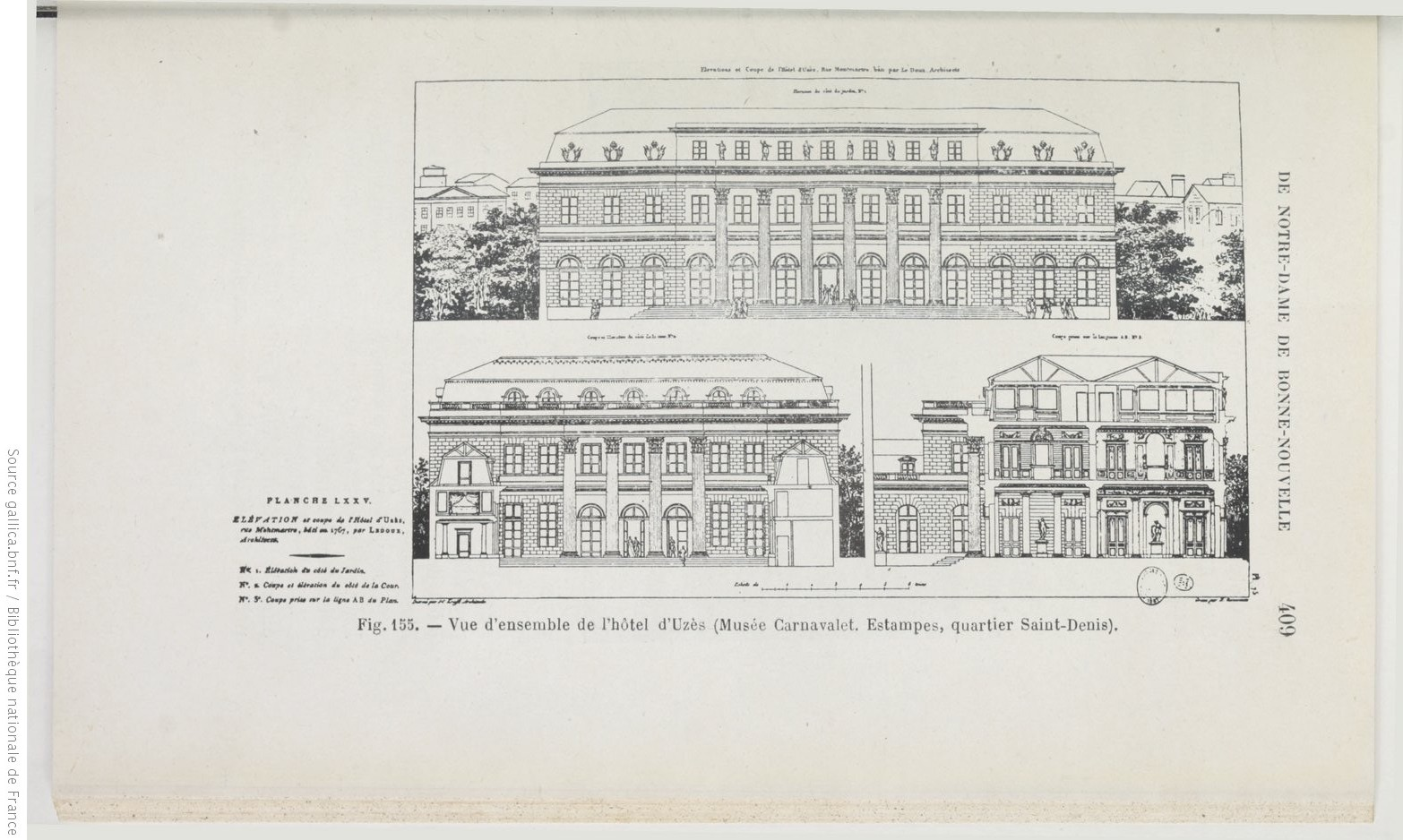
General view of the Hôtel d'Uzès

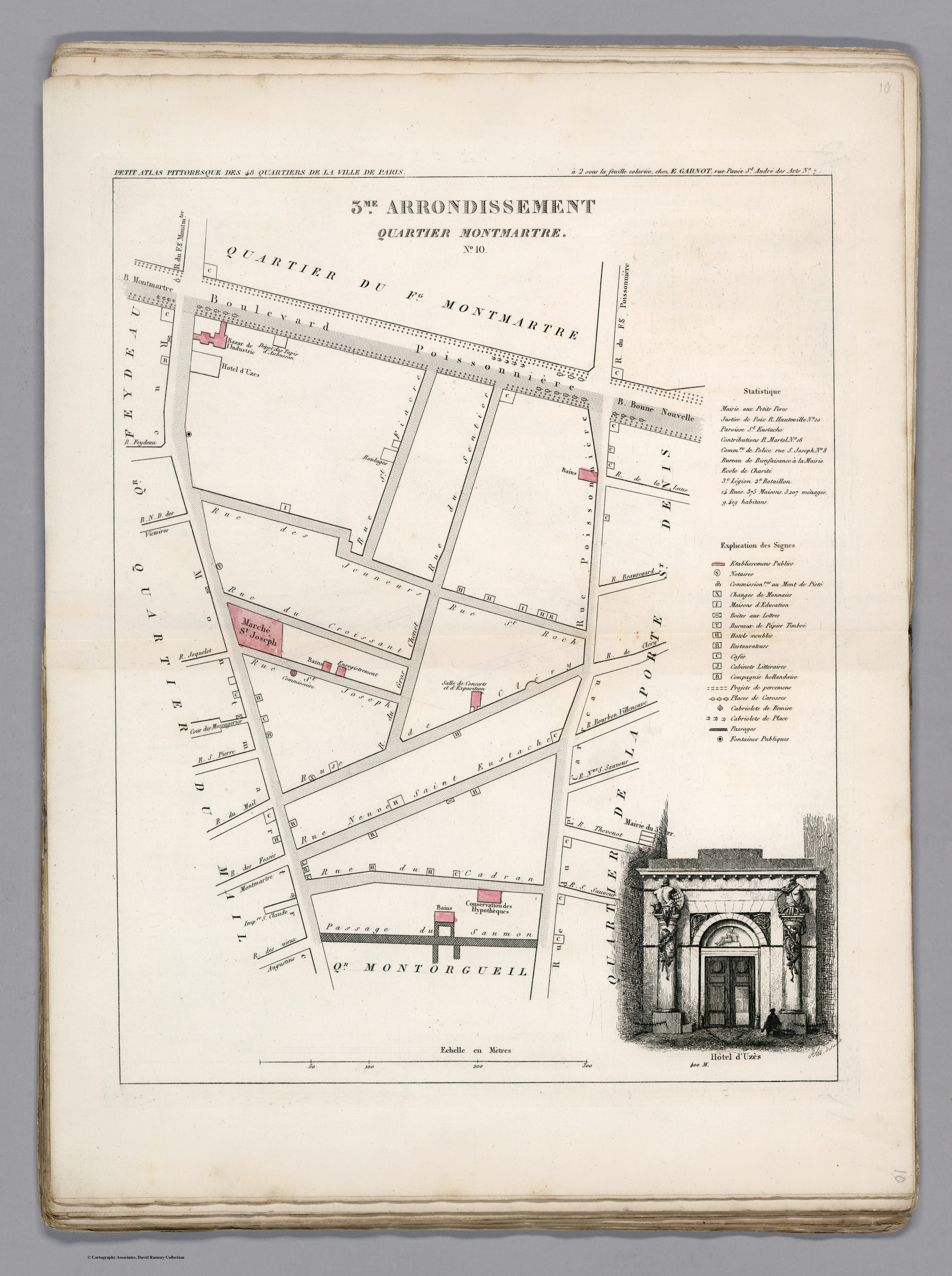
Engraved hand colored plan of 1st Borough, Faubroug du Roule

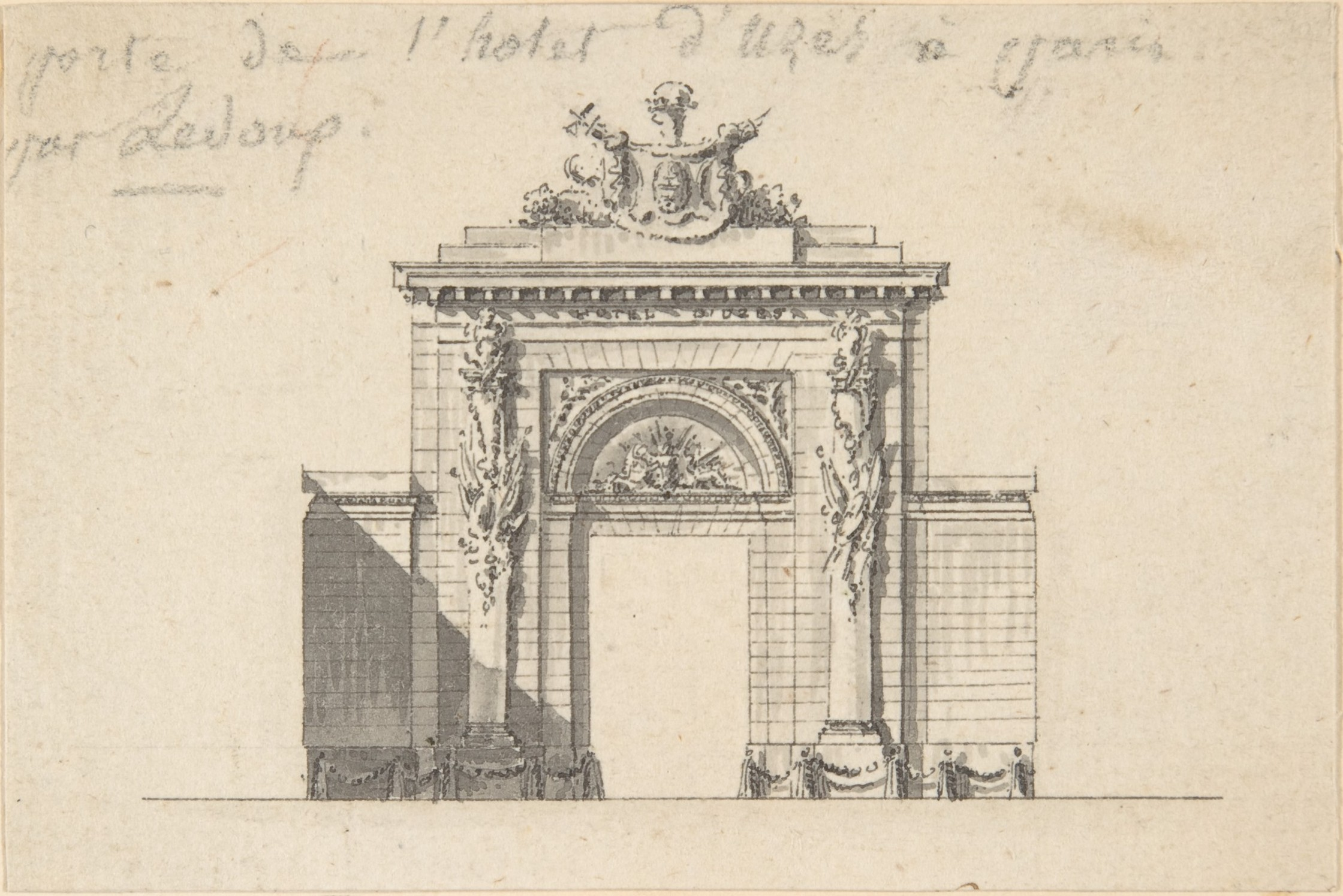
Drawing of the entrance of the Hôtel d'Uzès by Ledoux
