= Hôtel Guimard =

Coordinates: 48°52′17.97″N 2°20′0.68″E

The Hôtel Guimard (French pronunciation: [otɛl ɡimaʁ]) was a private home located at 9 rue de la Chaussée-d'Antin in Paris, France. Commissioned by the Opera dancer Marie-Madeleine Guimard, it was designed by the architect Claude-Nicolas Ledoux in the neoclassical style, then built from 1770 to 1773. It is noted for having boasted its own 500-seat theater. The building was ultimately demolished as part of the massive urban renewal program headed by Baron Haussmann, which largely reshaped the city during the Second French Empire.

== History ==
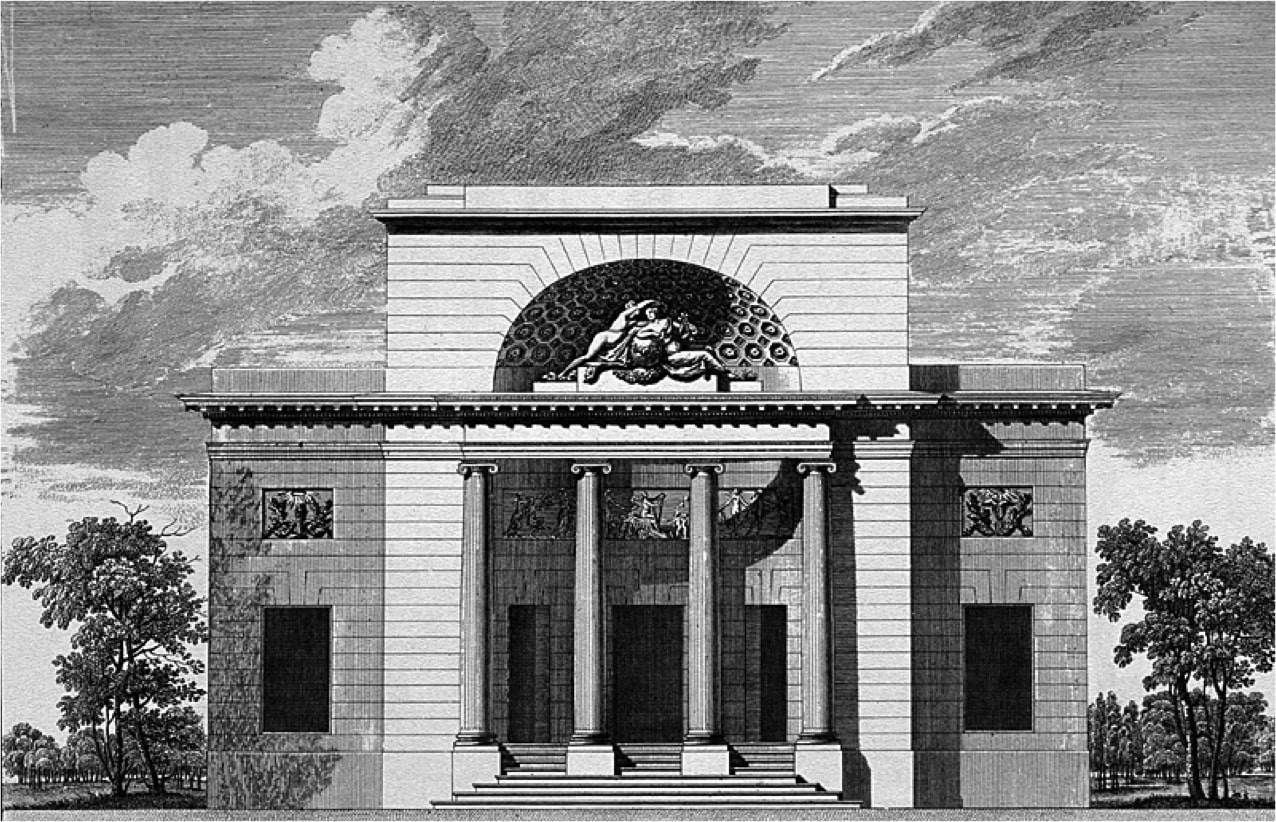
The facade of the Hôtel Guimard

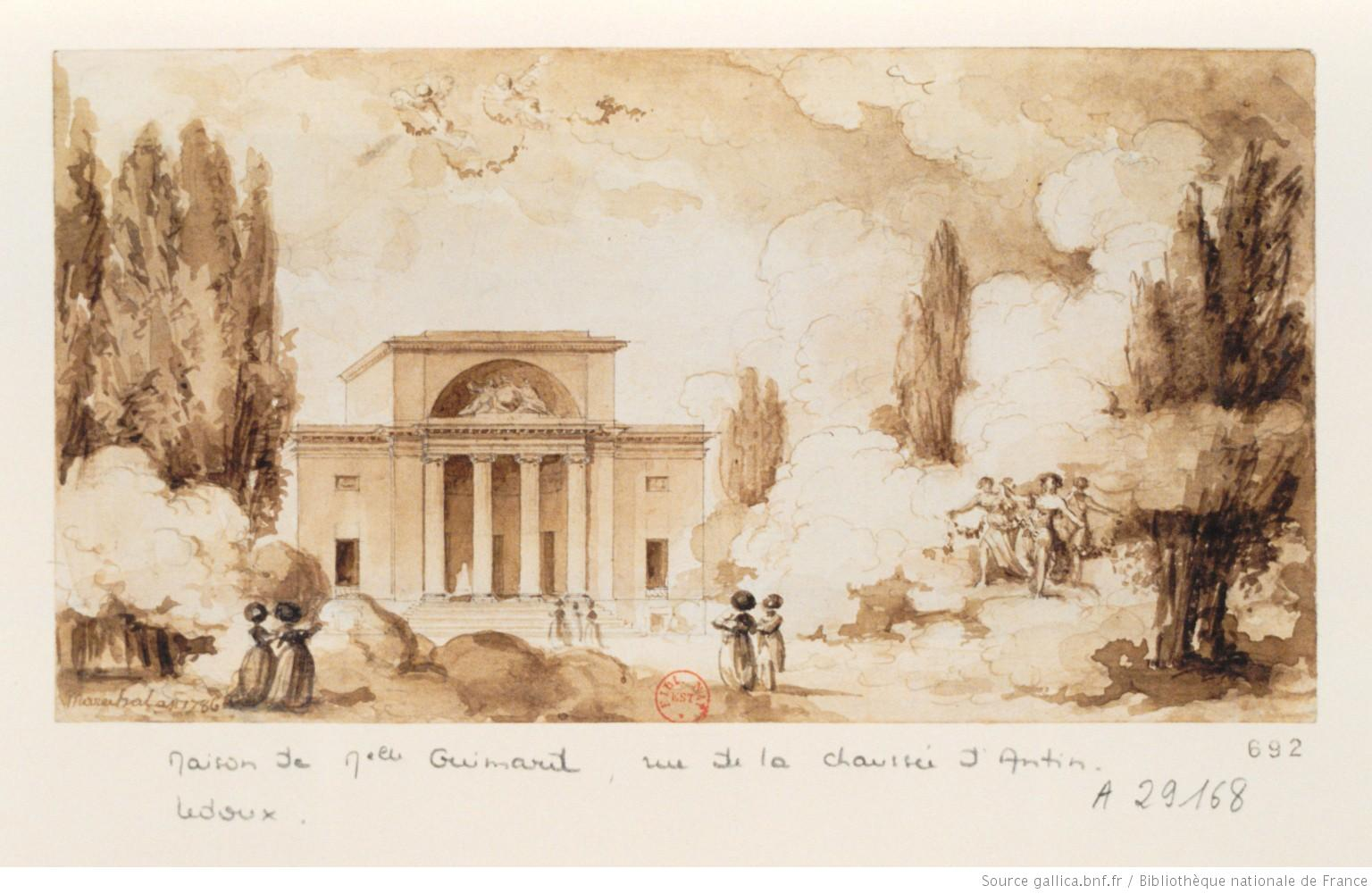
Hôtel Guimard, dessin de Jean-Baptiste Maréchal

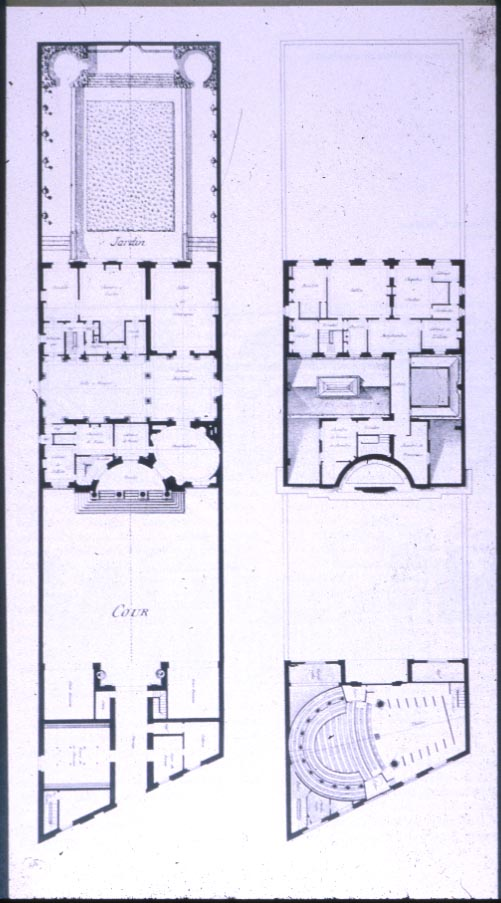
Map of the Hotel Guimard, with a theatre above the entrance

Marie-Madeleine Guimard was a ballerina for the Paris Opera. She made her fortune as mistress of the Prince de Soubise and had a hôtel particulier (or mansion) in Pantin, a Paris suburb.

The Hôtel Guimard was nicknamed the "Terpsichore temple", in reference to Molle Guimard (Terpsichore was the Muse of dance). The site featured a sculpture titled Terpsichore Crowned by Apollo, a low relief of the Muse of Dance riding a chariot "pulled by Amours surrounded by Bacchantes and Wildlife and followed by the graces of choreography".

Above the entrance was a ballet hall with a ceiling painted by Taravel, painter of the king. The theater was a 500-seat masterpiece. It opened on December 8, 1772, ending the shows of the hôtel of Pantin (which included her previous theatre). The first dinner in the hotel was banned by the Archbishop of Paris and the food was taken to a priest for distribution to the poor. Mlle Guimard welcomed as courtesan the financier Jean-Joseph de Laborde, the bishop of Taranto, and other important persons.

In a career of luxury, she offered three dinner parties a week, according to Edmond de Goncourt. One dinner was for the greatest of lords and those of the highest consideration at Court; a second dinner invited writers, artists, and wits that all but rivaled the salon of Mme Geoffrin; a third dinner was devoted to all the most ravishing and lascivious young women.

Mlle Guimard uniquely sold her hotel by holding a lottery, selling 2,500 tickets at 120 francs each. On 25 May 1785, the Countess of Lau won the hotel with only one ticket. Lau then sold the hotel for 500,000 francs to the banker Jean-Frédéric Perregaux. It was here that Jacques Laffitte began his career as a banker, under the tutelage of Perregaux.
