= Gilles Boileau =

French translator (1631–1669)

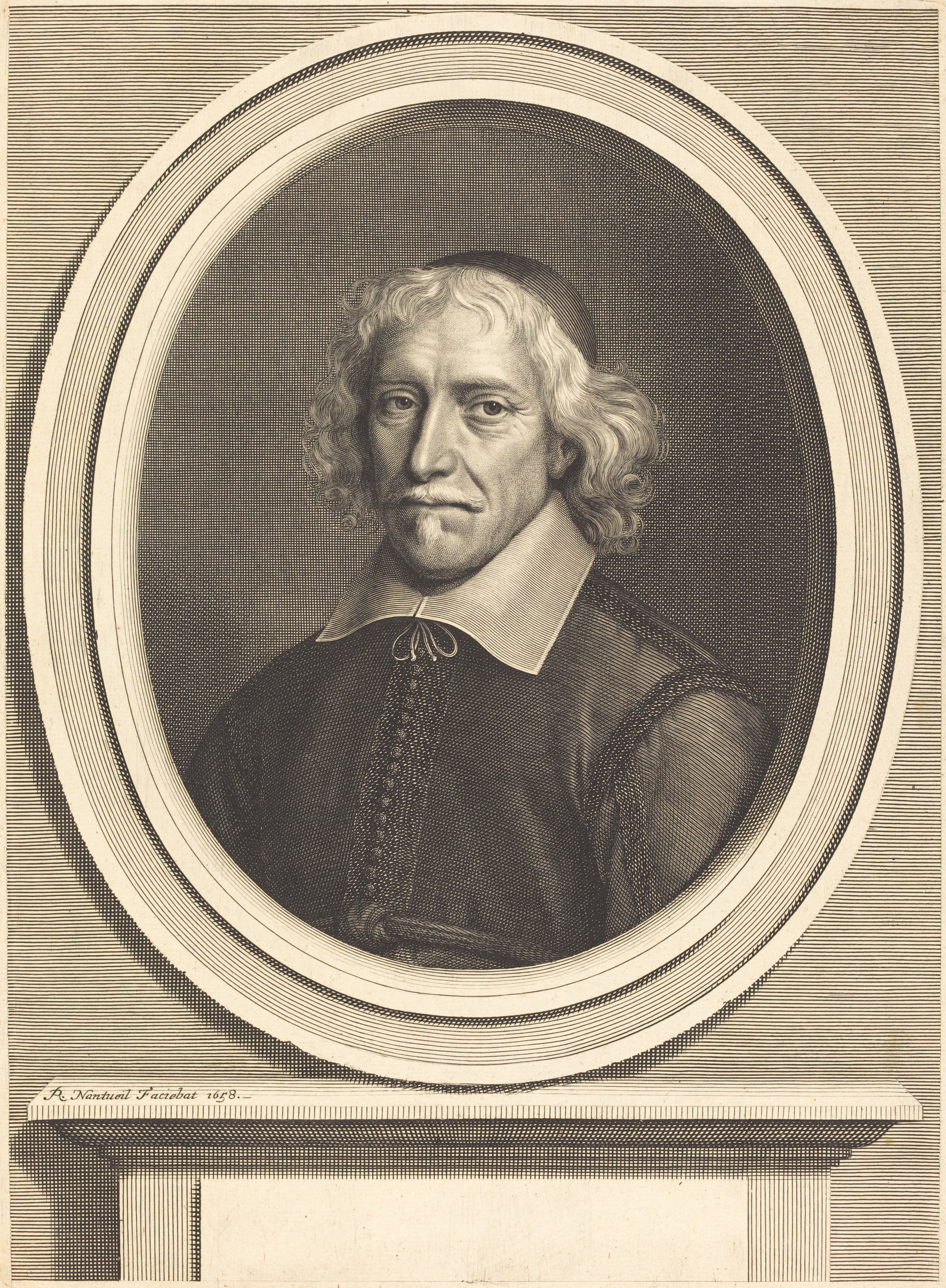
Gilles Boileau

Gilles Boileau (French pronunciation: [ʒil bwalo]; 22 October 1631, Paris – 18 March 1669), the elder brother of the more famous Nicolas Boileau-Despréaux, was a French translator and member of the Académie française.

Boileau was well regarded as a classicist by his contemporaries and published a verse translation of the fourth book of the Aeneid and prose translations of writings of Diogenes Laërtius and of Epictetus, whose life he wrote. He received a royal sinecure as contrôleur de l’argenterie du roi, and though his poetry is generally accounted mediocre, he was elected to the Académie française in January 1659.

== Académie française ==
His election to the Académie française was an event that gave rise to an incident that proved divisive in the French world of letters. The elder Boileau (who alone carried the name during his lifetime, the brother, with whom he was on ill terms in later years, being called "Despréaux") had attacked in print Mlle de Scudéry and the grammarian and lexicographer Gilles Ménage, two friends of Paul Pellisson, who mounted a campaign against the election of Gilles Boileau. In the affair Jean Chapelain, whose disastrous epic La Pucelle had been severely criticised by Pellisson, nevertheless came to defend him; doubtless, his own enmity for Boileau was affected by the satiric parody of Le Cid, Le Chapelain décoiffé (1665), jointly written by the brothers Boileau and occasioned by Chapelain's selection by Colbert to oversee the choices of authors to receive royal pensions. After the election of Gilles Boileau, pressed by Pierre Séguier, Pellisson avoided meetings of the Académie for a decade, until after Boileau's death.

== See also ==
- Jacques Boileau, another brother of Gilles Boileau
