= Château de Bénouville =

Building in Normandy, France

Coordinates: 49°14′10″N 0°16′52″W

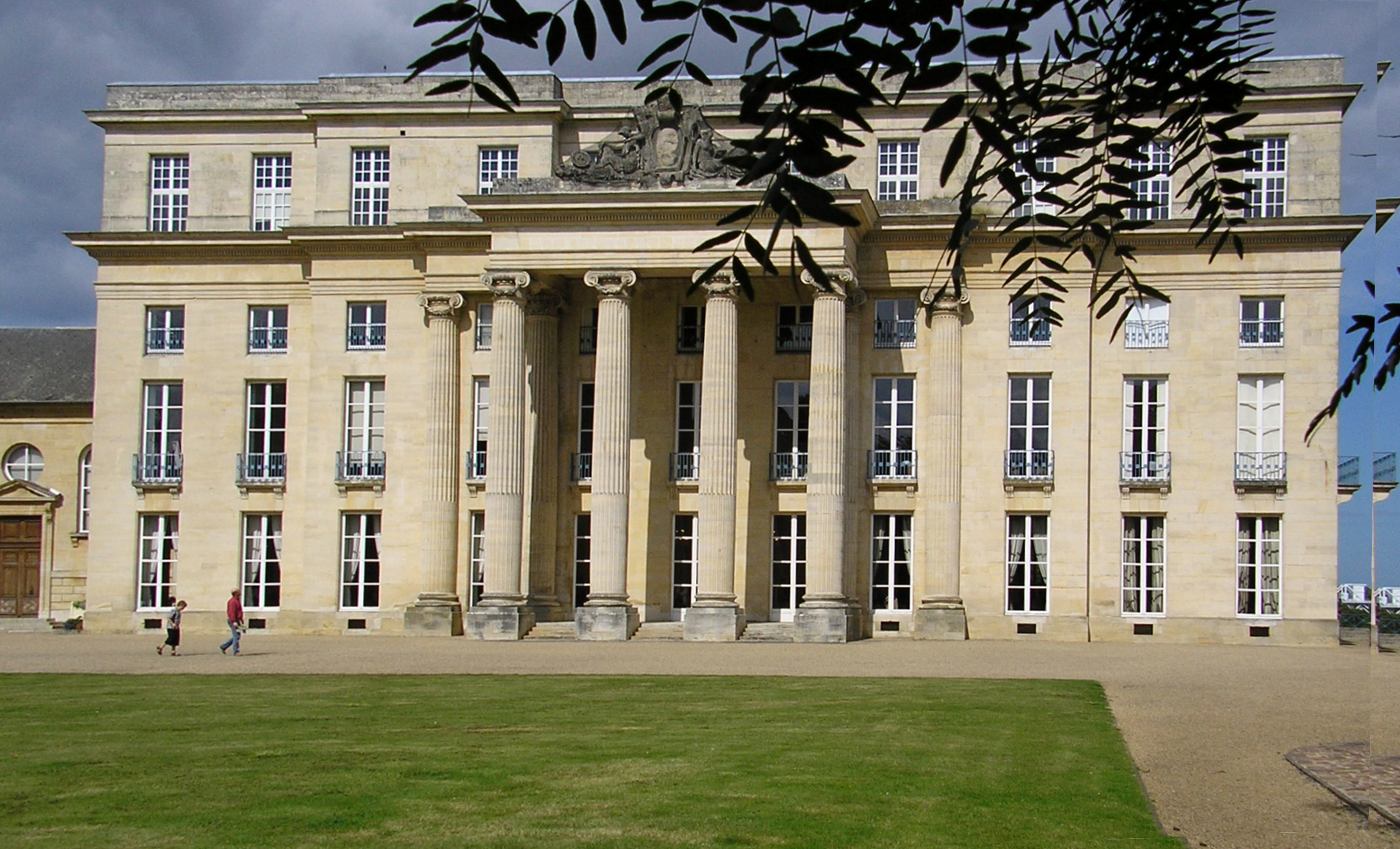
Château de Bénouville, south front.

The Château de Bénouville (French pronunciation: [ʃato də benuvil]) is a building in Bénouville, Normandy, near Caen (northern France). It was designed in 1769 by architect Claude Nicolas Ledoux and built in 1770-74 and 1776-80 at the request of Hyppolite-François Sanguin, marquis of Livry (1715–1789) and his marquise Thérèse Bonne Gillain de Bénouville, heiress of the property. The interior was under construction from 1778 to 1780 under the direction of Jean-François-Étienne Gilet, the architect of Caen. In 1792, it was purchased from the widowed marquise by a fermier général (tax collector) who was guillotined in 1794. His daughter inherited the property which remained in that family until 1927. It then became the property of the general council of Calvados which turned it into a maternity hospital (singer Gérard Lenorman was born there). In 1980, it was rehabilitated and restored, opening its doors to the public in 1990.

This château is one of the best preserved works of Ledoux, making it a major monument of neoclassical architecture at the end of the eighteenth century. Its monumental staircase and its exterior architecture were very modern for the time.

== History ==
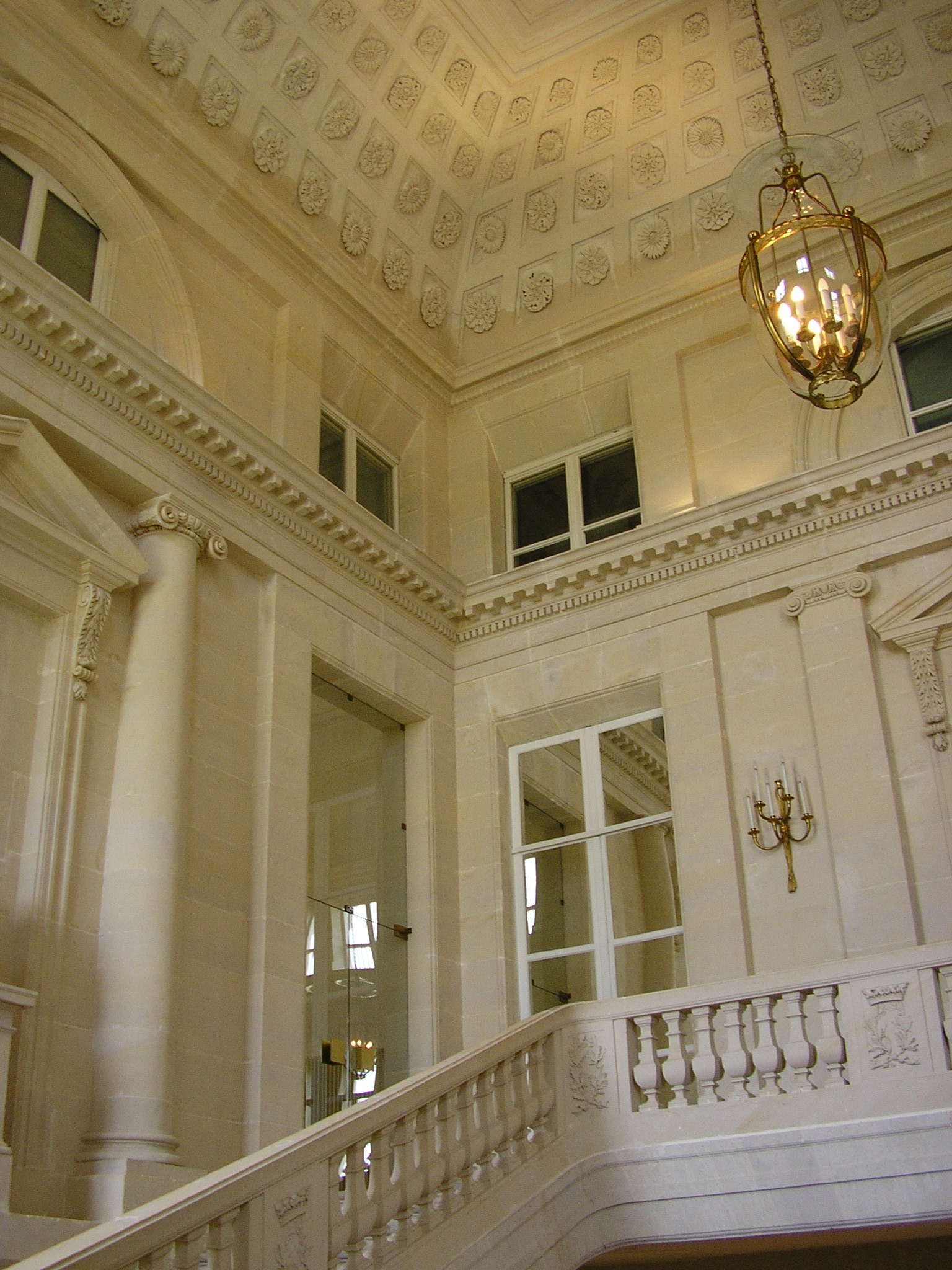
The monumental staircase hall, capped with high coffered coves

The château is located on the west side of the Canal de Caen à la Mer, on the southeast edge of the town of Bénouville, and just southwest of the Pegasus Bridge, made memorable on D-Day. During World War II the château/maternity hospital was run since 1935 by Madame Lea Vion surnamed 'la comtesse', director (from 1947-1953 she was even mayor of Benouville) who also led a resistance group of the GMO belonging to the réseau 'Centurie'. The maternity hospital became a hearth of resistance for the region. Fugitive Allied pilots and French youth unwilling to work for the Germans found a safe haven here. Weapons and a maquis-wireless transmitter were hidden here. Vion was in frequent contact with resistance activists Leonard Gille, Rene Duchez and Henri Leveille. One of her informants was Georges Gondrée, the café owner near the bridge over the Caen Canal, who secretly collected information on German defences there for the benefit of D Company 2nd Ox and Bucks under Major John Howard who would storm the bridge successfully in the night before D-Day. Via Madame Vion this important information from Gondree was sent through to England. On D-Day morning soldier Wally Parr, a sniper from the Ox and Bucks, fired some rounds from a German 5 cm anti tank-gun towards and over the château, because he erroneously thought German snipers to be present upon the roof of the building after he had seen 'something flickering'(most probably the field binoculars of an observing German Lieutenant). Major Howard made him stop this dangerous activity. Howard told Parr there were women in labour inside the chateau. At this very same moment, however, German Lieutenant Hans Hoeller, artillery officer from 8. Kompanie (Schwere Waffen), 192. Panzergrenadierregiment, Kampfgruppe Rauch, 21st Panzerdivision was standing on top of the château together with a sergeant and soldier in order to observe the canal bridge. Earlier Hans Hoeller had frustratingly found that his anti-tank troop could not pass through Benouville, because of too heavy resistance from British parachutists belonging to A Company, 7th Para Battalion under command of Nigel Taylor. He sought a suitable place to set up his batteries. Madame Vion had tried in vain to stop Lt. Hoeller from entering the "chateau". Hoeller and his colleagues were subsequently forced by Wally Parr's shelling to retreat downstairs immediately before opening their own fire on the Ox and Bucks defending the canal bridge nearby.
