= Jean-Étienne Despréaux =

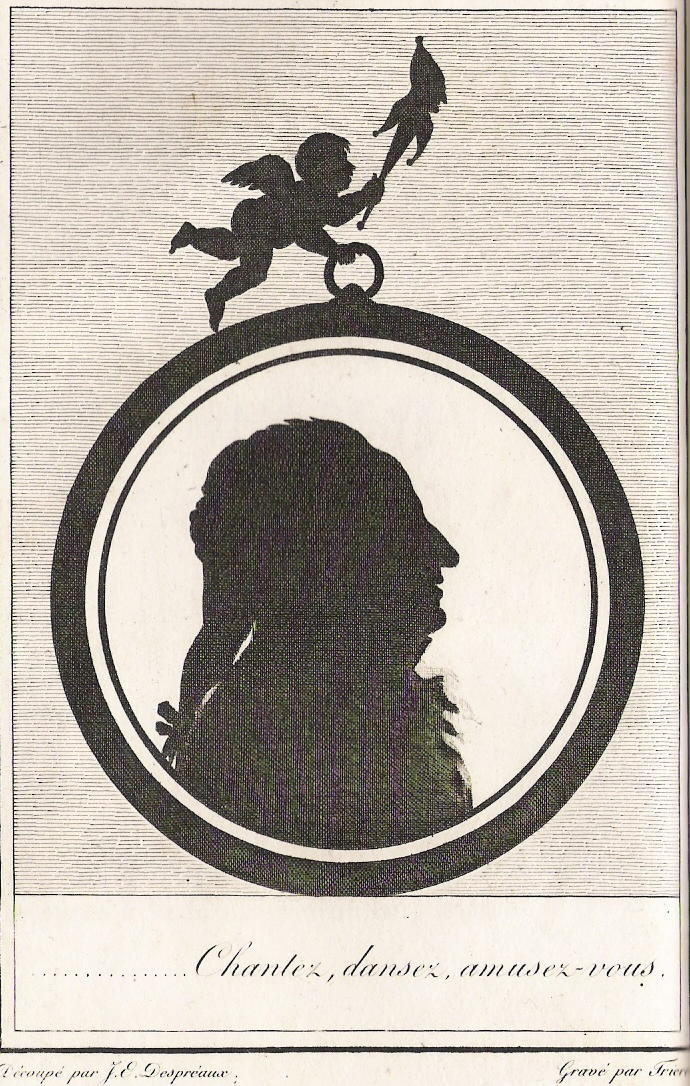
- Chantez, dansez, amusez-vous... Silhouette of Despréaux (1807)
- Born: 31 August 1748; Paris, Kingdom of France
- Died: 26 March 1820 (aged 71); Paris, Kingdom of France
- Occupations: Ballet dancer Choreographer playwright
- Spouse: Marie-Madeleine Guimard

Jean-Étienne Despréaux (French pronunciation: [ʒɑ̃ etjɛn depʁeo]; 31 August 1748 – 26 March 1820) was a French ballet dancer, choreographer, composer, singer and playwright.

== Biography ==
The son of an oboist of the orchestra of the Académie royale de musique, he made here his début in 1763, four years after his brother Claude-Jean-François.

A remarkable dancer for his lightness in the high dance, he was applauded in several ballets :

- 1771: Pyramus and Thisbe, by La Serre, Rebel and Francœur
- 1773: Les Amours de Ragonde, by Destouches and Mouret
- 1774: Iphigénie en Aulide, by Du Roullet and Gluck
- 1774: Sabinus, by Chabanon and Gossec
- 1778: La Chercheuse d'esprit, a ballet by Maximilien Gardel.

He retired in 1781 with a 1,000 livres pension and married the famous ballerina Marie-Madeleine Guimard on 14 August 1789.

Charles-Maurice Descombes, in his 1856 Histoire anecdotique du théâtre, writes:

A widower for ten years of la Guimard, Despréaux just died. To his baroque writings I preferred his imitations of dancers, because it was pleasant. From the top of a small theater where the curtain was half down, he introduced on stage the index finger of each hand sporting a tunic, a shirt and shoes which formed small legs. Then, to the sound of ballet music, he performed steps so exactly that the audience recognized the kind and manner of the dancer or ballerina he wanted to evoke.

== Works ==
Despréaux wrote several parodies of operas that Louis XV particularly appreciated.

- 1777: Berlingue, parody of Ernelinde by Sedaine and Philidor
- 1778: Momie, parody of Iphigénie en Aulide by Gluck
- 1778: Romans, parody of Roland by Quinault and Lully
- 1780: Christophe et Pierre-Luc, parody of Castor et Pollux by Gentil Bernard and Rameau
- 1786: Syncope, reine de Mic-Mac, parody of Pénélope by Cimarosa
- 1801: Jenesaiki, ou les Exaltés de Charenton, parody of Béniovski ou les Exilés du Kamchattka by Boieldieu
- 1801: La Tragédie au vaudeville, en attendant le vaudeville à la tragédie, parody of Othello by Jean-François Ducis

He also made the opening prologue for the Théâtre de la Reine in May 1780.

But he is mostly known as the author of Mes passe-temps : chansons, suivies de l'Art de la danse, poème en quatre chants, calqué sur l'Art poétique de Boileau Despréaux, seminal work for choreography considered as an art in itself, and not as mere entertainment.

== Bibliography ==
- Jacques-Alphonse Mahul, Annuaire nécrologique, ou Supplément annuel et continuation de toutes les biographies ou dictionnaires historiques, 1e année, 1820, Paris : Baudoin, 1821, (p. 82–83)
- Émile Campardon, L’Académie royale de musique au XVIIIe, Paris, Berger-Levrault et C^{ie}, 1884, vol. I, (p. 245–247).
