= Claude Nicolas Ledoux =

French Neoclassical architect

Claude-Nicolas Ledoux
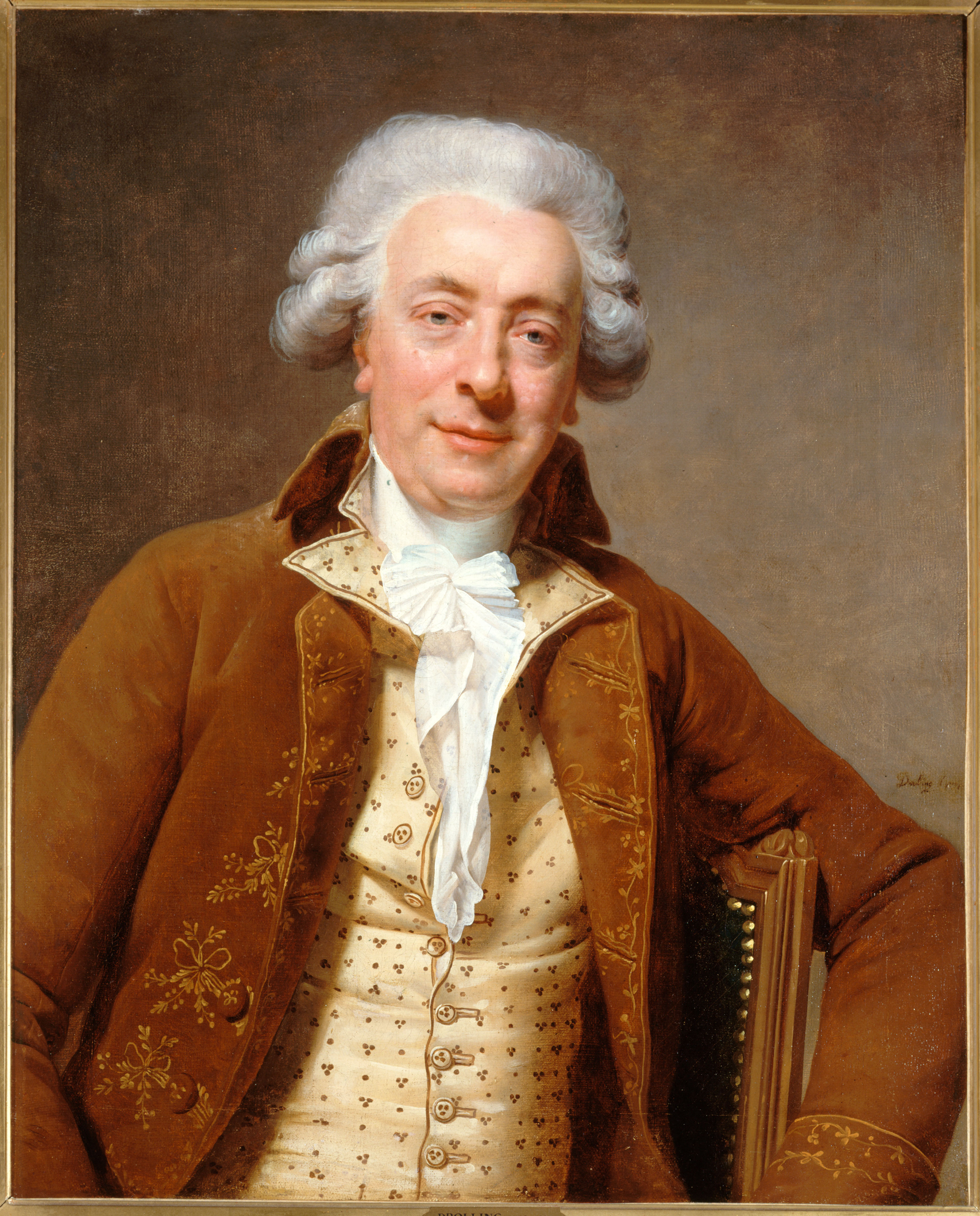
- Ledoux by Martin Drolling, 1790
- Born: 21 March 1736; Dormans-sur-Marne, France
- Died: November 18, 1806 (aged 70); Paris, France
- Occupation: Architect

Signature
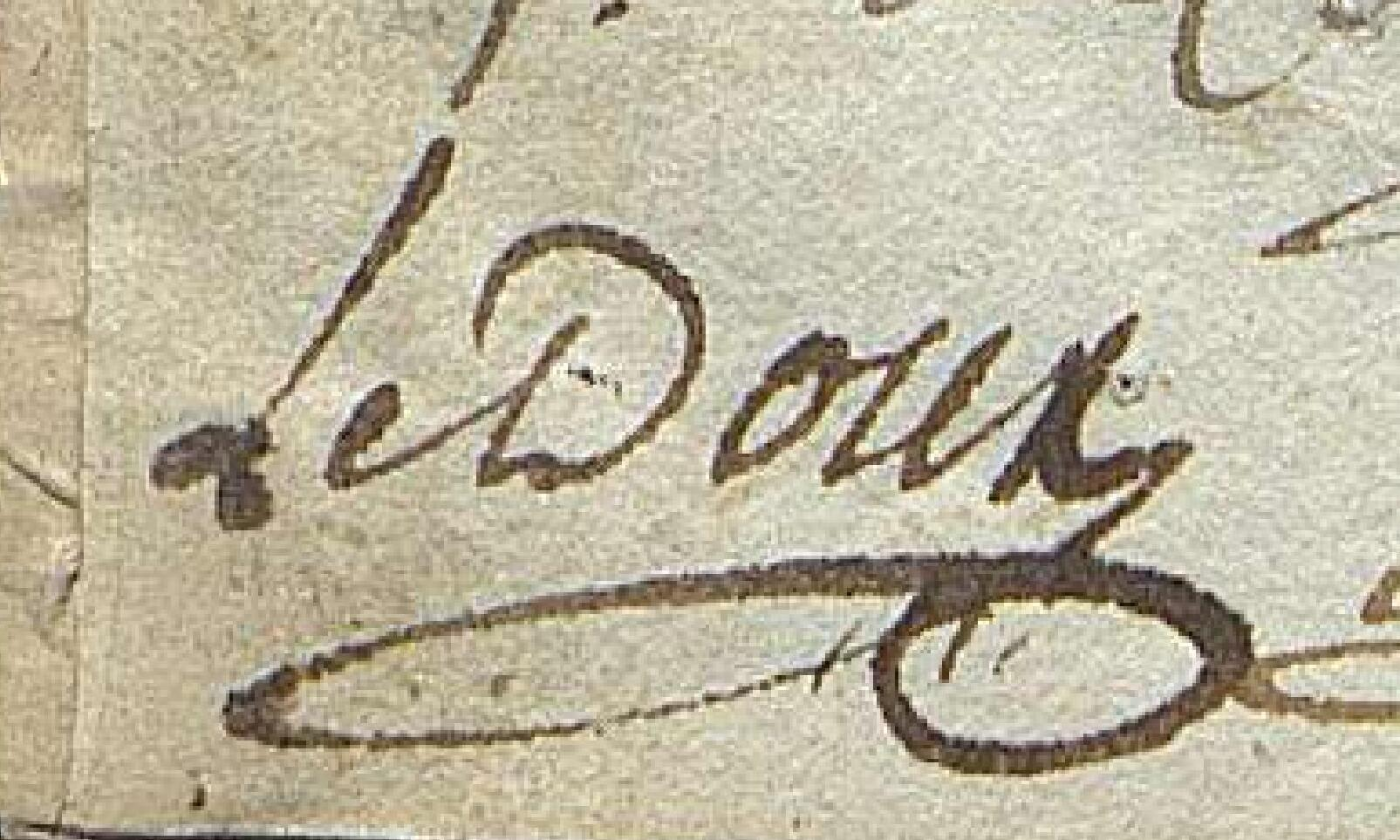

Claude-Nicolas Ledoux (French pronunciation: [klod nikɔla lədu]; 21 March 1736 – 18 November 1806) was one of the earliest exponents of French Neoclassical architecture. He used his knowledge of architectural theory to design not only domestic architecture but also town planning; as a consequence of his visionary plan for the Ideal City of Chaux, he became known as a utopian. His greatest works were funded by the French monarchy and came to be perceived as symbols of the ancien régime rather than Utopia. The French Revolution hampered his career; much of his work was destroyed in the nineteenth century. In 1804, he published a collection of his designs under the title L'Architecture considérée sous le rapport de l'art, des mœurs et de la législation (Architecture considered in relation to art, morals, and legislation). In this book he took the opportunity of revising his earlier designs, making them more rigorously neoclassical and up to date. This revision has distorted an accurate assessment of his role in the evolution of Neoclassical architecture. His most ambitious work was the uncompleted Royal Saltworks at Arc-et-Senans, an idealistic and visionary town showing many examples of architecture parlante. Conversely his works and commissions also included the more mundane and everyday architecture such as approximately sixty elaborate tollgates around Paris in the Wall of the General Tax Farm.

== Biography ==
Ledoux was born in 1736 in Dormans-sur-Marne, the son of a modest merchant from Champagne. At an early age his mother, Francoise Domino, and godmother, Francoise Piloy, encouraged him to develop his drawing skills. Later the Abbey of Sassenage funded his studies in Paris (1749–1753) at the Collège de Beauvais, where he followed a course in Classics. On leaving the Collège, age 17, he took employment as an engraver but four years later he began to study architecture under the tutelage of Jacques-François Blondel, for whom he maintained a lifelong respect.

He then trained under Pierre Contant d'Ivry, and also made the acquaintance of Jean-Michel Chevotet. These two eminent Parisian architects designed in both the restrained French Rococo manner, known as the "Louis XV style" and in the "Goût grec" (literally "Greek taste") phase of early Neoclassicism. However, under the tutelage of Contant d'Ivry and Chevotet, Ledoux was also introduced to Classical architecture, in particular the temples of Paestum, which, along with the works of Palladio, were to influence him greatly.

The two master architects introduced Ledoux to their affluent clientele. One of Ledoux's first patrons was the Baron Crozat de Thiers, an immensely wealthy connoisseur who commissioned him to remodel part of his palatial town house in the Place Vendôme. Another client obtained through the auspices of his teachers was Président Hocquart de Montfermeil and his sister, Mme de Montesquiou.

=== Early work (1762–1770) ===
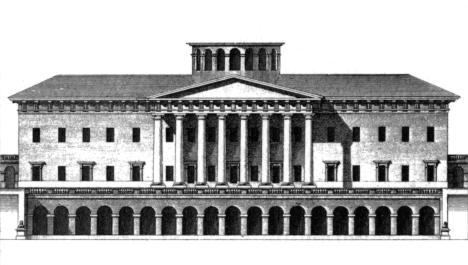
Château de Mauperthuis, 1763 (demolished)

In 1762, the young Ledoux was commissioned to redecorate the Café Godeau, in the rue Saint-Honoré. The result was an interior of trompe-l'œil and mirrors. Pilasters painted on the walls were interspersed with alternating Pier glasses and panels painted with trophies of helmets and weaponry, all executed in bold detail. In 1969 this interior was moved to the Musée Carnavalet.

The following year the Marquis de Montesquiou-Fézensac commissioned Ledoux to redesign the old hilltop château on his estate at Mauperthuis. Ledoux rebuilt the château and created new gardens, replete with fountains supplied by an aqueduct. In addition in the gardens and park he built an orangery, a pheasantry and vast dépendances of which little remains today.

In 1764, he designed for Président Hocquart, a Palladian house on the Chaussée d'Antin using the colossal order. Ledoux would frequently employ this motif that was condemned by the strict French tradition, which embraced the principle of superimposing the classic column motifs on each floor, rising from simplest to the most complex: Tuscan, Doric, Ionic, Corinthian, etc.

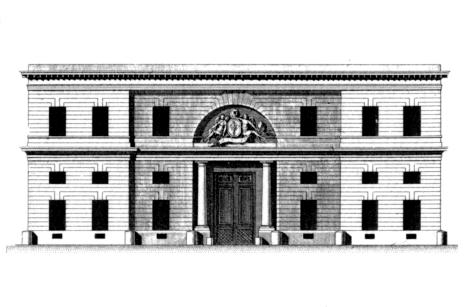
Hôtel d'Hallwyll, Paris, 1766. Elevation of the facade on the rue Michel-le-Comte.

On 26 July 1764, in the Saint-Eustache Church, Paris, Ledoux married Marie Bureau, the daughter of a court musician. A friend from Champagne, Joseph Marin Masson de Courcelles, found him a position as the architect for the Water and Forestry Department. Here between 1764 and 1770 he worked on the renovation and designs of churches, bridges, wells, fountains and schools.

Among the still extant works from this period are the bridge of Marac, the Prégibert bridge in Rolampont, the churches of Fouvent-le-Haut, Roche-et-Raucourt, Rolampont, the nave and portal of Cruzy-le-Châtel, and the quire of Saint-Etienne d'Auxerre.

In 1766 Ledoux began designing the Hôtel d'Hallwyll (Le Marais, Paris), a building that, according to the Dijon architect Jacques Cellerier, received widespread praise and attracted new patrons to the architect. The owner Franz-Joseph d'Hallwyll (a Swiss colonel) and his wife, Marie-Thérèse Demidorge, were anxious to ensure work was executed economically. Therefore, Ledoux had to reuse portions of the existing buildings, the former Hôtel de Bouligneux. He had envisaged two colonnades in the Doric order leading to a nymphaeum decorated with urns at the foot of the garden. However, the limitations of the site made this impossible, so Ledoux resorted to trompe-l'œil painting a colonnade on the blind wall of the neighboring convent, thus extending the perspective.

The recognition given to the relatively modest Hôtel d'Hallwyll led in 1767 to a more prestigious commission, the Hôtel d'Uzès, on the rue Montmartre. There too, Ledoux preserved the structure of an earlier building. Today the panelling from the salon, an early example of the neoclassical style, largely carved by Joseph Métivier and Jean-Baptist Boiston to the designs of Ledoux, is preserved in the Carnavalet Museum, Paris.

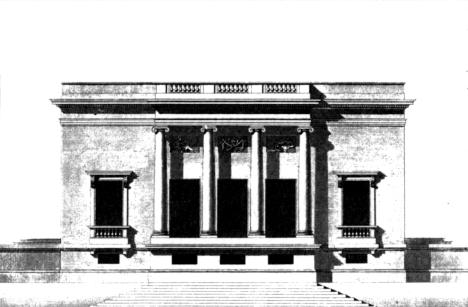
Pavilion of Mme du Barry, Louveciennes, 1770-1771

Ledoux designed the Château de Bénouville in Calvados (1768–1769) for the Marquis de Livry. With its simple, almost severe, facade of four stories, broken by a prostyle portico, the Château de Bénouville, while not one of Ledoux's most inventive plans, is notable for the unusual placement of the main staircase at the center of the garden facade, a position normally taken by the main salon.

Ledoux travelled to England in the years 1769-1771. There he became familiar with the Palladian style of architecture. Palladio, an influential Renaissance architect, was famous for his Italian villas (e.g., the Villa Rotunda). From this point Ledoux worked often in the Palladian style, usually employing a cubic design broken by a prostyle portico which gave an air of importance even to a small structure. In this genre, he built, in 1770, a house for Marie Madeleine Guimard in the Chaussée d'Antin; and following that commission the house of Mlle Saint-Germain, in the Rue Saint-Lazare, the house of Attilly in the suburb of Poissonnière, a house for the poet Jean François de Saint-Lambert in Eaubonne, and most notably the Music Pavilion constructed between 1770 and 1771 at the Château de Louveciennes for the King's mistress Madame du Barry, whose patronage and influence were to be of use to Ledoux in later years.

== Later works ==
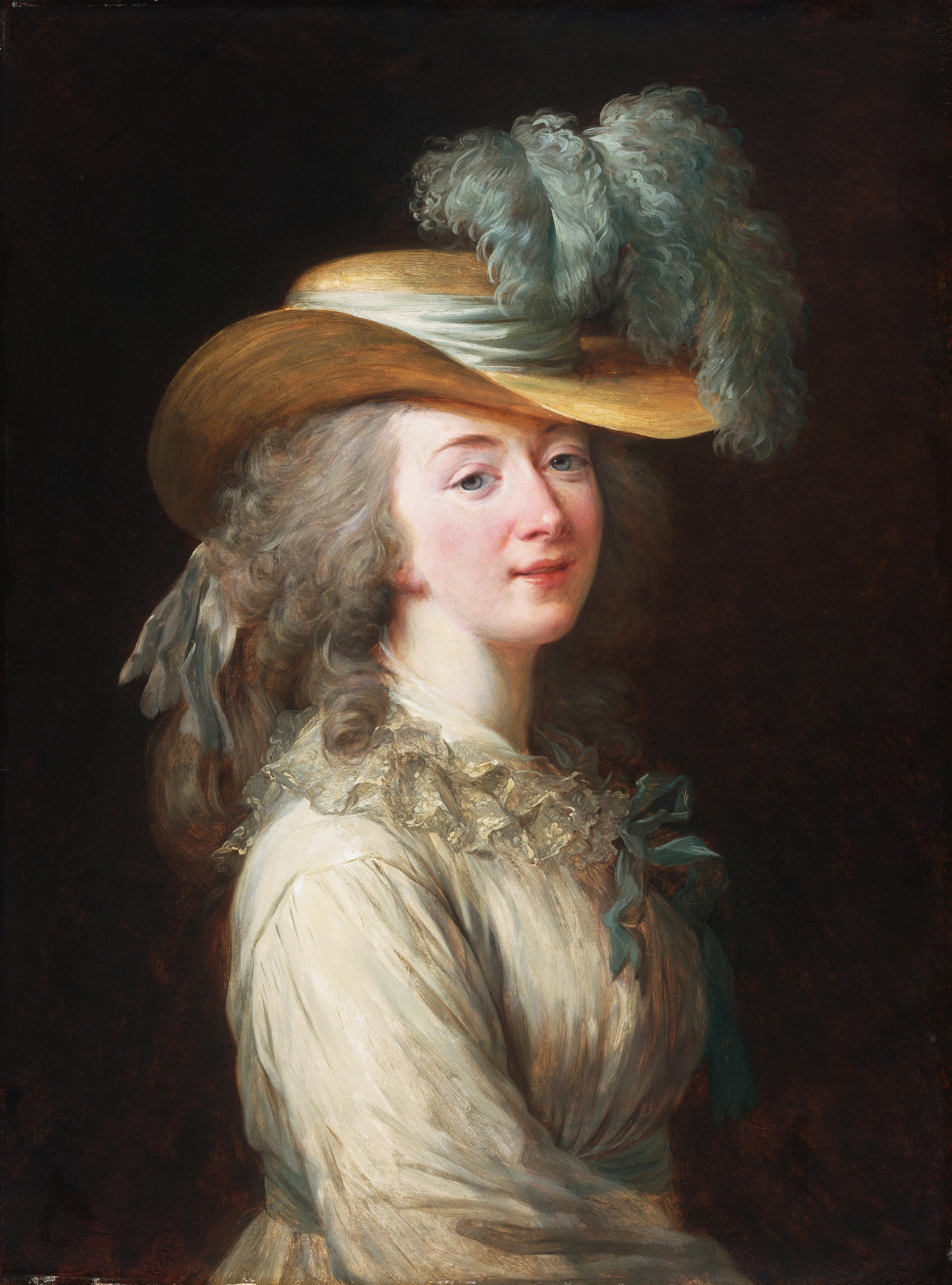
Madame du Barry, for whom Ledoux designed a Music Pavilion at her Château de Louveciennes, was to use her influence to advance his career

His reputation established, Ledoux commenced a period of yet more ambitious designs. The Hôtel de Montmorency on the Chaussée d'Antin dates from this period. It has a principal façade in the Ionic order above a rustic ground floor. Statues of illustrious members of the Montmorency family decorate the roof. However, the depletion of the Montmorency fortune meant that Ledoux was required to execute the project with some parsimony.

In the year 1775 Ledoux arrived in Kassel, Germany to become "Contrôlleur et ordonnateur des bâtimens de Hesse". Back in Paris, he received the plans for Museum Fridericianum and for the new entrance of the town, to correct them. This work was finished in April 29th 1776. Of these corrections survived the plan for the first floor of the Museum with the drawings and comments of Ledoux.

Ledoux was interested in the work of the Royal Administrations Department and at times considered working for them, even though the positions they offered were often on the borderline between architect and engineer. Through this interest in civic and municipal architecture and due, in no small part, to the notorious influence of Madame du Barry, Ledoux was commissioned with the modernization of the Salines de l'Est (Eastern Saltworks). The modernization was initiated following the construction of the Burgundy Canal. In 1771 Ledoux was promoted to Inspector of the saltworks in Franche-Comté, a title he held until 1790, with the position yielding him an annual salary of 6000 livres.

=== The Royal Saltworks at Arc-et-Senans (1775–1778) ===
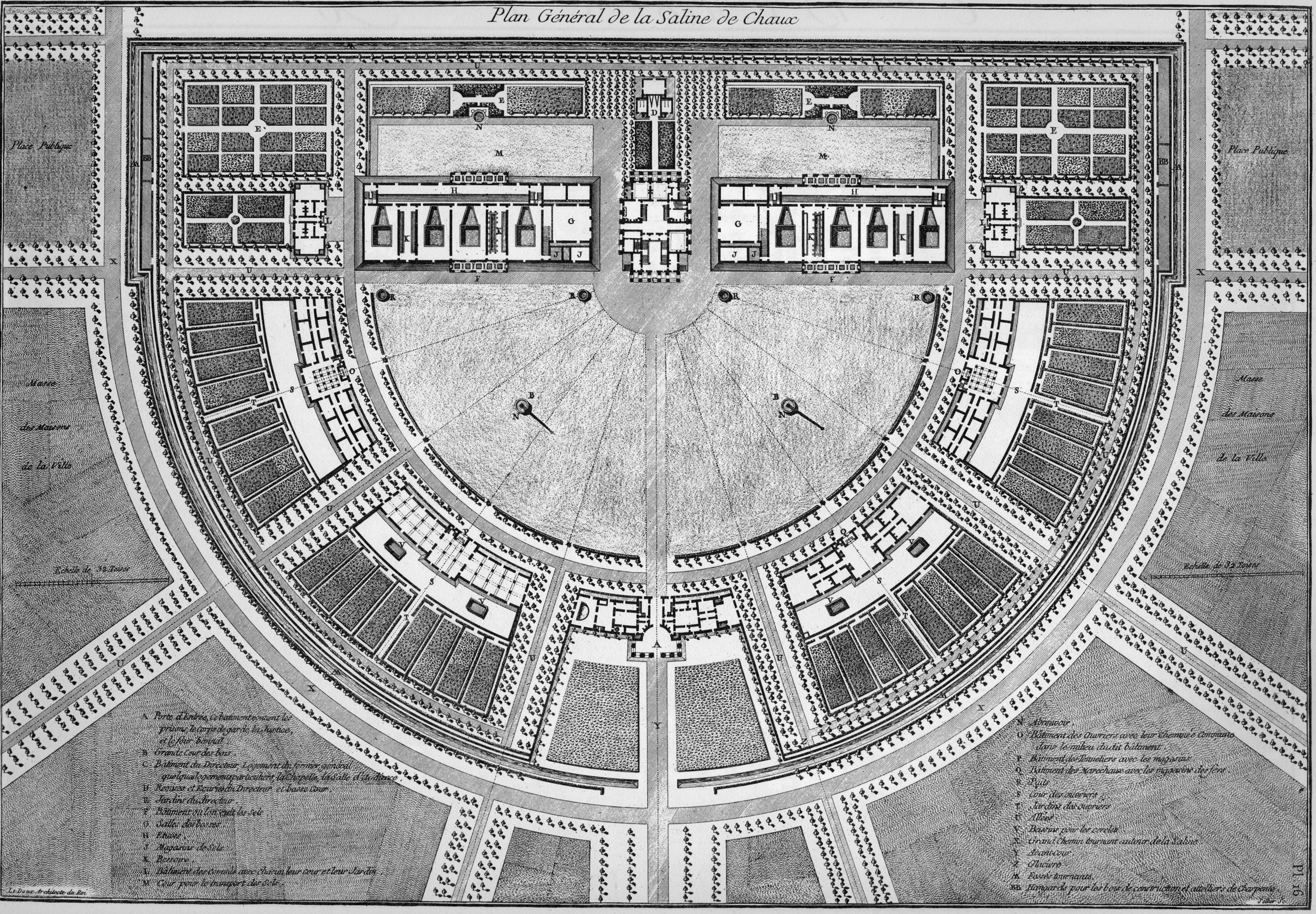
Plan view of the facilities

In the 18th century salt was an essential and valuable commodity. The unpopular salt tax, known as the gabelle, was collected by the Ferme Générale. Salt served as a valuable source of income for the French king. In Franche-Comté, due to subterranean seams of halite, salt was extracted from saline wells by vaporizing in wood-fuelled furnaces.

In Salins-les-Bains or in Montmorot, the saltworks' boilers were built close to the wells, and the wood was brought from the adjacent forests. Contrary to what the French government wanted, Ledoux placed the saltworks near the woods as opposed to the source of the salt water. He logically reasoned that it would be easier to transport water than wood. Close to the first of these sites, the Fermiers Généraux decided to explore a more mechanized and efficient method of extraction, by constructing a purpose-built factory near the forest of Chaux, in the Val d'Amour. The saline water was to be brought to the factory by a newly constructed canal.

The design, which received royal approval, of the Royal Saltworks at Arc-et-Senans, or Salines de Chaux, is considered Ledoux's masterpiece. The initial building work was conceived as the first phase of a large and grandiose scheme for a new ideal city. The first (and, as things were to turn out, only) stage of building was constructed between 1775 and 1778. Entrance is through a massive Doric portico, inspired by the temples at Paestum. The alliance of the columns is an archetypal motif of neoclassicism. Inside, a cavernous hall gives the impression of entering an actual salt mine, decorated with concrete ornamentation representing the elementary forces of nature and the organizing genius of man, a reflection of the views of the relationship between civilization and nature endorsed by such eighteenth-century philosophers as Jean-Jacques Rousseau.

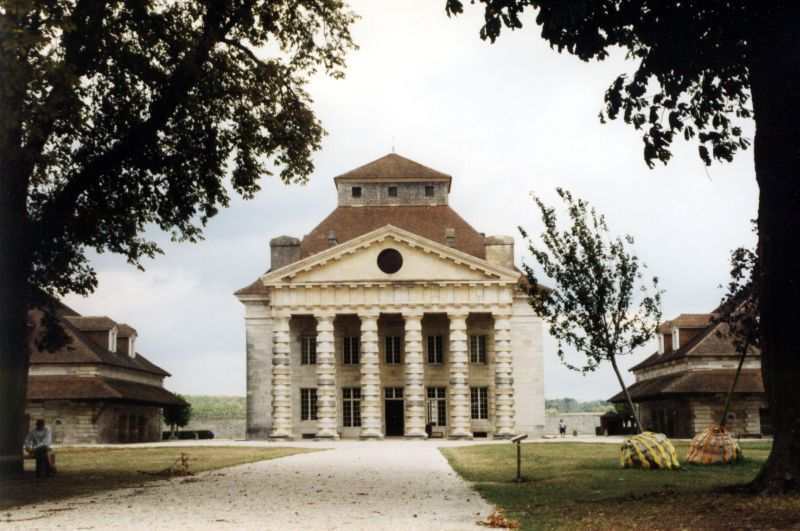
The Royal Saltworks at Arc-et-Senans: House of the director

The entrance building opens into a vast semicircular open air space that is surrounded by ten buildings, which are arranged on the arc of a semicircle. On the arc is the cooper's forge, the forging mill and two bothies for the workers. On the straight diameter are the workshops for the extraction of salt alternating with administrative buildings. At the centre is the house of the director (illustrated), which originally also contained a chapel.

The significance of this plan is twofold: the circle, a perfect figure, evokes the harmony of the ideal city and theoretically encloses a place of harmony for common work, but it recalls also contemporary theories of organization and of official surveillance, particularly the Panopticon of Jeremy Bentham.

The saltworks entered a painful phase of industrial production and marginal profit, because of competition with the salt-water marshes. After some not very profitable trials, it closed indefinitely in 1790 during the national instability caused by the French Revolution. Thus the dream of success for a factory, conceived at the same time as a royal residence and a new city, ended.

For a brief period in the 1920s the salt works were reused but eventually closed due to competition. For the following decades, the salt works lay in decay until they were named a UNESCO world heritage site and refurbished as a local cultural center.

=== The theatre of Besançon ===
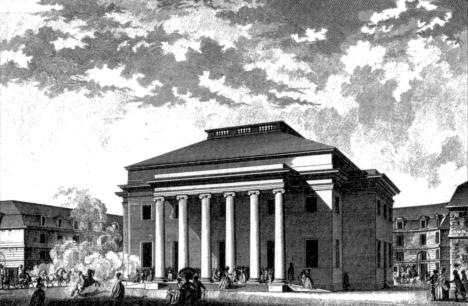
Théâtre de Besançon, 1784

In 1784 Ledoux was the architect selected to design a theatre at Besançon, Franche-Comté. The exterior of the building was designed as a severe Palladian cube, adorned only by an almost Grecian neoclassical portico of six Ionic columns. However, if the neoclassical hints to the exterior was regarded as modern then the interior was a revolution – venues for public entertainment were rare in the French provinces, and where they did exist it was traditional that only the nobles had seating, while those of less exulted rank had stood. Ledoux, realizing this was not only inconvenient but elitist planned the theatre at Besançon on more egalitarian lines with seating for all but in some quarters such a plan was seen as radical if not revolutionary, the aristocracy had no wish to be seated alongside commoners. However Ledoux found an ally in the Intendant of Franche-Comté, Charles André de la Coré, an enlightened man, he consented to follow this reforming plan. Even so, it was decided that the social classes would still be segregated thus while the theatre of was the first to have a ground floor amphitheatre furnished with seats for the ordinary paying public. Above them was a raised terrace or balcony for state employers. Directly above was the first tier of boxes reserved for the aristocracy, and above this a tier of smaller boxes occupied by the middle-class the second. Thus, Ledoux achieved his ambition that the theatre could be a place of social communion and shared entertainment while still maintaining a strict hierarchy of the classes.

The seating was not the only innovation at the theatre. With the aid of the machinist Dart de Bosco, Ledoux expanded the wings and back stage scenery apparatus, giving it greater depth than was customary, and many other modern improvements. Besançon was the first theatre to screen the musicians in an orchestra pit. The building was widely acclaimed on its opening in 1784, but when Ledoux submitted plans for the proposed new theatre in Marseille, they were not accepted.

In 1784, Ledoux was chosen over Pierre-Adrien Pâris for the construction of the new town hall in Neufchâtel. This was followed by the spectacular project that he conceived for the Palais de Justice and the prison of Aix-en-Provence. This project, however, was beset by many difficulties. Trouble began in 1789 when construction was interrupted by the French Revolution, when only the ground floor walls had been completed

=== Domestic and commercial architecture ===
Ledoux was a Freemason Ledoux took part, with his friend William Beckford, in various masonic ceremonies at the Loge Féminine de la Candeur which met in the town house he had built for Mme d'Espinchal, on the Rue des Petites-Écuries.

He was well acquainted with the world of finance and those who inhabited it. He designed a large house and park for Praudeau de Chemilly, the treasurer of the Maréchaussées, at Bourneville near Ferté-Milon. One of his more notable townhouses was for the widow of the Genevan banker, Thélusson. This classical mansion, a venue for Parisian high society, was situated at the heart of a large landscaped garden accessed from the Rue de Provence. The house had an immense porte-cochere in the form of a pillared triumphal arch. The circular central salon, had at its centre a colonnade which supported the ceiling.

On the Rue Saint-Georges, for the creole Hosten, Ledoux designed an ensemble of tenements for rental, designed in such a way they could in future be extended ad infinitum. In the Rue Saint-Lazare, around a commercial warehouse, he designed the gardens of Zephyr and Flora, which were illustrated by Hubert Robert.

=== Architecture for the ferme générale ===
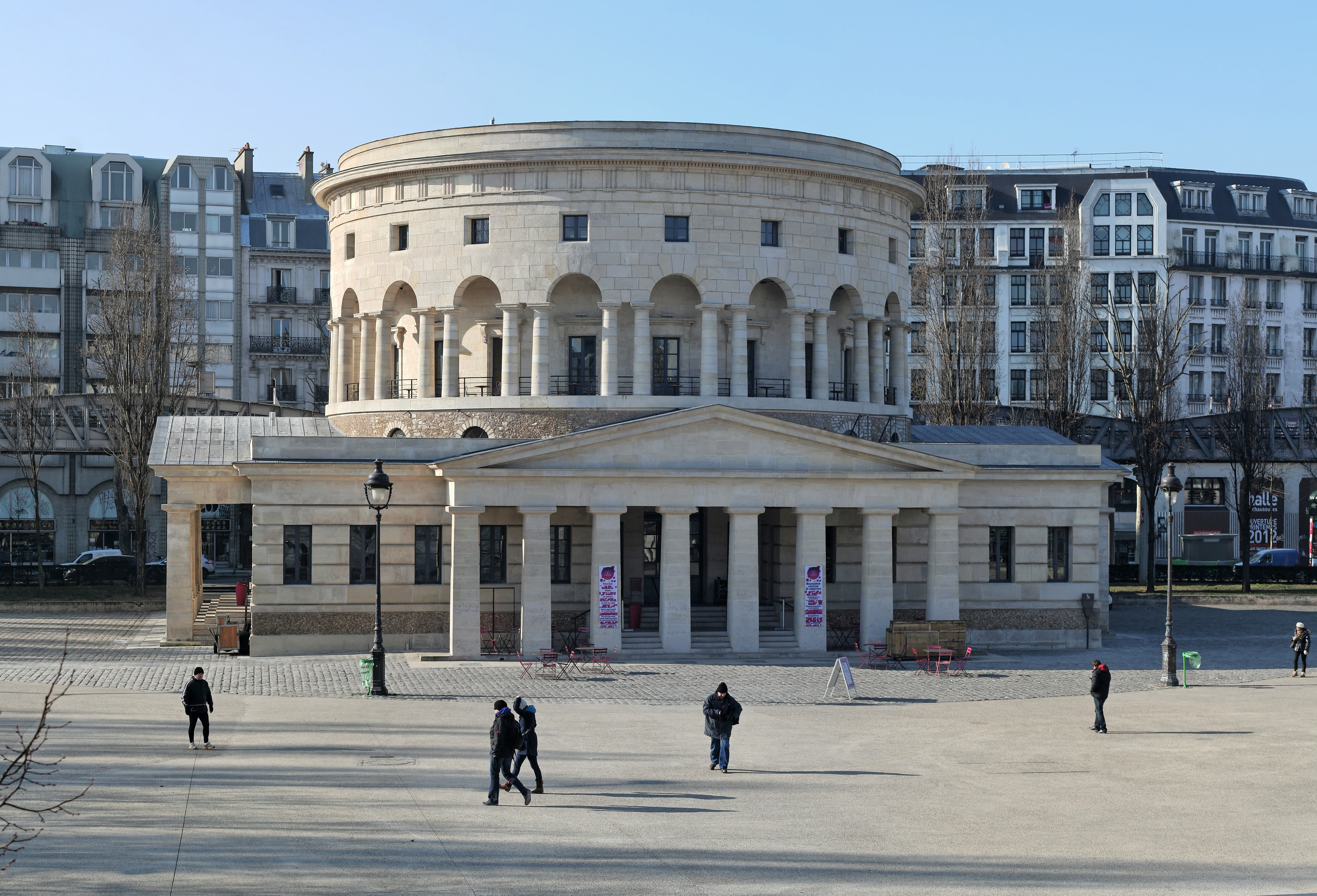
Rotonde de la Villette at Place de Stalingrad, old station of the Wall of the Farmers-General

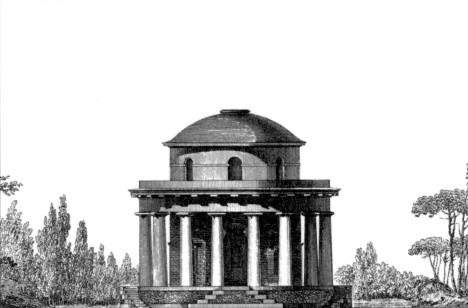
Rotonde de Chartres (today: entrance to the Monceau park)

During his work in Franche-Comté, Ledoux had become an architect for the ferme générale, for whom he built a salt storehouse in Compiègne and undertook to plan their vast headquarters on the rue du Bouloi in Paris.

Charles Alexandre de Calonne, the Controller-General of Finances, obtained on an idea from the chemist and fermier général Antoine Lavoisier, of drawing a barrier around Paris to limit contraband and evasion of the octrois, or internal customs duties: this wall of the Fermiers généraux was to have six towers (one every 4 kilometers) and to comprise sixty tax-collecting offices. Ledoux was charged with designing these buildings, which he baptized "les Propylées de Paris" and to which he wanted to give a character of solemnity and magnificence while putting into practice his ideas on the necessary links between form and function.

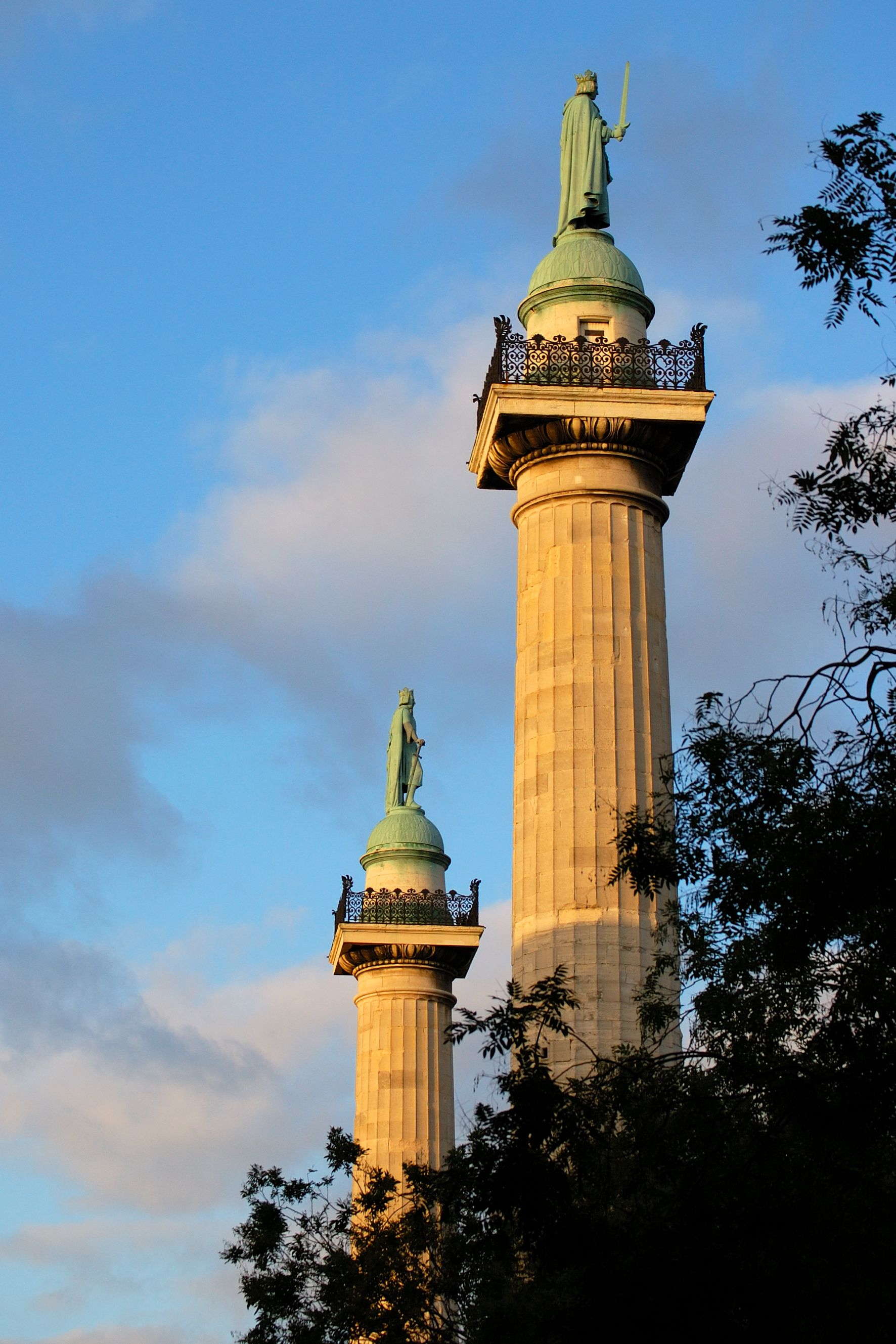
Barrière du Trône near the Place de la Nation

To cut short the protests of the Parisian population, the operation was carried out rapidly: fifty barriers to access were built between 1785 and 1788. Most were destroyed in the nineteenth century and very few remain today, of which those of La Villette and Place Denfert-Rochereau are the only ones that haven't been altered beyond recognition. In certain cases, the entry was framed with two identical buildings; in others, it consisted of a single building. The forms were archetypal: the rotunda (Heap, Reuilly); the rotunda surmounting a Greek cross (La Villette, Rapée); the cube with peristyle (Picpus); the Greek temple (Gentilly, Courcelles); the column (le Trône). At Place de l'Étoile, the buildings, flanked with columns alternating with cubic and cylindrical elements, evoked the House of the director at Arc-and-Senans; at the Bureau des Bonshommes, an apse opened by a peristyle recalled the pavilion of Madame du Barry and the Hôtel de la Guimard. The order employed was generally Doric Greek. Ledoux also used multiple rustic embossings.

This audacious construction met with political criticism, as well as aesthetic criticism of the architect, accused by commentators such as Jacques-Antoine Dulaure and Quatremère de Quincy of taking excessive freedoms with the ancient canons. Bachaumont denounced a "monument d'esclavage et de despotisme" (a "monument to enslavement and despotism"). In his Tableau de Paris (1783), Louis-Sébastien Mercier stigmatised "les antres du fisc métamorphosés en palais à colonnes" ("the bastions of taxation metamorphosed into columned palaces"), and exclamed, "Ah! Monsieur Ledoux, vous êtes un terrible architecte!"(Ah! Monsieur Ledoux, you are a terrible architect). Ledoux, rendered the object of scandal by these opinions, was relieved of his official functions in 1787 while Jacques Necker, succeeding Calonne, disavowed the entire enterprise.

=== Difficult times ===
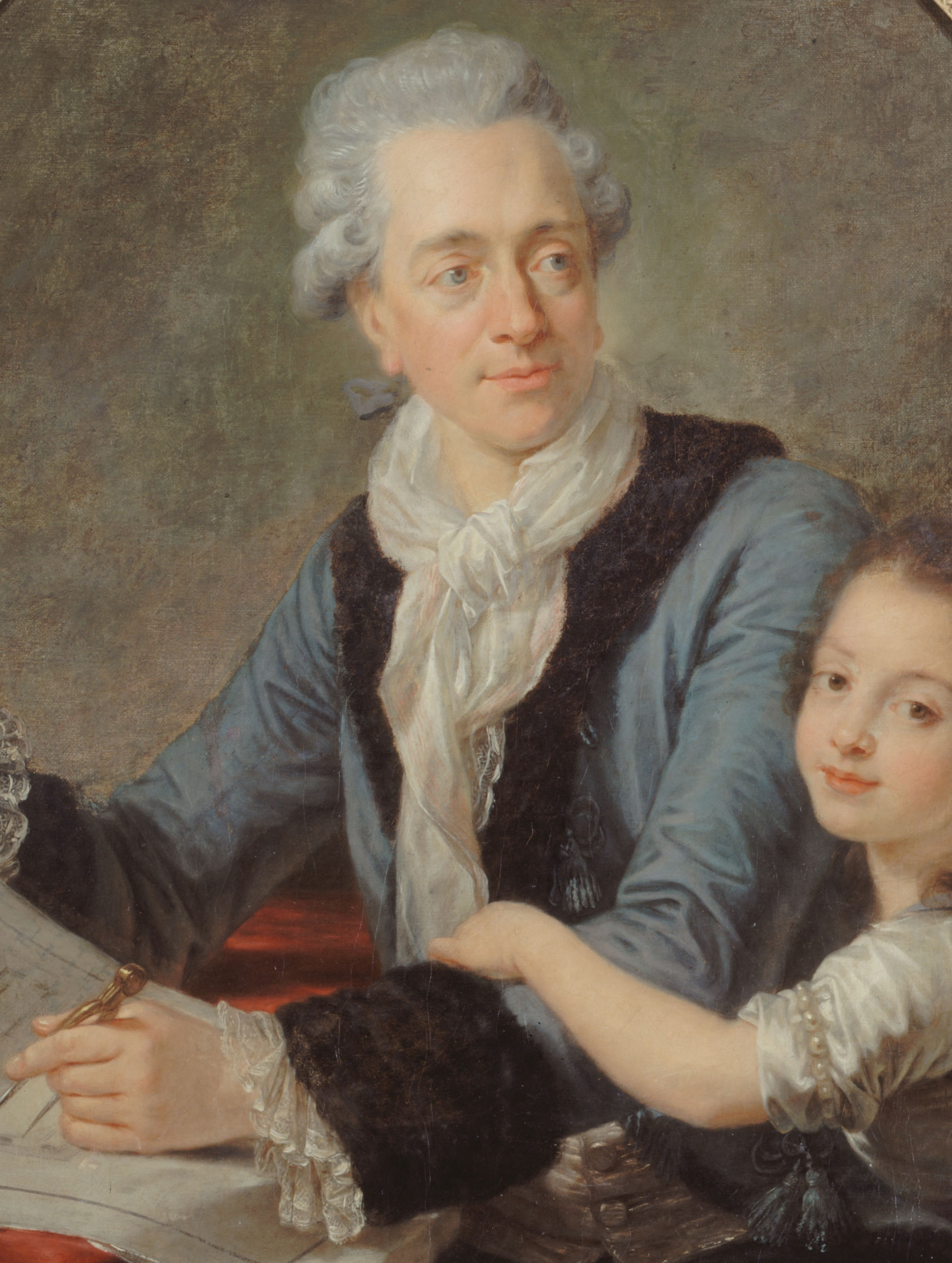
Portrait of Ledoux with his daughter. 1782 - Musée Carnavalet.

At the same time, work on the law courts of Aix-en-Provence was suspended, and Ledoux was accused of embroiling the Treasury in ill-considered expenditure. When the Revolution broke out, his rich clientele emigrated or perished under the guillotine. He saw his career and his projects stopped while at the same time the first blows of the pickaxe began to ring on the already obsolete wall of the fermiers généraux. As of June 1790, the Ferme générale had been able to install its employees in the buildings by Ledoux, but the octroi (granting) was abolished in May 1791, which rendered the facilities useless. A symbol of fiscal oppression, Ledoux, who had amassed a handsome fortune, was arrested and thrown in La Force Prison.

He still made a project for a school of agriculture for the duc de Duras, his companion in captivity. Perhaps the intervention of the painter Jacques-Louis David, son-in-law of the entrepreneur Pécoul, and considerably enriched in the collection of the octrois, helped him avoid the guillotine. But he lost his favourite daughter whilst the other brought a lawsuit against him.

Ledoux, who was eventually released, ceased building and attempted to prepare the publication of his complete œuvre. Since 1773, he had started to engrave his constructions and his projects but, because of the evolution of his style, he did not cease retouching his drawings, and the engravers constantly had to redo their boards. Ledoux evolved towards an architecture always more detailed and colossal, with vast walls that were increasingly smooth, and with increasingly rare openings. The differences between a drawing of the Pavillon de Louveciennes as it first was, made by the British architect Sir William Chambers and the engraving that was published in 1804 illustrate this process.

During his imprisonment, Ledoux had started to write a text to accompany the engravings. Only the first volume appeared during his lifetime, in 1804, under the title L'Architecture considérée sous le rapport de l'art, des mœurs et de la législation(Architecture considered under the relation of art and legislation). It presented the theatre of Besançon, the saltworks of Arc-and-Senans and the town of Chaux.

He died in Paris in 1806.

=== Utopianism ===
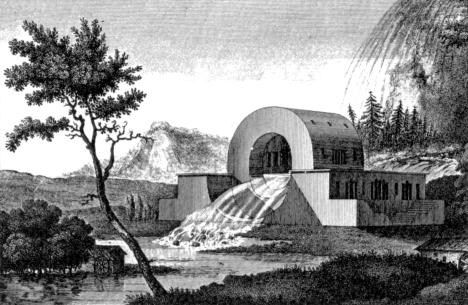
Project for the ideal city of Chaux: House of supervisors of the source of the Loue. Published in 1804.

Around the time of the royal saltworks, Ledoux formalized his innovative design ideas for an urbanism and an architecture intended to improve society, of an ideal city charged with symbols and meanings. Along with Étienne-Louis Boullée and his project for the Cenotaph of Newton, he is considered a precursor to the utopians who would follow. Boullée and Ledoux were a specific influence on subsequent Greek Revival architects and especially Benjamin Henry Latrobe who carried through the style in the United States for public architecture with the intention that the spirit of the ancient Athenian democracy would be echoed by buildings serving the new democracy of the United States of America.

After 1775 he presented Turgot with the first sketches of the town of Chaux, centered on the royal saltworks. The project, constantly perfected but never executed, was engraved beginning in 1780. The engravings, announced in 1784 and probably all designed by 1799, were finally published in 1804, as part of the first edition of his L'Architecture considerée.

As a radical utopian of architecture, teaching at the École des Beaux-Arts, he created a singular architectonic order, a new column formed of alternating cylindrical and cubic stones superimposed for their plastic effect. In this period, taste was returning to the antique, to the distinction and the examination, of the taste for the "rustic" style.

== Works ==
=== Constructions ===
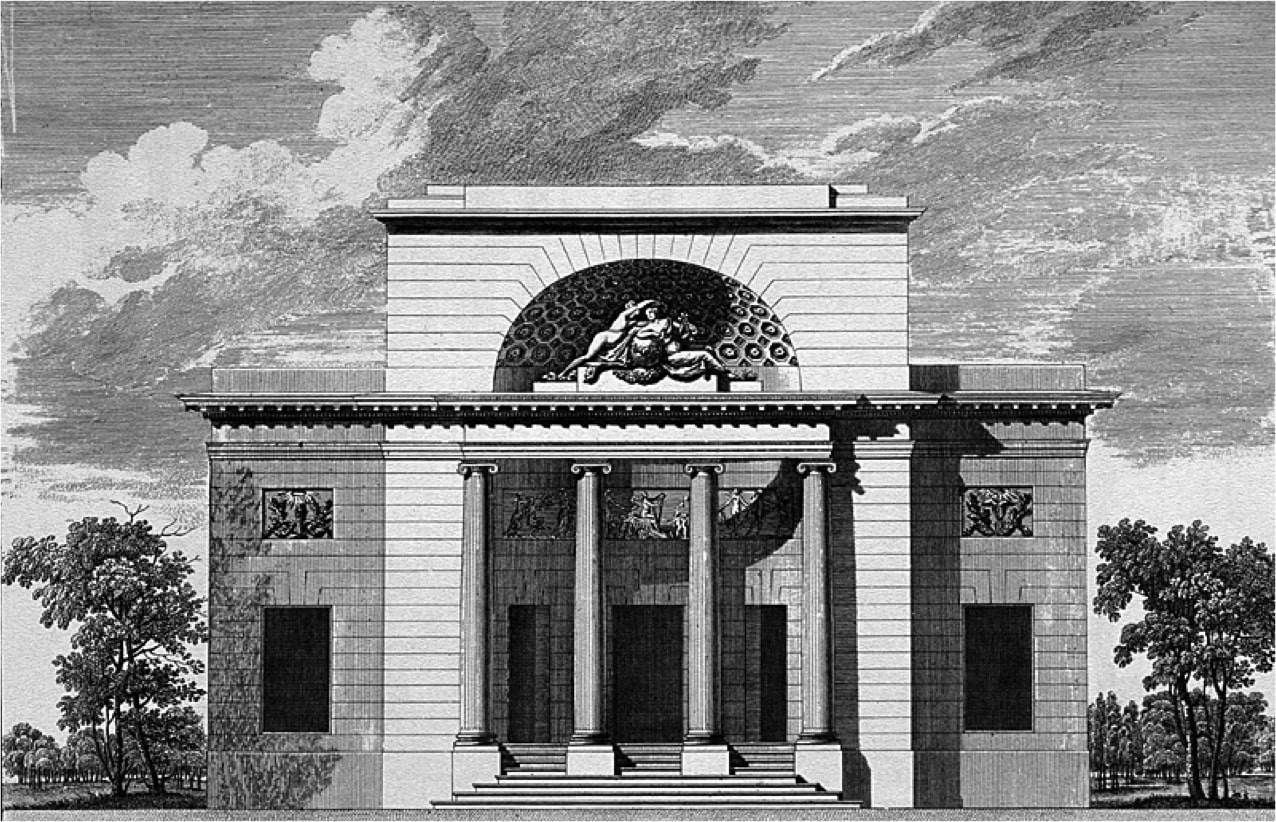
Hôtel de Mlle Guimard - Elevation

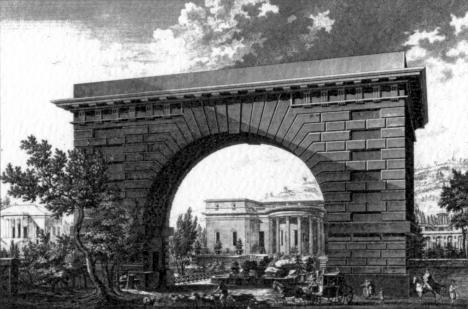
Hôtel de Thélusson, 1778

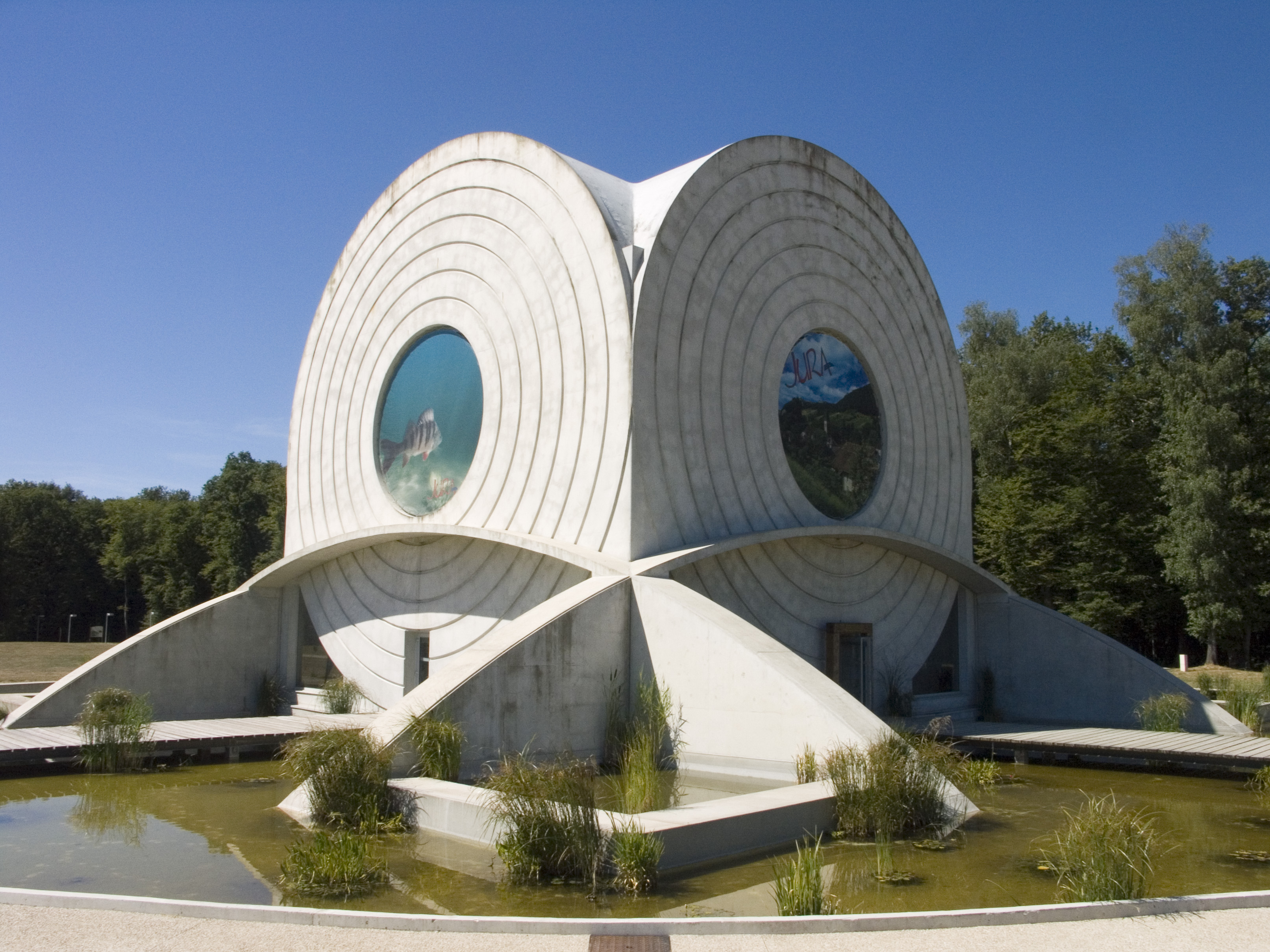
The Pavillon of Cercles, On the A39

- Decoration of Café militaire (or Café Godeau), rue Saint-Honoré, Paris, 1762 (Musée Carnavalet, Paris)
- Château de Mauperthuis (Seine-et-Marne), 1763 (destroyed)
- Hôtel du président Hocquart, 66 rue de la Chaussée-d'Antin, Paris, 1764-1765 (destroyed)
- Hôtel d'Hallwyll, 28 rue Michel-le-Comte and 15 rue de Montmorency, Paris, 1766: It is the only private construction of Ledoux which remains in the capital.
- Hôtel d'Uzès, rue Montmartre, Paris, 1767 (détruit vers 1870): The boiseries du salon de compagnie have been conserved since 1968 at the Carnavalet Museum.
- Château de Bénouville, Bénouville, Calvados (near Caen), 1768-1769: Property of the general council of the Calvados, at the present it houses the chambre régionale des comptes.
- Hôtel de la présidente de Gourgues, 53 rue Saint-Dominique, Paris (reconstructed)
- Hôtel of Mlle Guimard, Chaussée-d'Antin, Paris (destroyed)
- Maison de Mlle Saint-Germain, rue Saint-Lazare, Paris, 1769-1770 (destroyed)
- Pavillon Saint-Lambert, Eaubonne (destroyed)
- Pavillon d'Attilly, faubourg Poissonnière, Paris, 1771 (destroyed)
- Pavillon de musique de Mme du Barry, Louveciennes, 1770–1771
- Hôtel de Montmorency, intersection of rue de la Chaussée-d'Antin and boulevard, Paris, 1772 (destroyed) : The woodwork of the circular salon are preserved at the Boston Museum of Fine Arts.
- Royal Saltworks at Arc-et-Senans (1774–1779) (classified as monuments historiques of France and a World Heritage Site of UNESCO in 1982)
- Théâtre de Besançon, 1778–1784
- Hôtel Thellusson, rue de Provence, Paris, 1778 (destroyed in 1826 at the time the prolongation of rue Laffitte)
- Hôtel de Mme d'Espinchal, Rue des Petites-Écuries (Paris), Paris (destroyed)
- Parc de Bourneville, La Ferté-Milon (Aisne)
- Grenier à sel of Compiègne (Oise)
- Siège de la Ferme générale, rue du Bouloi, Paris
- Pavillons et barrières de l'Octroi de Paris (see Wall of the Farmers-General) (1785).

=== Projects ===
Some of his other "visionary" designs:

- Project of the town of Chaux, around the Royal Saltworks at Arc-et-Senans, published in 1804:
  - Overall plan
  - Market
  - House of the gardener
- Project for the prison and law courts of Aix-en-Provence, 1785–1786
- The project of immeuble-loyer, 1792

=== Publications ===
In 1804 was published a volume including the works from 1768 to 1789 : L'Architecture considérée sous le rapport de l'art, des mœurs et de la législation.

== Bibliography ==
- Braham, Allan (1980). The Architecture of the French Enlightenment. Berkeley and Los Angeles: University of California Press. ISBN 9780520067394.
- Eriksen, Svend (1974). Early Neo-Classicism in France, translated by Peter Thornton. London: Faber.
- Gallet, Michel (1980). Claude-Nicolas Ledoux (1736–1806). Paris.
- Gallet, Michel (1982). "Ledoux, Claude Nicolas", vol. 2, pp. 648–654, in Macmillan Encyclopedia of Architects, edited by Adolf K. Placzek. London: Collier Macmillan. ISBN 9780029250006.
- Gallet, Michel (1991). Architecture de Ledoux, inédits pour un tome III. Paris.
- Gallet, Michel (1995). Les architectes parisiens du XVIII siècle : dictionnaire biographique et critique. Paris: Mengès. ISBN 9782856203705.
- Kaufmann, Emil (1952). Three Revolutionary Architects, Boullée, Ledoux and Lequeu. Philadelphia.
- Levallet-Haug, Geneviève (1934). Claude-Nicolas Ledoux, 1736-1806. Paris and Strasbourg.
- Lyonnet, Jean-Pierre (2013). Les Propylées de Paris, Claude-Nicolas Ledoux. Editions Honoré Clair ISBN 978-2-918371-16-8.
- Mallgrave, Harry Francis (2005). Architectural Theory: An Anthology from Vitruvius to 1870 Blackwell Publishing. ISBN 1-4051-0257-8.
- Moreux, J.-Ch.; Raval, Marcel (1945). Claude-Nicolas Ledoux, architecte du Roi. Paris.
- Palmer, Allison Lee (2011). Historical Dictionary of Neoclassical Art and Architecture. Lanham, Maryland: Scarecrow Press. ISBN 9780810874749.
- Rabreau, Daniel (2005). Claude Nicolas Ledoux, Monum, Paris. ISBN 2-85822-846-9.
- Vidler, Anthony (1987). Ledoux. Paris: Editions Hazan. ISBN 9782850251252. Foreign Editions: Berlin, 1989; Tokyo, 1989; Madrid, 1994.
- Vidler, Anthony (1990). Claude-Nicolas Ledoux: Architecture and Social Reform at the End of the Ancien Régime. Cambridge (Mass.) and London: The MIT Press. ISBN 9780262220323.
- Vidler, Anthony (1996). "Ledoux, Claude-Nicolas", vol. 19, pp. 55–58, in The Dictionary of Art, 34 volumes, edited by Jane Turner, reprinted with minor corrections in 1998. New York: Grove. ISBN 9781884446009. Also at Oxford Art Online (subscription required).
- Vidler, Anthony (2006). Claude-Nicolas Ledoux: Architecture and Utopia in the Era of the French Revolution. Basel: Birkhäuser. ISBN 3-7643-7485-3.
