= Claude-Jean-François Despréaux =

French musician

Claude-Jean-François Despréaux was a French musician and revolutionary, born in the 1740s and died in Paris on 11 August 1794.

== Biography ==
The son of Jean-François Despréaux, oboist of the Académie royale de musique who retired in 1767, and Marie-Anne d'Arras, Louis-Félix's older brother (1746–1813) and Jean-Étienne Despréaux, Despréaux made his debut in 1759 as violinist. After he became head of the concertmasters in 1771, he retired in 1782.

A pensioner of the Republic, he was a civil commissioner and a member of the popular society of the section de Brutus, and juror at the Revolutionary Tribunal in 1793.

Desperate following the Fall of Maximilien Robespierre, he committed suicide with a shotgun in his apartment, at 20 rue du Sentier, on 24 thermidor an II (11 August 1794).

He is the author of several sonatas for violin and harpsichord.
