= Moonlight (painting) =

Painting by Philip James de Loutherbourg

- Clair de lune (French)
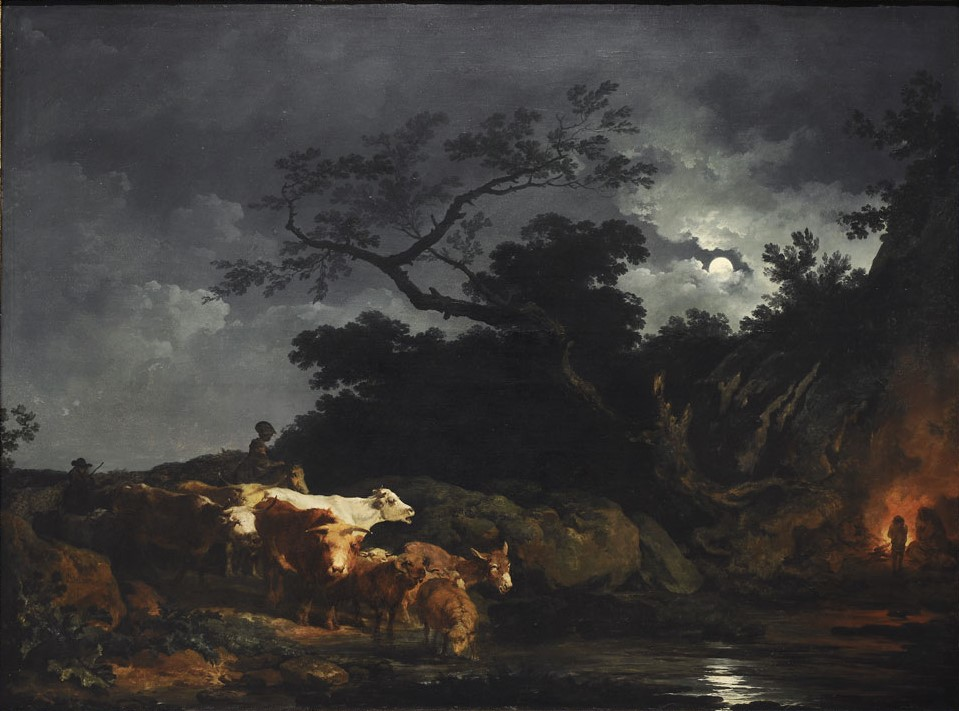
- Artist: Philip James de Loutherbourg
- Year: 1777
- Medium: oil painting on canvas
- Movement: Nocturne; Animal painting Landscape painting
- Subject: cattle drinking from a river by moonlight
- Dimensions: 56.5 cm × 72 cm (22.2 in × 28 in)
- Location: Musée des Beaux-Arts; Strasbourg
- Accession: 1967

Moonlight is a 1777 nocturne by Philip James de Loutherbourg. It is now in the Musée des Beaux-Arts of Strasbourg, France. Its inventory number is 2312.

The painting was painted ten years after Landscape with Animals, a much larger canvas that Loutherbourg exhibited to great acclaim in Paris, and six years after the painter's moving to London. Moonlight was shown in the Royal Academy of Arts in 1778, equally to great acclaim. Loutherbourg does not depict a real scenery but two sources of light and shadows (moonlight and fire), as well as two types of reflective surface (animal skin and water). The result is a highly artificial virtuoso piece, in which (as he often did) Loutherbourg attempts to surpass his elder rival Claude Joseph Vernet.
