= Marcille =

Marcille is a surname. Notable people with the surname include:

- Eudoxe Marcille (1814–1890), French painter, museum director, art school director, and art collector
- Eva Marcille (born 1984), American actress, model, and television personality
