= A Mediterranean Port =

Painting by Claude Joseph Vernet

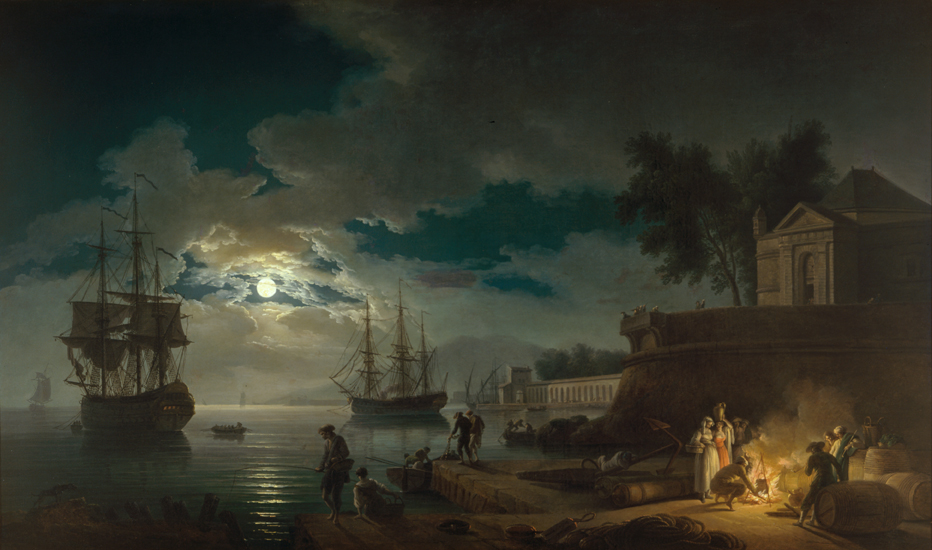
- Artist: Claude Joseph Vernet
- Year: c. 1771
- Medium: oil on canvas
- Dimensions: 97.3 cm × 163.8 cm (38.3 in × 64.5 in)
- Location: Museo Soumaya, Mexico City

A Mediterranean Port or A Sea Port by Moonlight refers to two 1771 paintings of the same subject by the French painter Claude Joseph Vernet. They are now in the Museo Soumaya in Mexico City and the Louvre in Paris.

== History ==
The two paintings form part of a series of fifteen works by Vernet showing port scenes. They were commissioned by Madame du Barry, who was trying to replace Madame de Pompadour as the greatest art patron among Louis XV's lovers. Vernet was one of a circle of artists which gathered around du Barry. The paintings were intended for a pavilion at the Chateau de Louveciennes. They resemble the same painter's Night: Mediterranean Coastal Scene with Fishermen and Boats (1753).

== Description ==
In the foreground, a group of people is gathered around the heat of a fire. The objects nearby reaffirm the environment in which they are found, and in parallel there are several people fishing. The colors and textures present reflect a calm environment. In the background, the figure of the moon predominates, prolonged thanks to the pale light that is reflected on the tenuous waves of the liquid surface of the sea and among the clouds. There is in fact a contrast of lights in the painting: the burning orange of the fure on the right and the cold light of the night on the left.
