= The Attributes of Civilian and Military Music =

Paintings by Jean Siméon Chardin

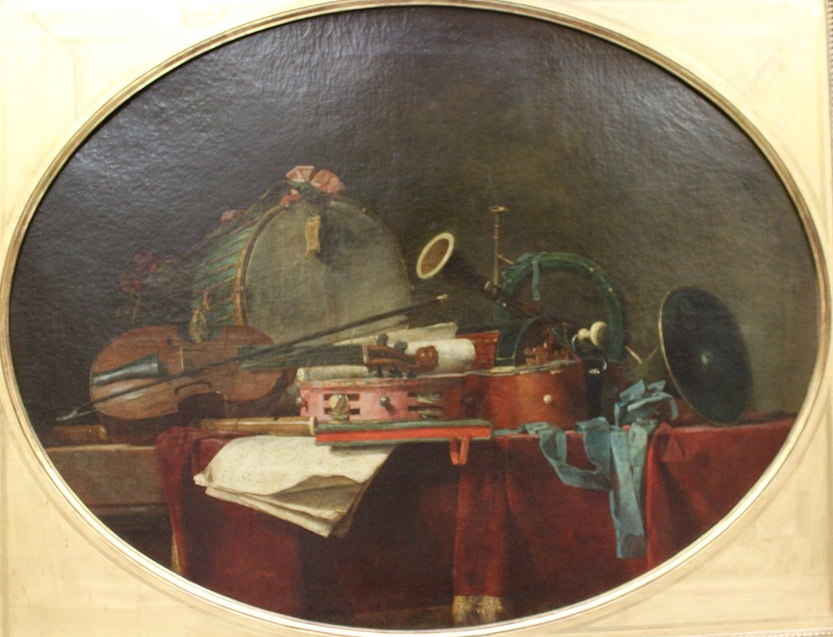
The Attributes of Civilian Music

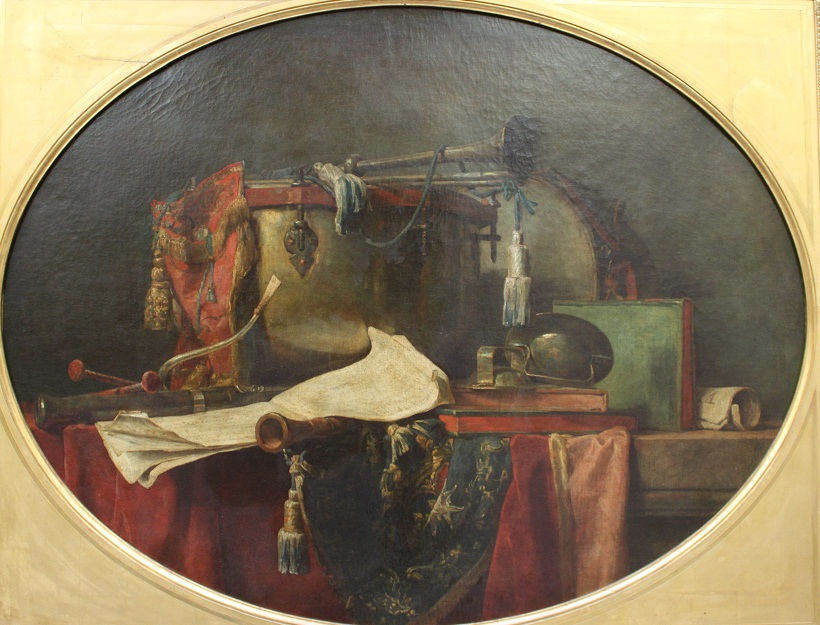
The Attributes of Military Music

The Attributes of Civilian Music and The Attributes of Military Music are a pair of oil-on-canvas paintings in oval format by Jean Siméon Chardin, commissioned in 1766 by Charles-Nicolas Cochin for the pediments above the doors to the music room in his Château de Bellevue at Meudon (Hauts-de-Seine). They were exhibited at the Salon of 1767 and installed in the Château the following year. The Château's goods were later confiscated by the state and the paintings were sold at auction. They were acquired by the portrait painter Jean-Sébastien Rouillard, then by François Marcille and his son Eudoxe. Via a gift from Eudoxe's descendants and from the Société des amis du Louvre, the Louvre Museum was able to purchase them in 2010.
