= Christophe-Gabriel Allegrain =

French sculptor (1710–1795)

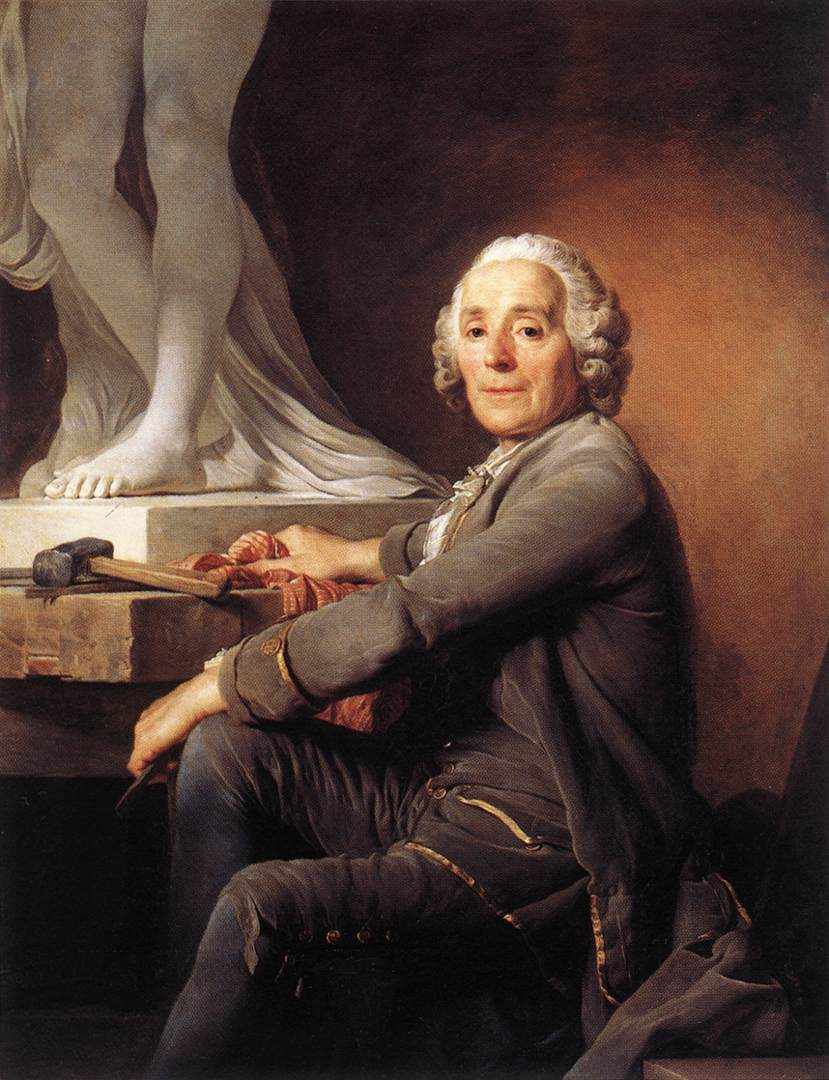
Christophe-Gabriel Allegrain, in a 1774 portrait by Joseph Duplessis.

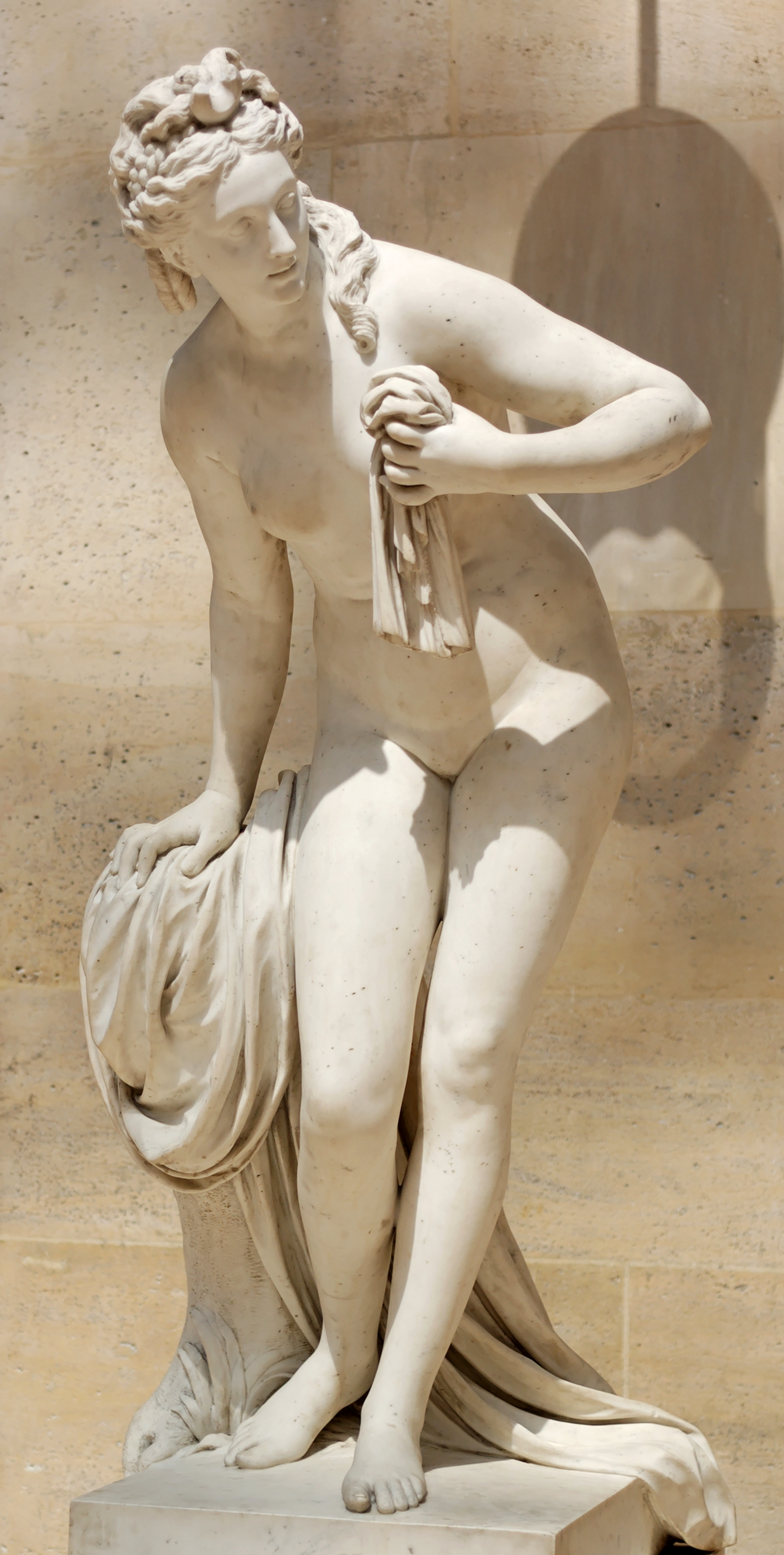
La Baigneuse (Diane), 1776-78, commissioned by Mme du Barry for Louveciennes

Christophe-Gabriel Allegrain (11 October 1710, Paris – 17 April 1795, Paris) was a French sculptor who tempered a neoclassical style with Rococo charm and softness, under the influence of his much more famous brother-in-law, Jean-Baptiste Pigalle.

== Biography ==
Allegrain was born into a well-established family of landscape painters in Paris. His single most famous work, a marble Bather (La Baigneuse), was commissioned for the royal residences through the Bâtiments du Roi in 1755; a modelled sketch was shown at the Salon of 1757. When the finished marble was finally exhibited at the Salon of 1767 it received a sensational reception. In 1772 Louis XV presented it to Mme du Barry for her Château de Louveciennes, where she had recently completed the famed pavilion that introduced the new Neoclassicism, usually associated with the "Louis Seize style", into court circles.

After the King's death she was pleased enough with it to commission from Allegrain a pendant bather in 1776, which he delivered in 1778 (illustration). presented in the landscape garden as Vénus and Diane they provided an allegory of her past sensual love and her present chaste condition. (Both are conserved in the Louvre Museum.) There are small-scale patinated bronze reproductions, and both pieces remained popular and often reproduced through the nineteenth century: in 1860, when the Goncourt brothers referred to "the refined legs of a Diana of Allegrain", their readers conjured up the familiar image.

His portrait by Joseph Duplessis, 1774, earned the painter a place in the Académie Royale de Peinture et de Sculpture. Among his pupils were his son and François-Dominique-Aimé Milhomme. He died in Paris.
