= A View of Ripetta =

Painting by Hubert Robert

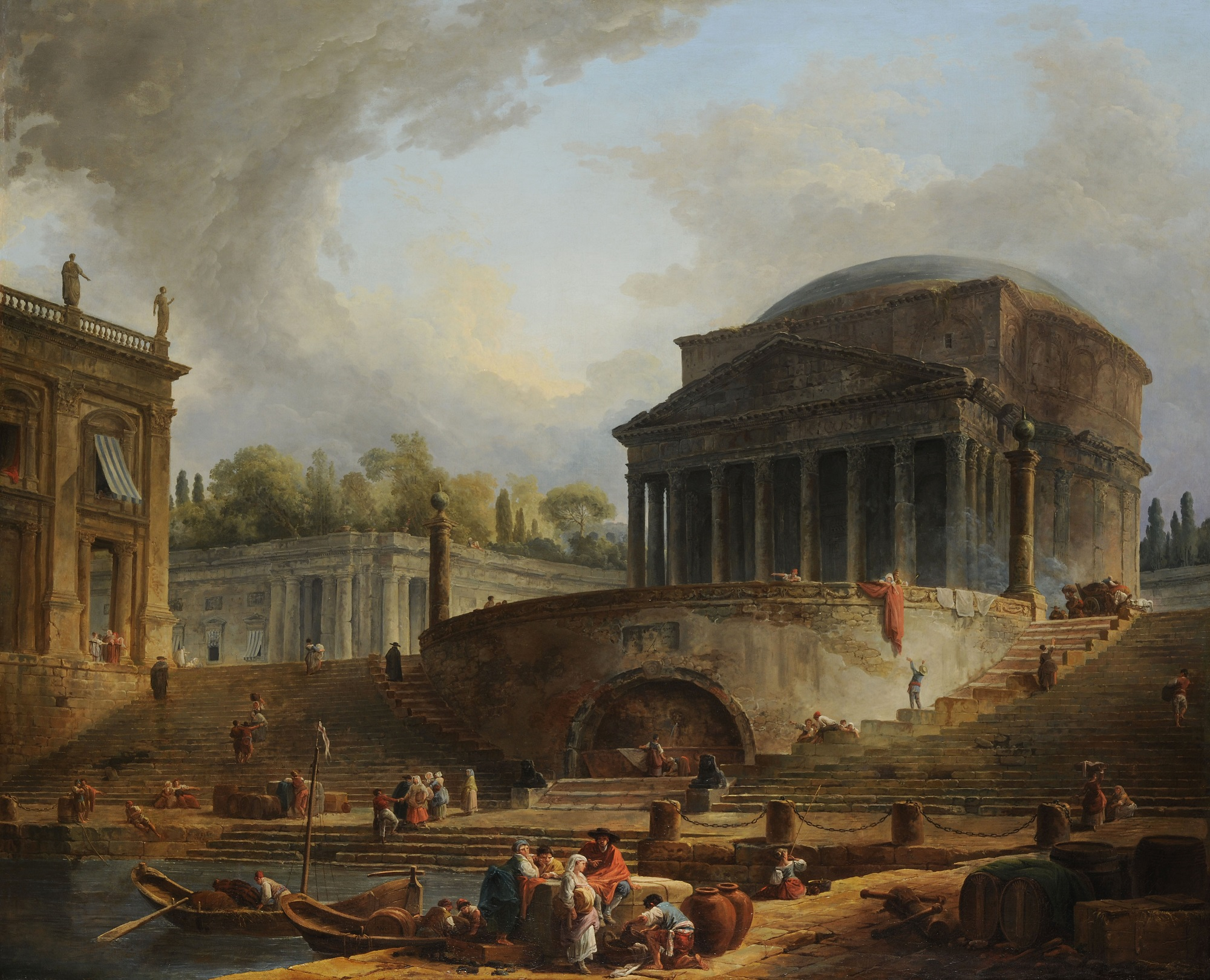
- Artist: Hubert Robert
- Year: 1766
- Type: Oil on canvas, landscape painting
- Dimensions: 119 cm × 145 cm (47 in × 57 in)
- Location: Beaux-Arts de Paris, Paris

A View of Ripetta is a 1766 landscape painting by the French artist Hubert Robert. A veduta, it depicts the historic Porto di Ripetta, a port that served the city of Rome. In capriccio style, it features the Pantheon immediately behind it. It was exhibited at the Salon of 1767 at the Louvre in Paris. Today it is part of the collection of the Beaux-Arts de Paris, having been acquired in 1884.

== Bibliography ==
- Adams, Steven. Landscape Painting in Revolutionary France: Liberty's Embrace. Routledge, 2019.
- Bowron, Edgar Peters & Rishel, Joseph J. Art in Rome in the Eighteenth Century. Merrell, 2000.
- Mayernik, David. The Challenge of Emulation in Art and Architecture: Between Imitation and Invention. Routledge, 2016.
