= Porto di Ripetta =

Coordinates: 41.9051°N 12.4750°E

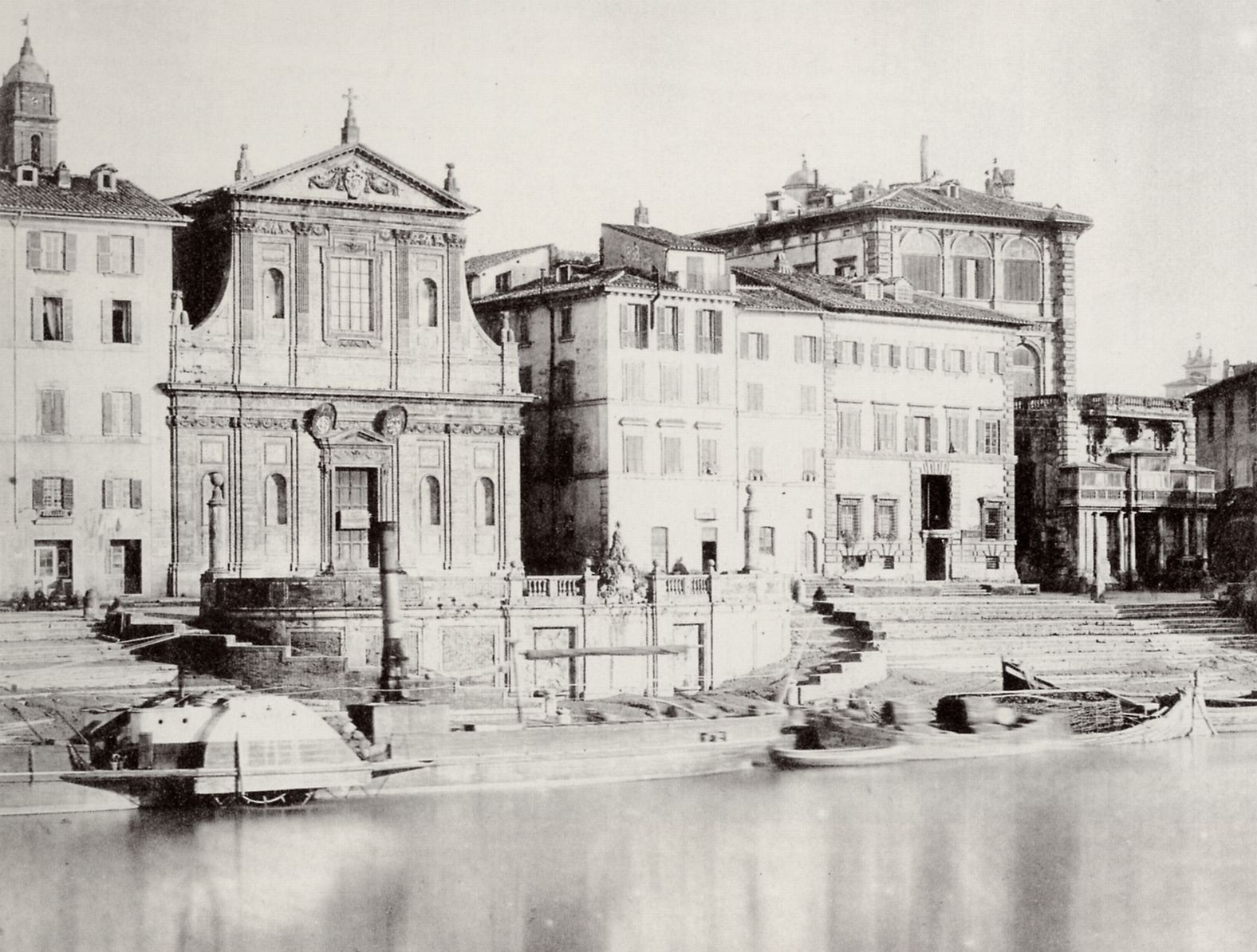
Photograph of the port in 1865

The Porto di Ripetta was a port in the city of Rome. It was situated on the banks of the River Tiber and was designed and built in 1704 by the Italian Baroque architect Alessandro Specchi. Located in front of the church of San Girolamo degli Schiavoni, its low walls with steps descended in sweeping scenographic curves from the street to the river. The port no longer exists but is known from engraved views, drawings and early photographs.

Situated on the left bank of the Tiber (as facing south), this was the place to alight for those coming downriver; the Porto di Ripa Grande on the other bank in Trastevere served those coming up from the seaward side of the city.

During the second half of the 19th century, the river banks and roads along the Tiber were radically reconstructed to improve the city's flooding defences and its transport connections. The new roads which flank the river were called Lungotevere.

In the area of the Porto di Ripetta, an iron bridge was constructed between 1877 and 1879 across the Tiber and adjacent to the port. This in turn led to the construction of another more substantial bridge, the Ponte Cavour, which was opened in 1901, and the Porto di Ripetta was demolished. Photographs from the late nineteenth century record the port, the iron bridge and the new Ponte Cavour.

Farther upstream along the lungotevere Arnaldo da Brescia on the left bank of the river, the ramps of the de Pinedo landing-stage (Italian: Scalo de Pinedo), built in the late nineteenth century to replace the port, echo in simplified form the latter's design.

== Gallery ==
Engraving by Giovanni Battista Piranesi (c. 1750)

Engraving by Giuseppe Vasi (1754)

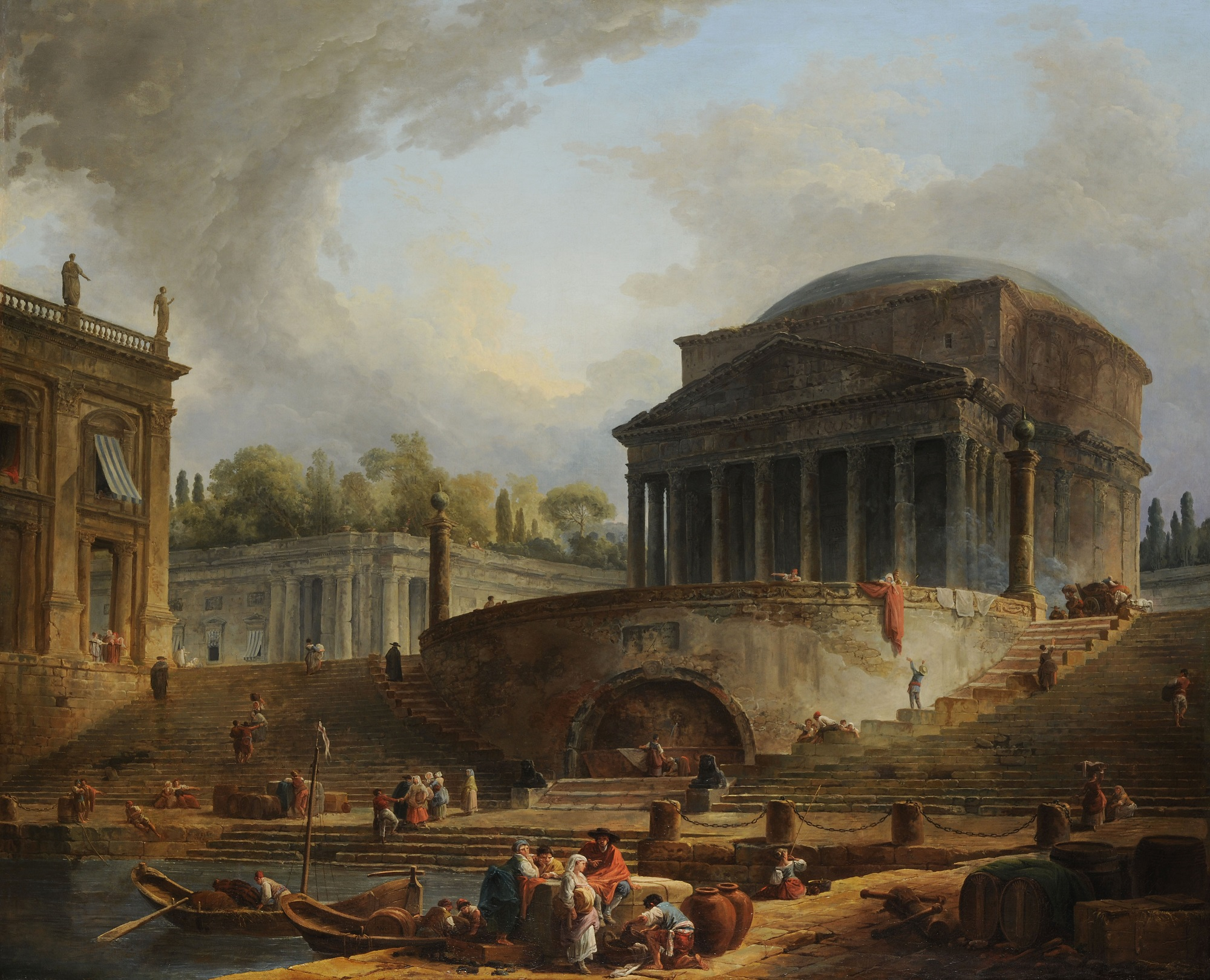
A View of Ripetta by Hubert Robert, (1766)

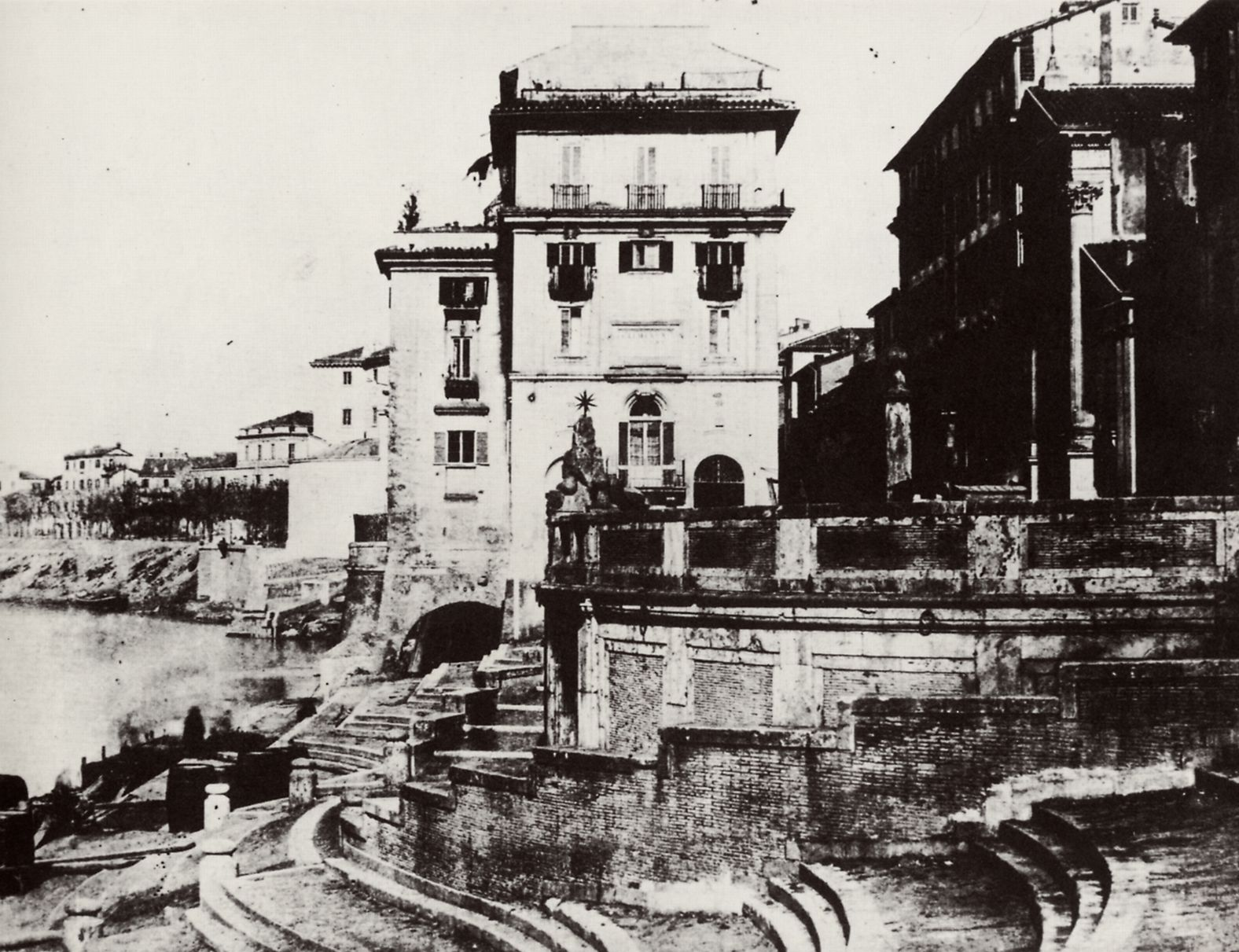
Photograph by Ludovico Tuminello (c. 1860)

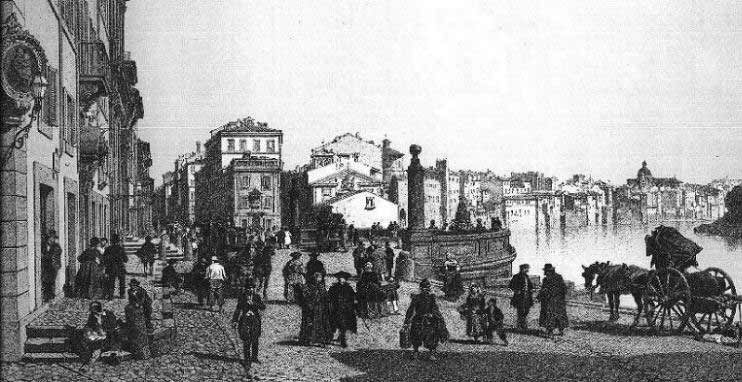
Lithography by Philippe Benoist (1870)
