= Château de Madame du Barry =

Château in Yvelines, France

Coordinates: 48°52′7″N 2°7′23″E

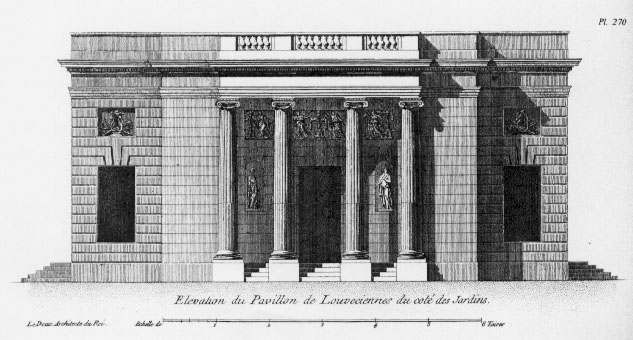
Pavillon de Musique – elevation of entry side (garden façade)

The Château de Madame du Barry is a château constructed at the end of the 17th century in Louveciennes, in the Yvelines department of France. It was expanded and redecorated in the middle of the 18th century by Ange-Jacques Gabriel for Madame du Barry. The estate's most famous building is the Pavillon de Musique, a music and reception pavilion constructed by Claude Nicolas Ledoux (1770–71). The pavilion sits in the middle of a park that was designed in the 19th century.

== The Château ==
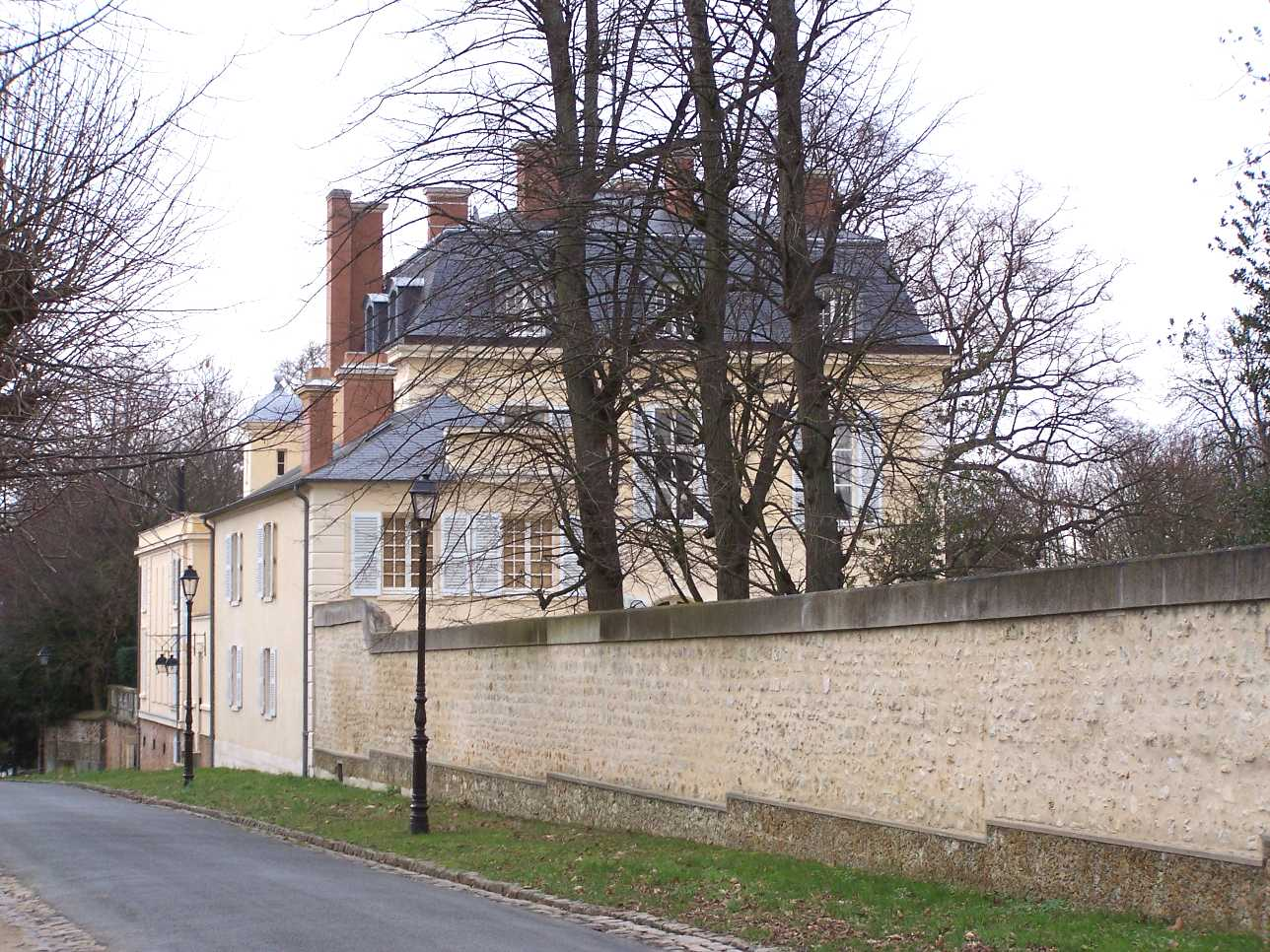
Pavillon des Eaux, later called Château de Madame du Barry – northern façade facing the chemin de la Machine

The château is an approximately cubic construction, of average size and modest appearance, which borders the chemin de la Machine, a favourite subject of the Impressionists Camille Pissarro and Alfred Sisley.

=== History ===
In 1684, Louis XIV ordered the construction of a château in the proximity of an aqueduct built to bring water drawn from the Seine by the Machine de Marly to the Château de Marly. The King gave the building, then called Pavillon des Eaux, to Baron Arnold de Ville, the engineer originally of Liège who had conceived the hydraulic installation. The building was later given to Louise-Françoise de Bourbon, the eldest legitimised daughter of Louis XIV and his mistress Françoise-Athénaïs, marquise de Montespan.

At Louise's death in 1743, the château passed to her daughter, Louise Élisabeth de Bourbon Princess of Conti, who introduced Madame de Pompadour to court. At some point, the building reverted to the crown.

It was then used by the Prince de Lamballe. Lamballe was heir to the vast wealth of the House of Bourbon-Penthièvre; he was brother-in-law to Louis Philippe Joseph d'Orléans (later Philippe Égalité) and the husband of Marie-Thérèse Louise of Savoy. He died at the château in 1768 of a venereal disease.

In 1769, Louis XV offered the château to his new favourite, Madame du Barry. She probably called upon Ange-Jacques Gabriel, Premier Architecte du Roi, to enlarge and redecorate the building. Gabriel added the adjoining eastern wing, as well as the decoration of carved woodwork. Louis XV often visited the château that had become known as the Château de Madame du Barry. It is there that, on 22 September 1793, Madame du Barry was arrested during the French Revolution.

In the 1980s, the château was acquired by a Japanese heiress, Nakahara Kiiko, and her Marseillais-born French-American husband, illegally using the name of her family's company Nippon Sangyo, as a commercial asset. The couple sold all the furniture and left the building abandoned. They were sued by the company later. Occupied by squatters, the château underwent various degradations. In 1994, an attempt to remove the joinery and a chimneypiece was thwarted by the police. The owner then put the property up for sale, and it was bought by a French investor who carefully restored it.

=== Gallery of Residents ===
Louis XIV

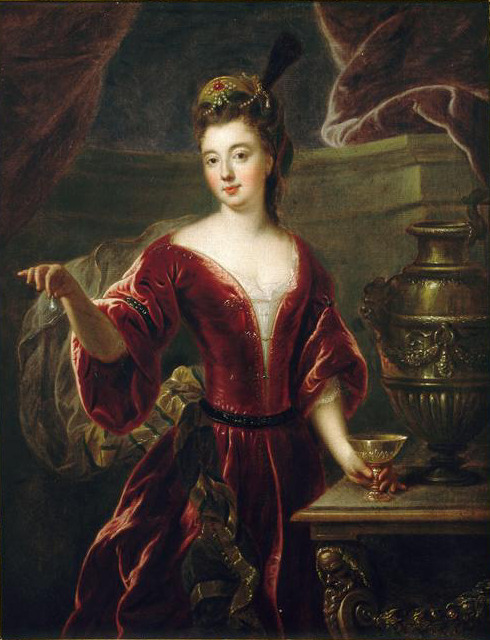
Louise-Françoise de Bourbon

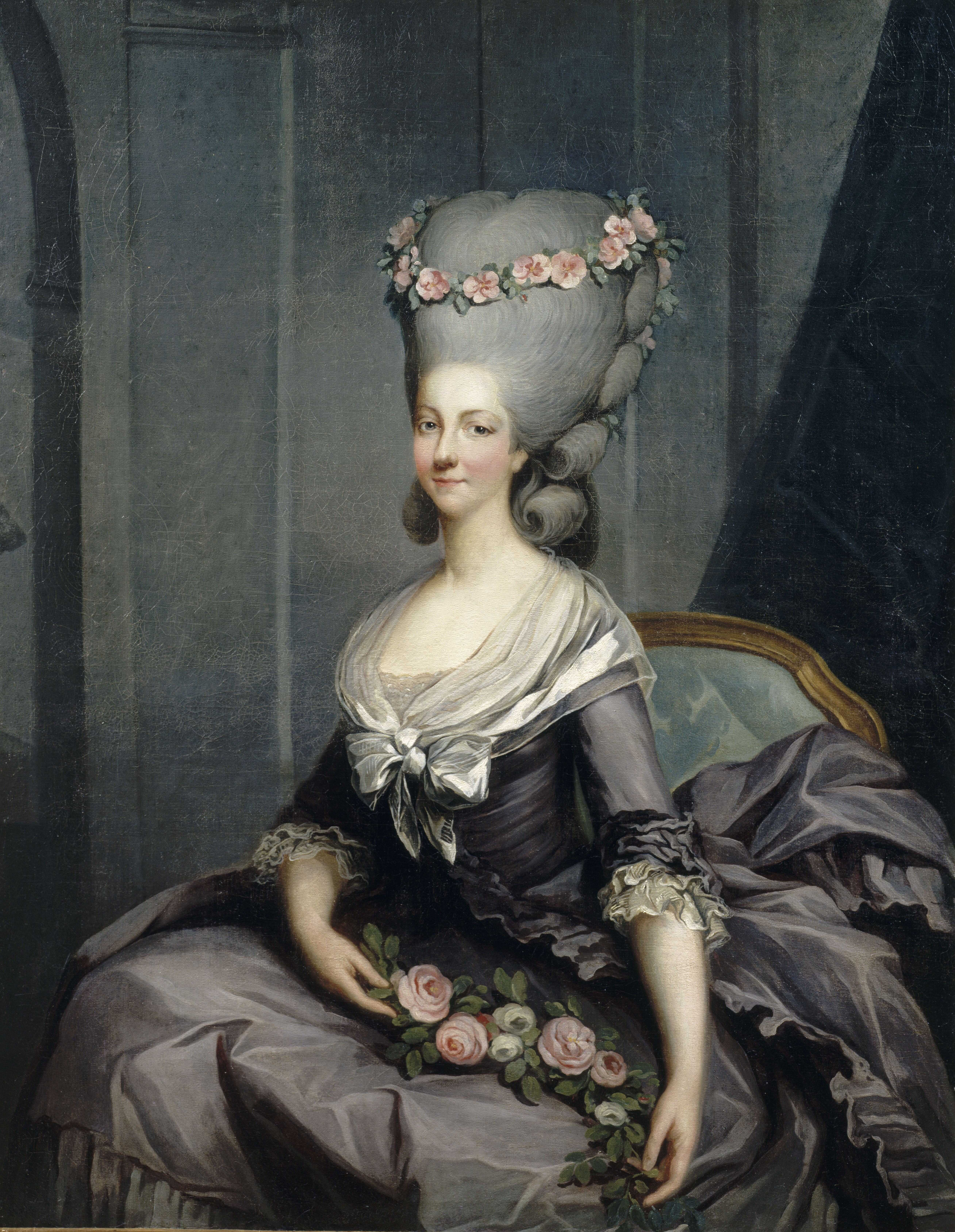
Princesse de Lamballe

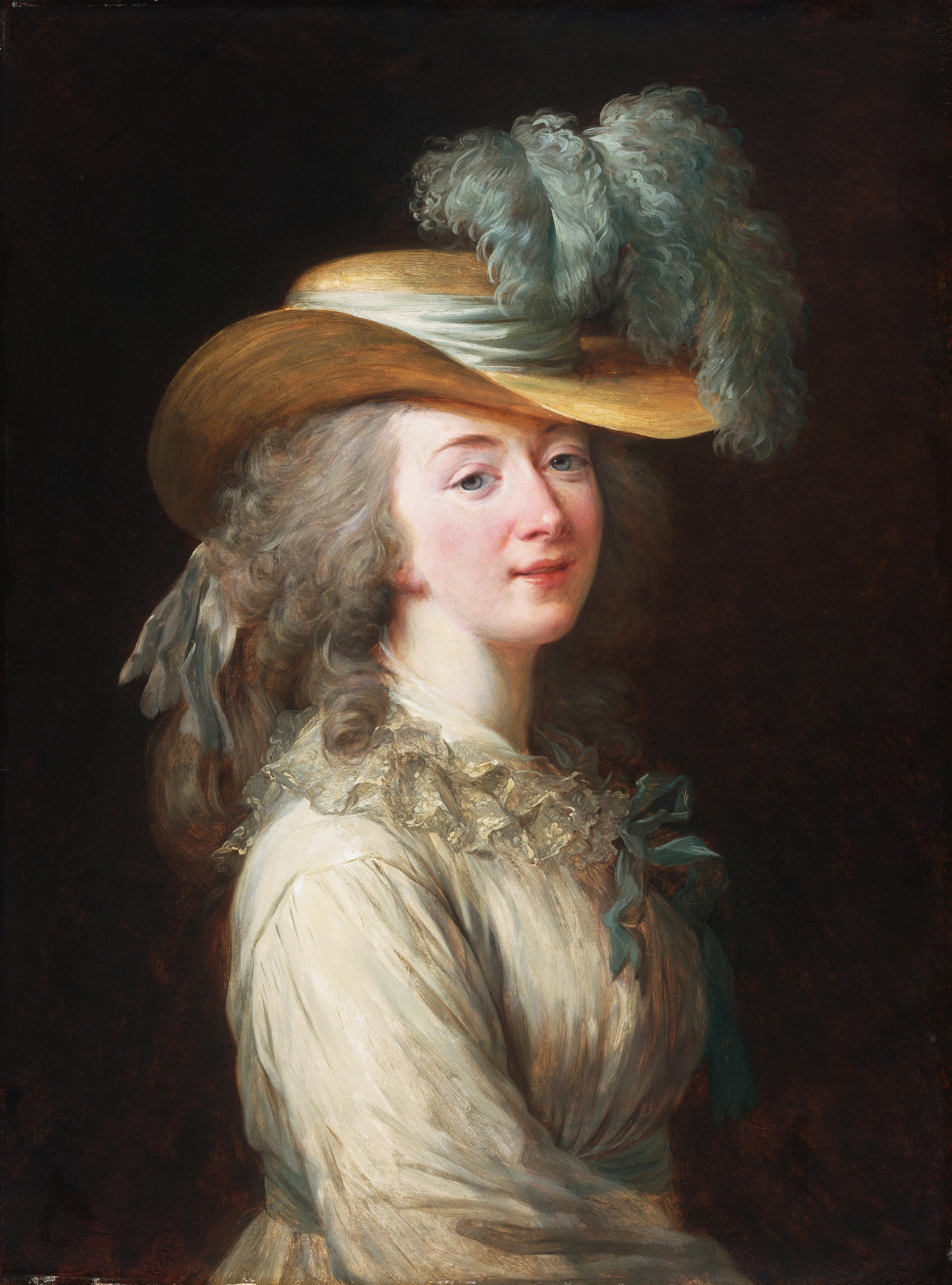
Madame du Barry by Vigée Le Brun 1783

== The Pavilion ==
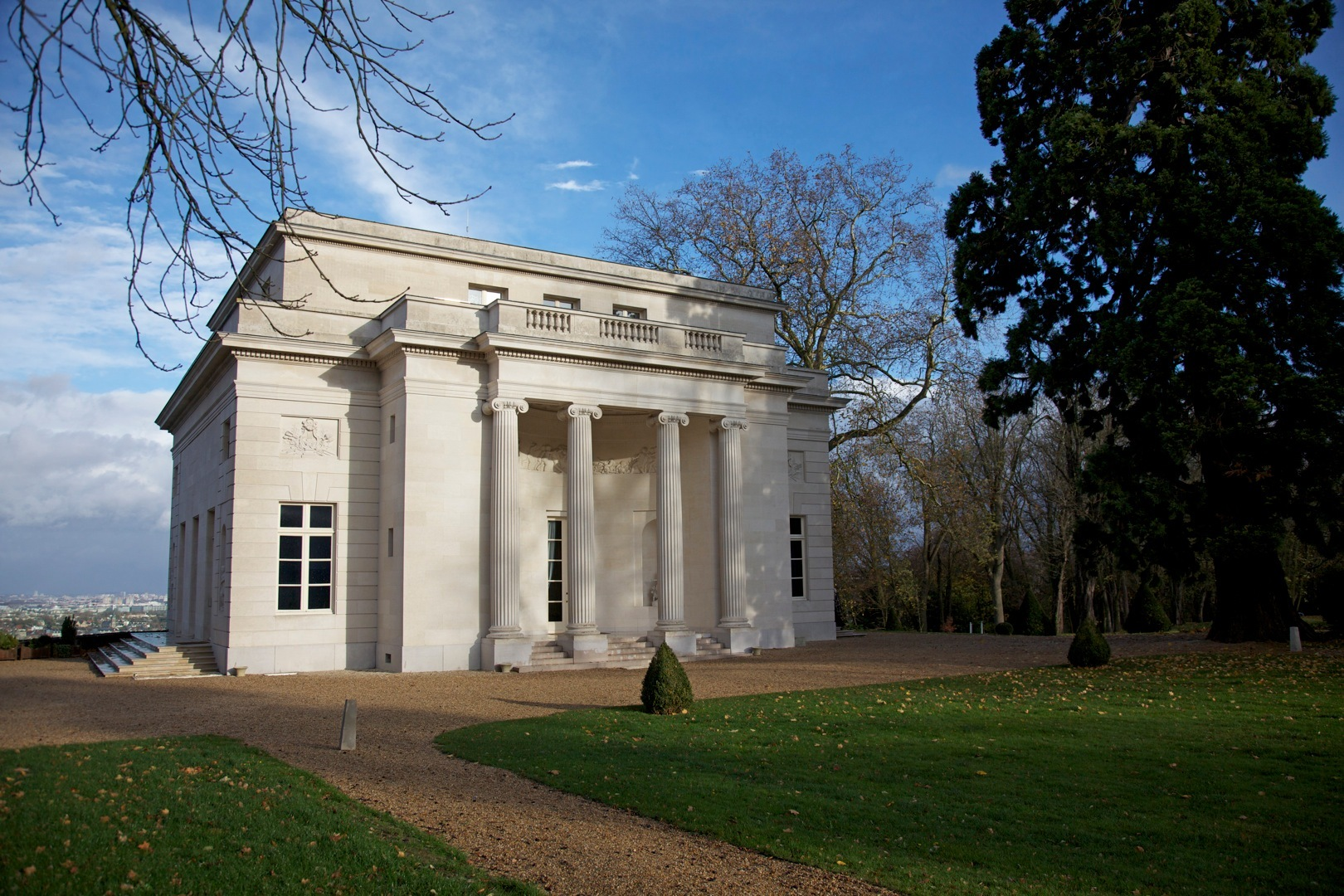
The Pavillon de Musique in 2009

The château was disadvantaged by its lack of a view of the Seine. Moreover, Madame du Barry considered the reception areas to be inadequate. She thus decided to build, surveying the valley of the Seine, a small separate building that would include reception rooms, the famous Pavillon de Musique de la Comtesse du Barry.

=== History ===
Proposals were requested of Charles de Wailly and Claude Nicolas Ledoux. In spite of the negative opinions given by several of her circle, notably Gabriel, Mme du Barry decided to retain Ledoux as the architect for the project. He was then at the beginning of his career. The design was completed in 1770 and construction was carried out in 1771. The inauguration took place on 2 September 1771 in the presence of the King. A play by Charles Collé was performed, La partie de chasse de Henri IV, and dinner was served with music (the musicians complained about the exiguity of the platforms of the dining room, now shut off by mirrors) followed by a display of fireworks.

In 1773, Mme du Barry, obviously satisfied with the pavilion, ordered from Ledoux the plans for a large château which was to incorporate the small building. The death of Louis XV in 1774 put an end to this project before it was begun. The pavilion thus remained in its original state until the second half of the 19th century. On an unspecified date, it was disfigured by the addition of a Mansard roof and shutters to the windows.

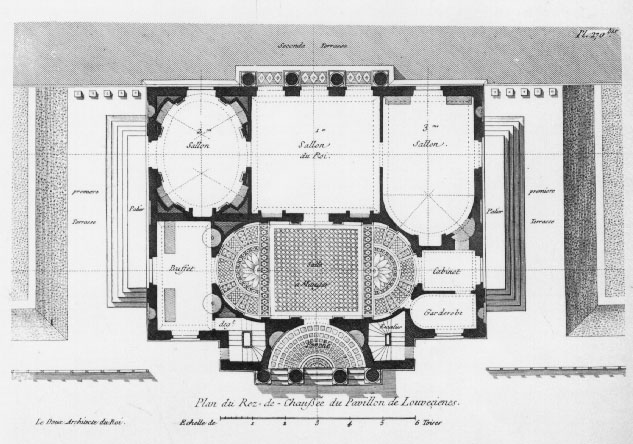
Ground floor plan showing the rich variety of shapes

When it was acquired in 1923 by the perfumer François Coty from the politician and industrial Louis Loucheur, the house was found to be subject to a grave disorder because of the sinking slope on which it was built. François Coty called upon the architect Charles Édouard Mewès, son of Charles Mewès (1860–1914) to displace it several meters. This radical solution saved the building from erosion of the slope, which would have entirely destroyed it within the next few years. The move was accompanied by profound transformations: the mansard roof was converted into an attic sheltering five bedrooms, while vast dependences were created in the basement to arrange a perfume laboratory, an electric generator, kitchens and a swimming pool.

In 1959, the house was bought by the American School of Paris, which then settled there. In cleaning the building some Nazi materials were found. The story was that while the Germans occupied the building in World War II, the French Resistance was active in the tunnels of the old stone quarries under the building. These quarries had provided some of the stone used to build Paris. The school wanted to expand by putting up new buildings but the underlying tunnels made the ground unstable. A project was initiated to pump cement into the tunnels but this was abandoned, and the American School moved to another site in Saint Cloud.

In 2022 the Pavilion was listed by Sotheby's at a asking price of 60 million euros, sadly not mentioning any of its history and provenance.

=== Architecture ===
The pavilion at Louveciennes is one of the most successful achievements of Ledoux and a prototype for Neoclassical architecture. The entry, in the form of an open semi-circular apse, with a coffered half-dome ceiling simply closed by a screen of Ionic columns, has a disposition already used by Ledoux in the house of Marie-Madeleine Guimard on the roadway of Antin.

The coffered domes would have been an astonishing feature to Parisians, Svend Eriksen has observed. It leads to a room which has the form of a square with apsidal ends, intended as a dining room, where the inaugural dinner took place. Behind this room is an enfilade of three living rooms, the central salon du Roi flanked by salons that are each of a different plan, opening onto the view of the Seine below. Various services and the kitchen were established in the rusticated half-basement.

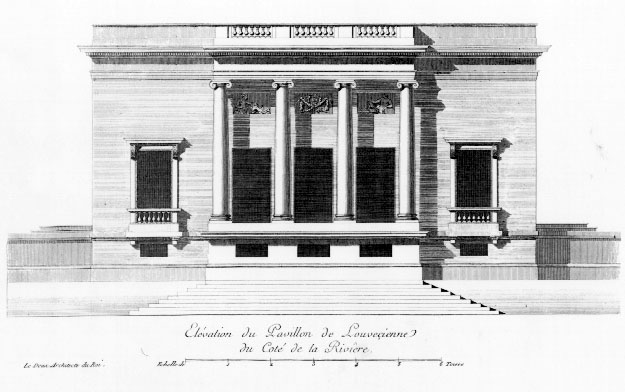
View on the side of the Seine River.

The side towards the Seine is known from a drawing made by the British neoclassicist Sir William Chambers: in Chambers' drawing, unlike Ledoux's commemorative engraving (illustration, right), its three central bays project in the accustomed Gabriel manner, with attached Ionic columns and bas-relief panels above the severely plain window openings; in the flanking single bays the windows have plain entablatures surmounted by low plinths of concave profile.

Ledoux's commemorative engraving of 1804 carries the severe façade right across, unbroken; Ledoux's drawings, executed long afterwards, cannot be trusted to represent the original appearance, according to Svend Eriksen, because the architect was in the habit of furnishing his drawings "with impossibly advanced features retrospectively." In either version the elevation reflects "Ledoux's efforts to accentuate the cuboidal structure of a building and to handle the Classical motifs with such precision and economy that the large, reticent wall-surfaces against which they are seen are rendered doubly significant and effective".

=== Interior decoration ===
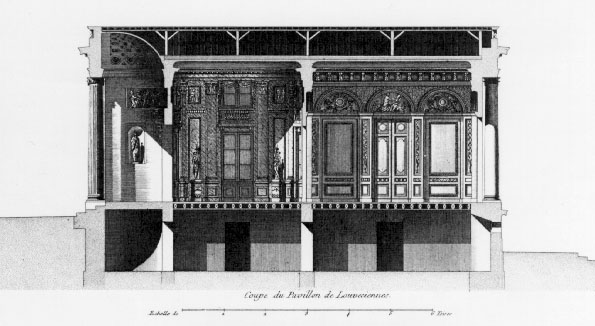
Cross-section of the entry and the salon du roi

The interiors were finished and furnished with exceptional elegance. They had gilt-bronze wall-lights and other ornaments, designed by Ledoux in an advanced neoclassical taste and executed by Pierre Gouthière and straight-legged chairs by the prominent menuisier Louis Delanois, in the neoclassical style we know as "Louis Seize". There are some surviving chairs of the suite, which was already in production in 1769 and must at first have been intended for the château, though they were used in the pavilion and are seen in Moreau le Jeune's drawing (illustration, left).

The original state of the interiors is known by way of a drawing by Jean-Michel Moreau representing the dinner offered to Louis XV by Mme du Barry for the inauguration of the house, which can be compared with an engraving by Ledoux.

The pilasters were of gray scagliola with gilt-bronze capitals supplied by Gouthière. The girandole lights suspended in front of the mirrors between the pilasters were semi-circular, so that with their reflection in the mirrors they appeared to be circular chandeliers hanging in space, a useful trompe-l'œil to enlarge the somewhat cramped space, which was essentially an enlarged vestibule between the entrance and the Salon du Roi.

Mme du Barry commissioned from Jean-Honoré Fragonard a suite of four large paintings for Louveciennes. The painter, who attached much importance to this commission, represented The Progress of Love. However, his masterpieces displeased the commissioner, the reason for the displeasure is still argued by art historians. A 19th century reading claimed that the "lovers" in the series bore too close a resemblance to du Barry and the King. A later theory was that the paintings were in the Rococo style and du Barry's pavilion was decidedly Neo Classical, thus clashing terribly. After du Barry refused the paintings, Fragonard stored them at his studio in the Louvre. In 1790 Fragonard, his wife and son found themselves living with a cousin, Alexandre Maubert, in Grasse. As part of their room and board, Fragonard sold his cousin the four panels and painted two more large panels (Reverie and The Triumph of Love), four over-door images of cupids and two long hollyhock panels. The works stayed in the family until the mid-1880s when they were sold to the industrialist J. P. Morgan. Since 1915, they have been one of the gems of the Frick Collection in New York.

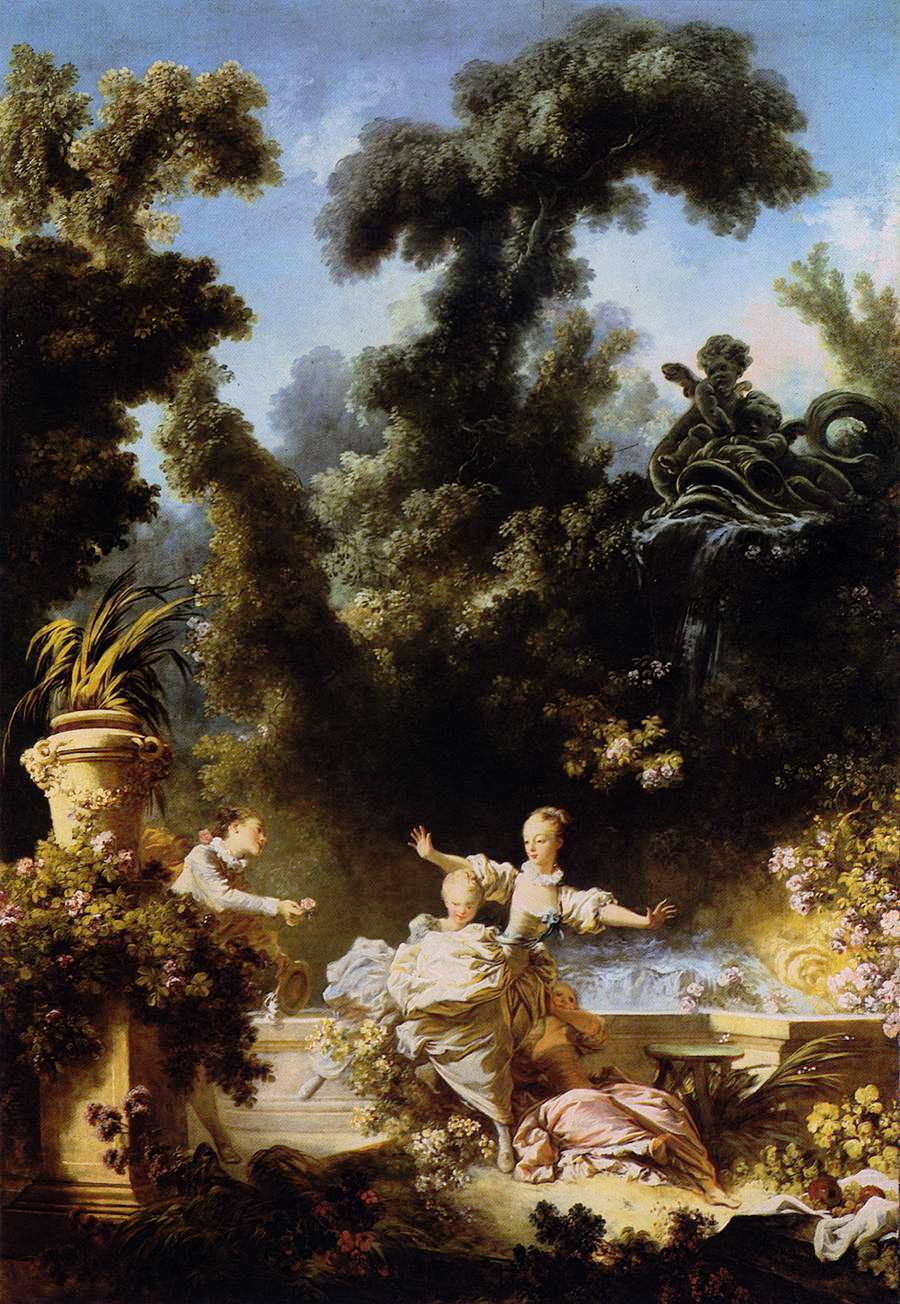
One of Fragonard's rejected canvases "The Pursuit"

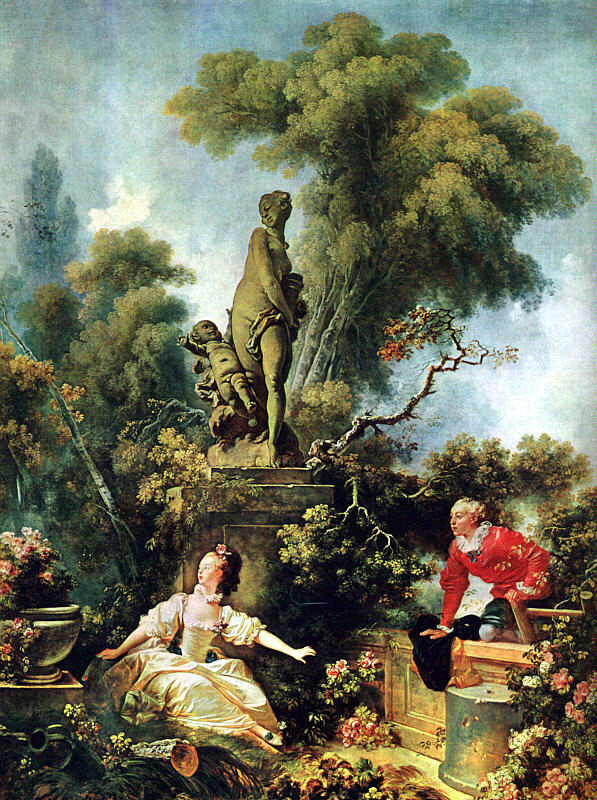
One of Fragonard's rejected canvases "The Meeting"

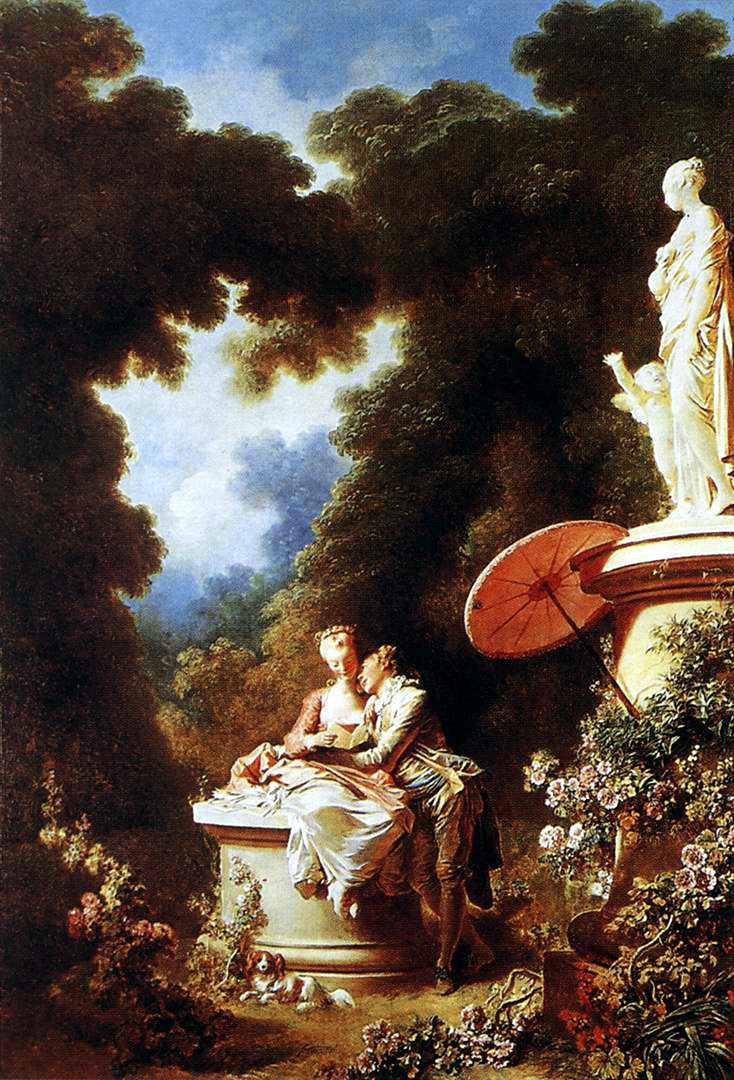
One of Fragonard's rejected canvases "Confession of Love"

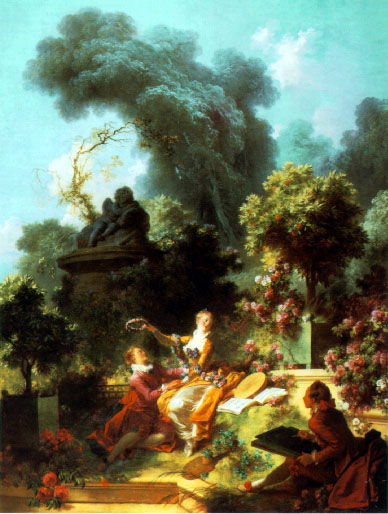
One of Fragonard's rejected canvases "The Lover Crowned"

Mme du Barry commissioned from Joseph-Marie Vien replacement paintings on the same subject, now on exhibit at the Musée du Louvre and the Château de Chambéry. Vien's neoclassical manner was gaining in popularity at the time and appeared particularly appropriate for the decor she had created in Louveciennes.

== The Park ==
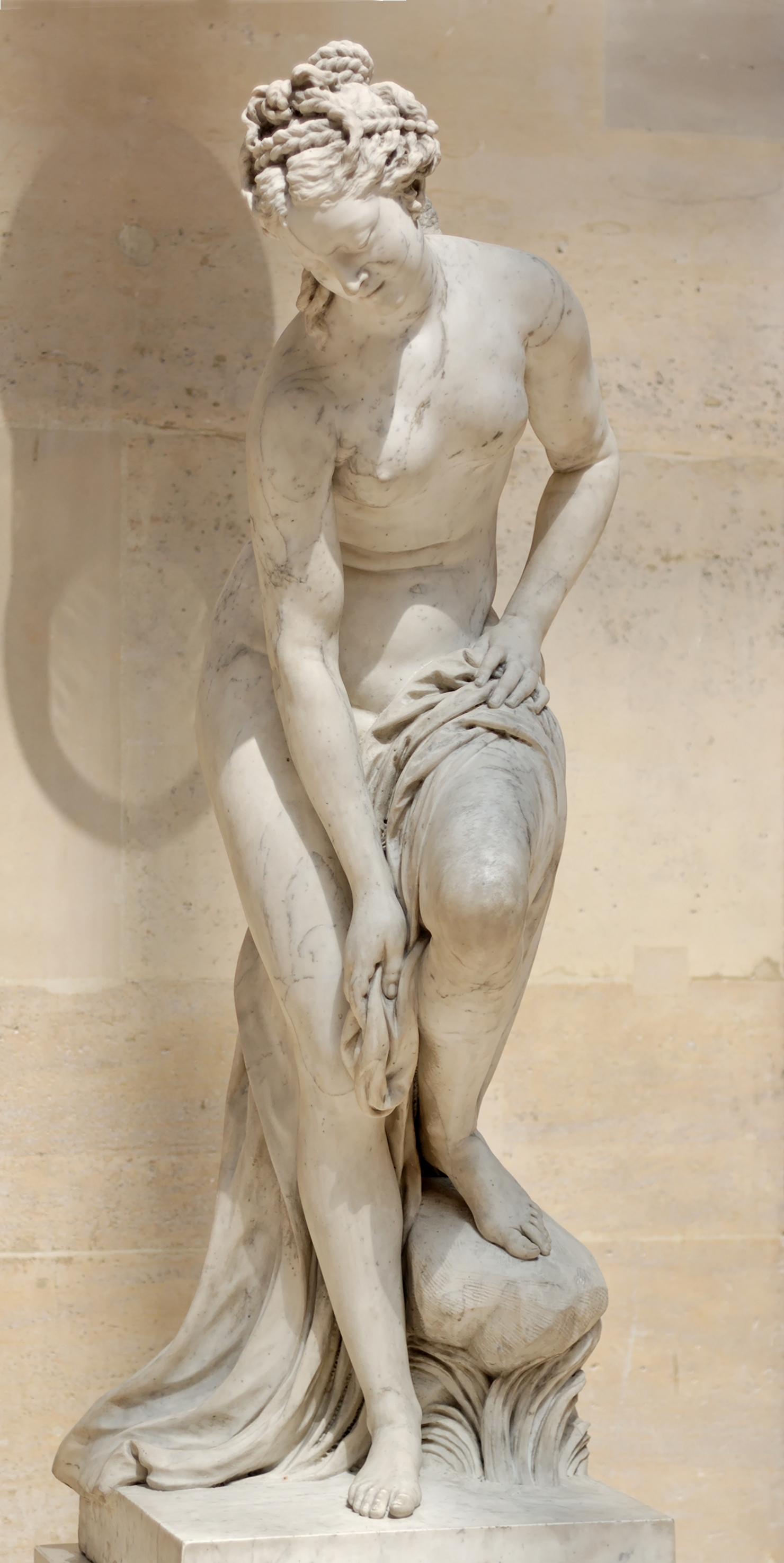
La Baigneuse by Christophe-Gabriel Allegrain stood in the park (Musée du Louvre)

In 1772, to decorate the park, Louis XV gave Mme du Barry the Bather, which Christophe-Gabriel Allegrain had exhibited in the Salon of 1767 (illustration, right). In 1776 Mme du Barry commissioned from Allegrain a pendant bather, completed in 1778; as Vénus and Diane they offered an allegory of sensuous and of chaste love. Both are now conserved in the Musée de Louvre.

In 1852, the property was expanded to the banks of the Seine, but was divided into two lots. The first, including the château, was acquired by the banker Solomon Goldschmidt, whose heirs had it built upon by the architect Henri Goury, in 1898. The entry was in the Louis XV style, flanked by two houses, located at n° 6 Chemin de la Machine. The same architect also built the stables.

The second lot included the pavilion by Ledoux, equipped with two entries built by the architect Pasquier (one, located n° 28 Route de la Princesse and the other in Quay Rennequin-Sualem in Bougival); it was acquired by a rich American from Baltimore, Alice Thal de Lancey, mistress of the banker Nissim de Camondo, who had met her through Arthur Meyer. Edmond de Goncourt made fun of "the ironic interior of Louveciennes, where Mme du Barry lived and where lives today Mme de Lancey and where the banker Camondo replaces Louis XV."

The park contains two small temples:

- One, of the Ionic order, dates undoubtedly from the 18th century and is sometimes attributed without proof to Ledoux or to Richard Mique;
- The other, of the Doric order, was built by the architect Henri Goury at the end of the 19th century.

=== See also ===
Paintings by Joseph-Marie Vien for the Château de Mme du Barry (at the official site of the Musée du Louvre):

- (in French) Amant couronnant sa maîtresse, 1773, 3,35 m x 2,02 m.
- (in French) Jeunes Grecques parant de fleurs l'Amour endormi, 1773, 3,35 m x 1,94 m.
