= Portrait of Denis Diderot =

1767 painting by Louis-Michel van Loo

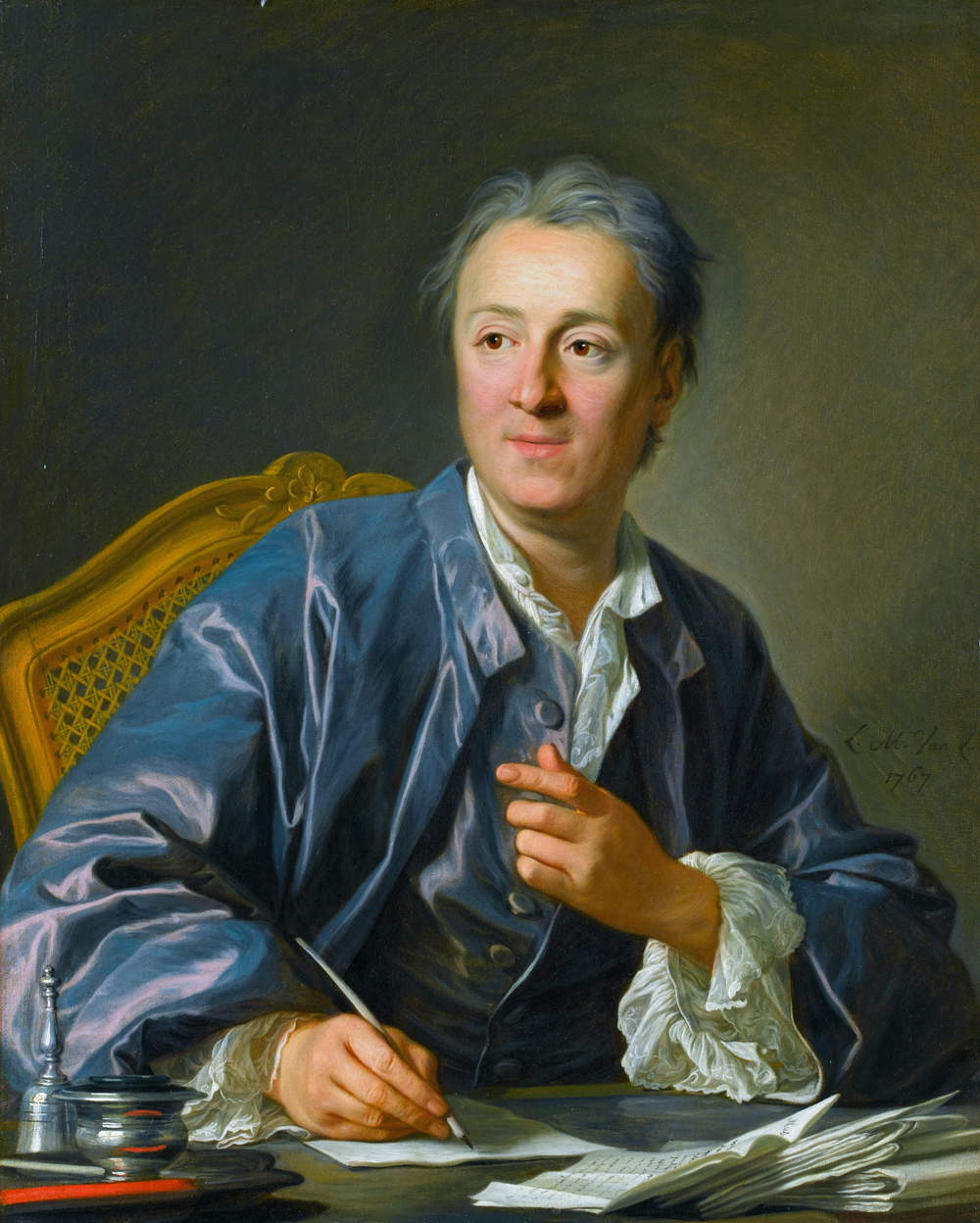
- Artist: Louis-Michel van Loo
- Year: 1767
- Type: Oil on canvas, portrait painting
- Dimensions: 81 cm × 65 cm (32 in × 26 in)
- Location: Louvre; Paris

Portrait of Denis Diderot is a 1767 portrait painting by the French artist Louis-Michel van Loo. Rococo in style, it depicts the philosopher, writer and art critic Denis Diderot, a significant figure in the Age of Enlightenment in Ancien régime France. It was common in the eighteenth century for writers to be portrayed in dressing gowns to indicate their literary interests.

Diderot himself strongly disliked the painting. He said he had been made to look like an old cocotte who was still trying to be agreeable." It was exhibited at the Salon of 1767 at the Louvre in Paris, which Diderot wrote about extensively. Today it is in the collection of the Louvre, having been acquired in 1911.

== Bibliography ==
- Koda, Harold Bolton, Andrew. Dangerous Liaisons: Fashion and Furniture in the Eighteenth Century. Metropolitan Museum of Art, 2006.
- Milam, Jennifer D. Historical Dictionary of Rococo Art. Scarecrow Press, 2011.
- Milano, Ronit. The Portrait Bust and French Cultural Politics in the Eighteenth Century. BRILL, 2015.
- Peretz, Eyal. Dramatic Experiments: Life according to Diderot. State University of New York Press, 2013.
- Poulet, Anne L. Jean-Antoine Houdon: Sculptor of the Enlightenment. University of Chicago Press, 2003.
