= Salon of 1767 =

1767 art exhibition in Paris

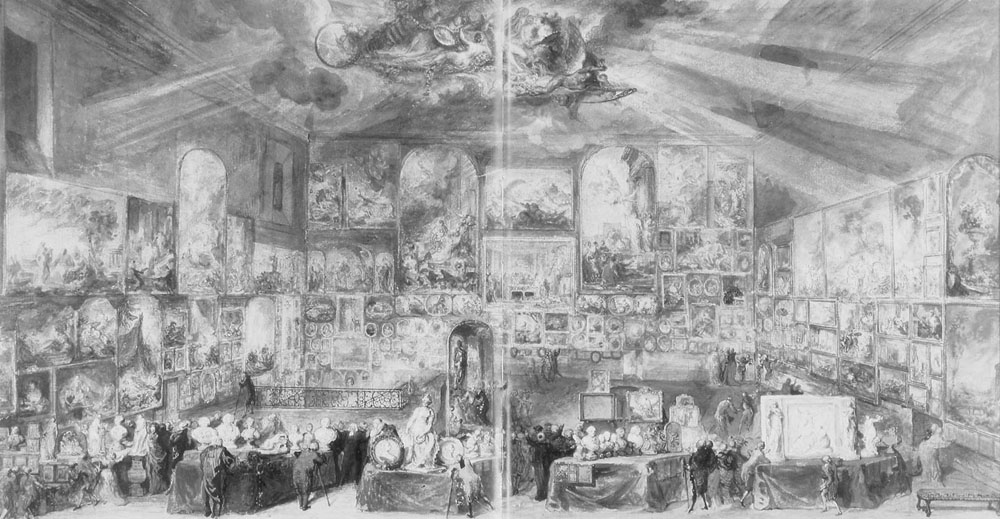
Interior of the Salon of 1767 by Gabriel de Saint-Aubin

The Salon of 1767 was an art exhibition held at the Louvre in Paris. It took place during the reign of Louis XV and was overseen by the Académie Royale. It was preceded by the Salon of 1765 and followed by the Salon of 1769.

The Alsatian artist Philip James de Loutherbourg, widely praised at the previous two Salons, returned with Landscape with Animals. The critic Denis Diderot considered the artist's work to represent "beautiful nature". Hubert Robert, a painter of landscapes and capriccios, made his Salon debut in 1767. He exhibited A View of Ripetta, a veduta of Rome. Jean Siméon Chardin submitted a lair of still life paintings The Attributes of Civilian and Military Music. In portraiture Louis-Michel van Loo exhibited a Portrait of Denis Diderot, the influential art critic who wrote extensively about the Salon, as well as another featuring the wife of Joseph Vernet. Alexander Roslin displayed his Portrait of Jean-François Marmontel. The sculptor Christophe-Gabriel Allegrain submitted his Venus at the Bath. It was the final Salon at which Jean-Honoré Fragonard exhibited work despite his career continuing for several decades.

== Gallery ==
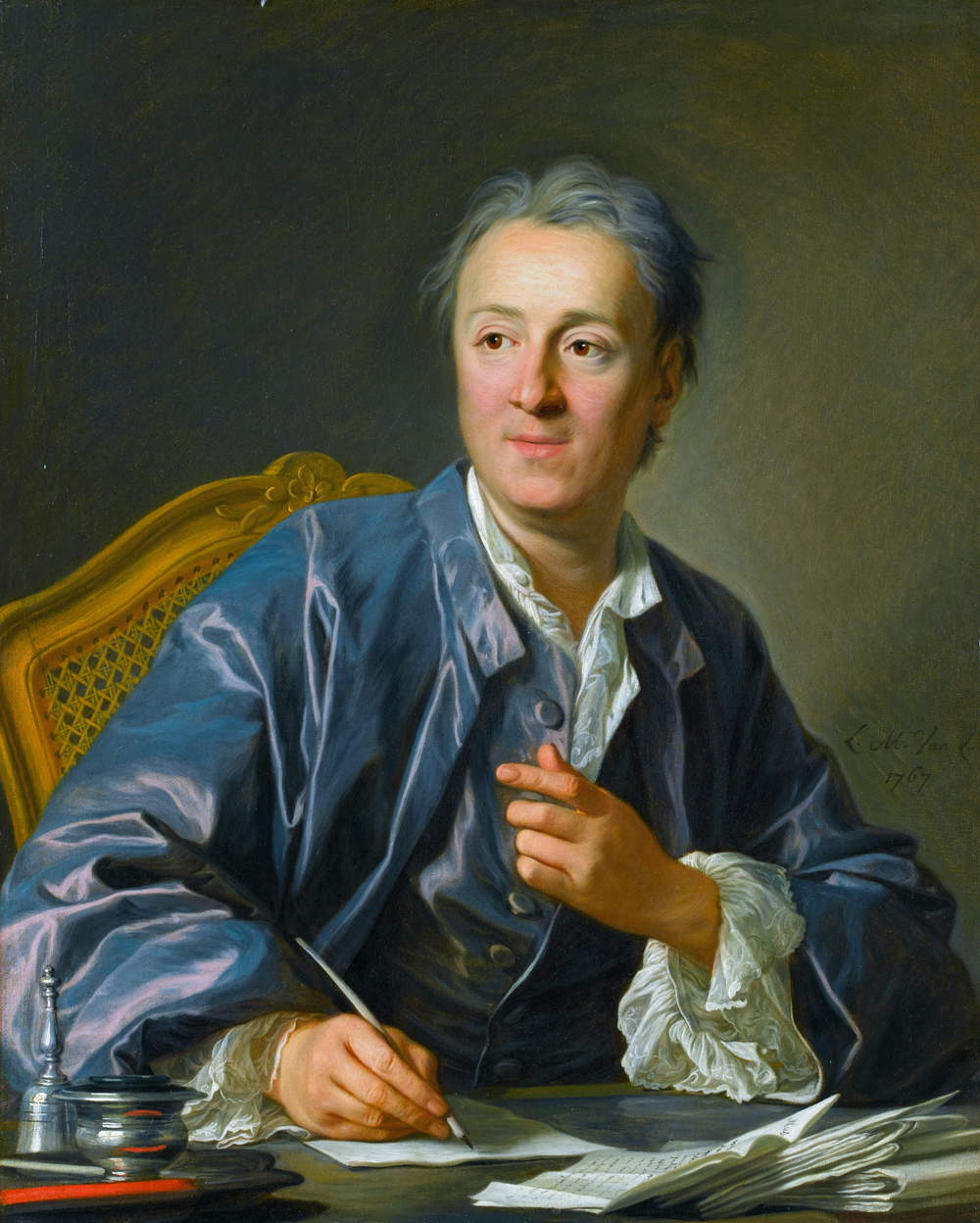
Portrait of Denis Diderot by Louis-Michel van Loo

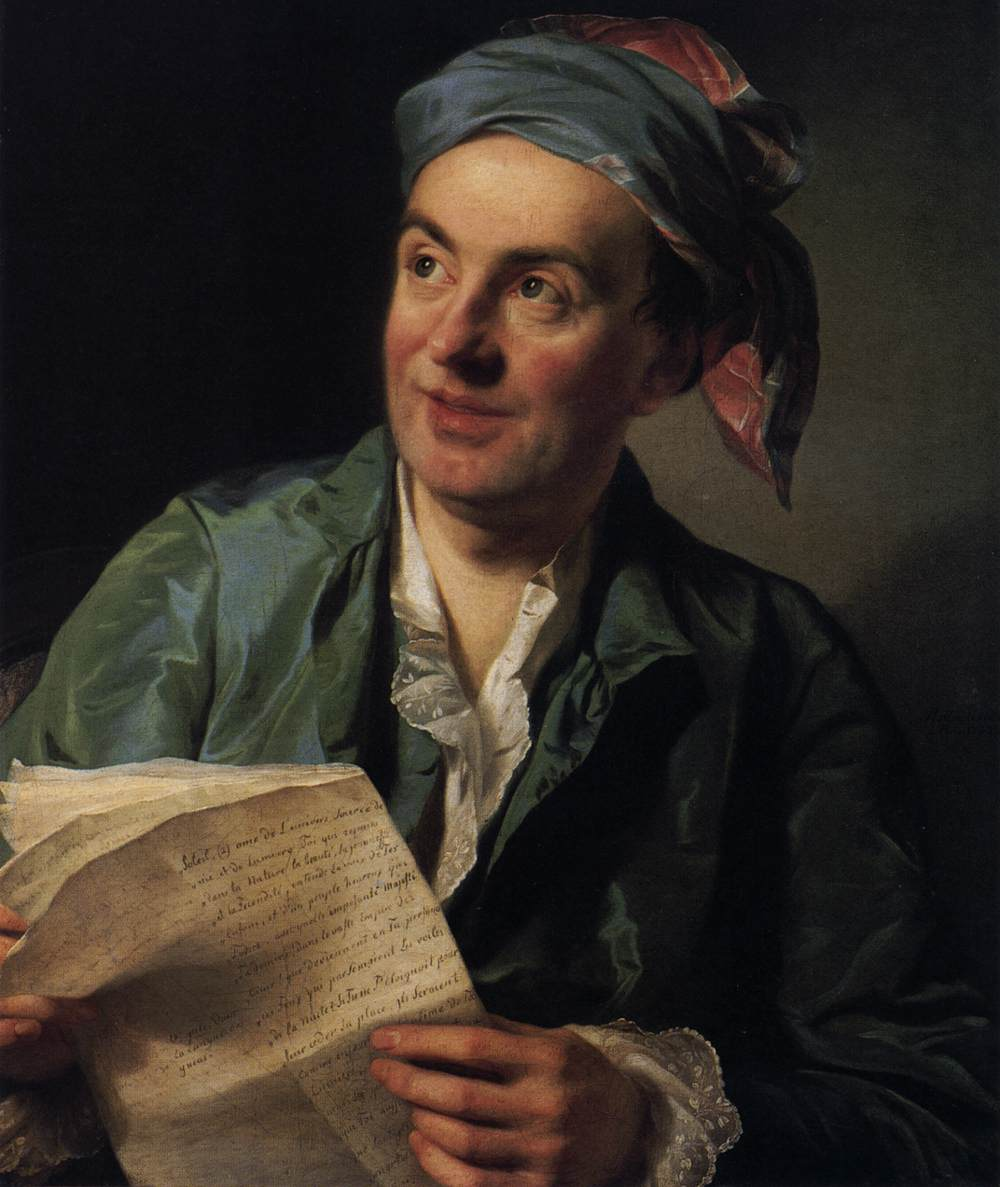
Portrait of Jean-François Marmontel by Alexander Roslin

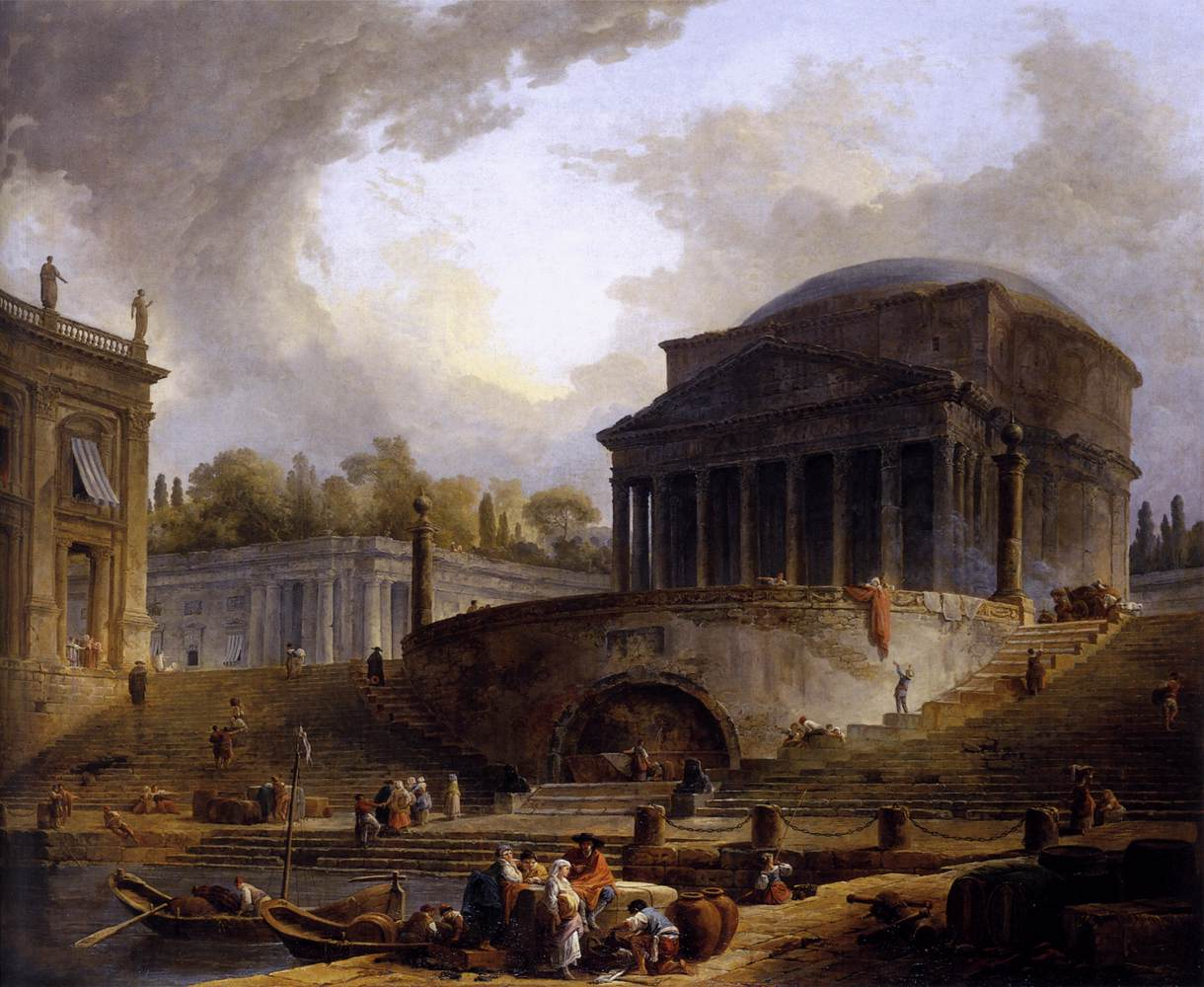
A View of Ripetta by Hubert Robert

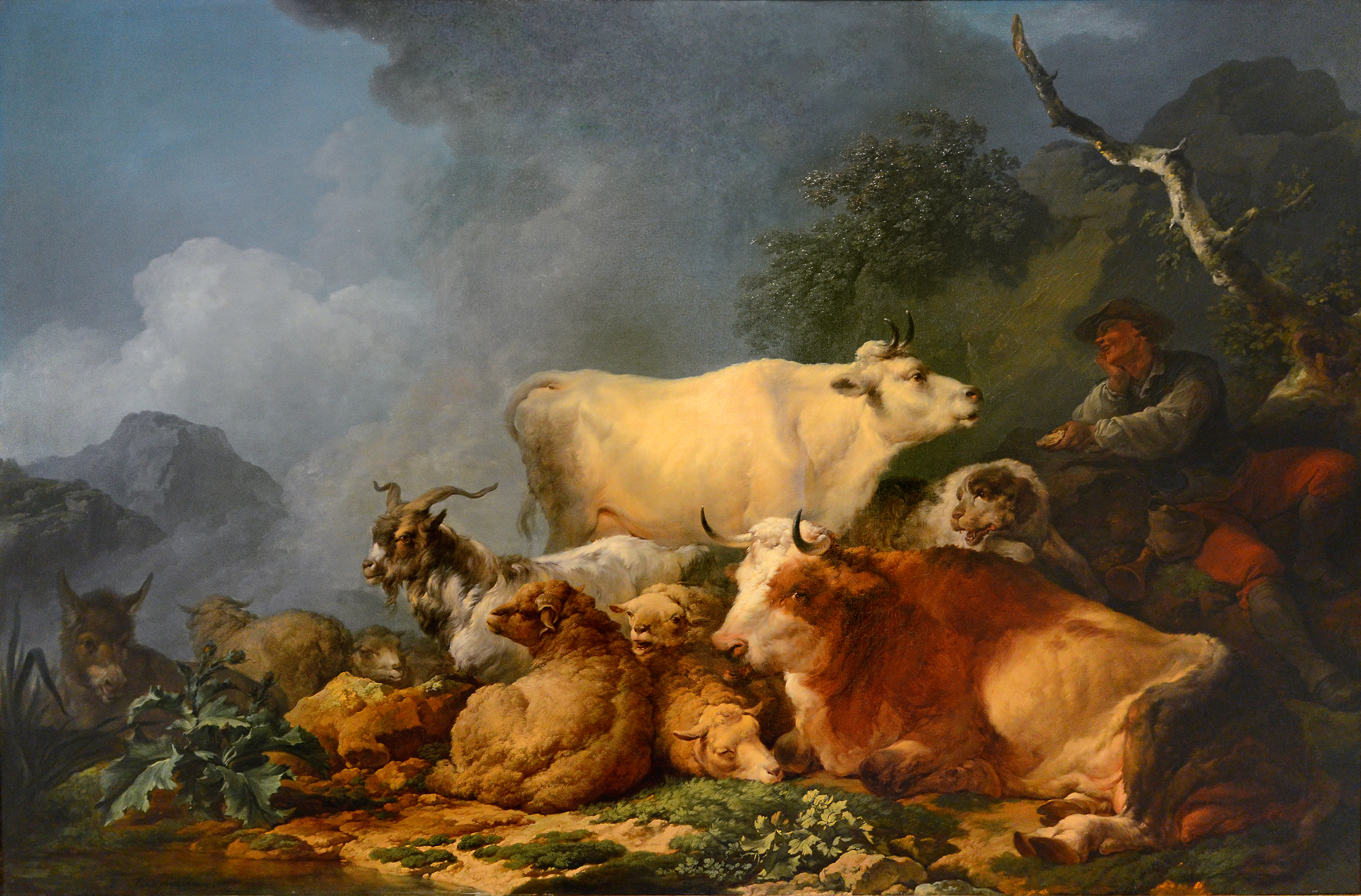
Landscape with Animals by Philip James de Loutherbourg

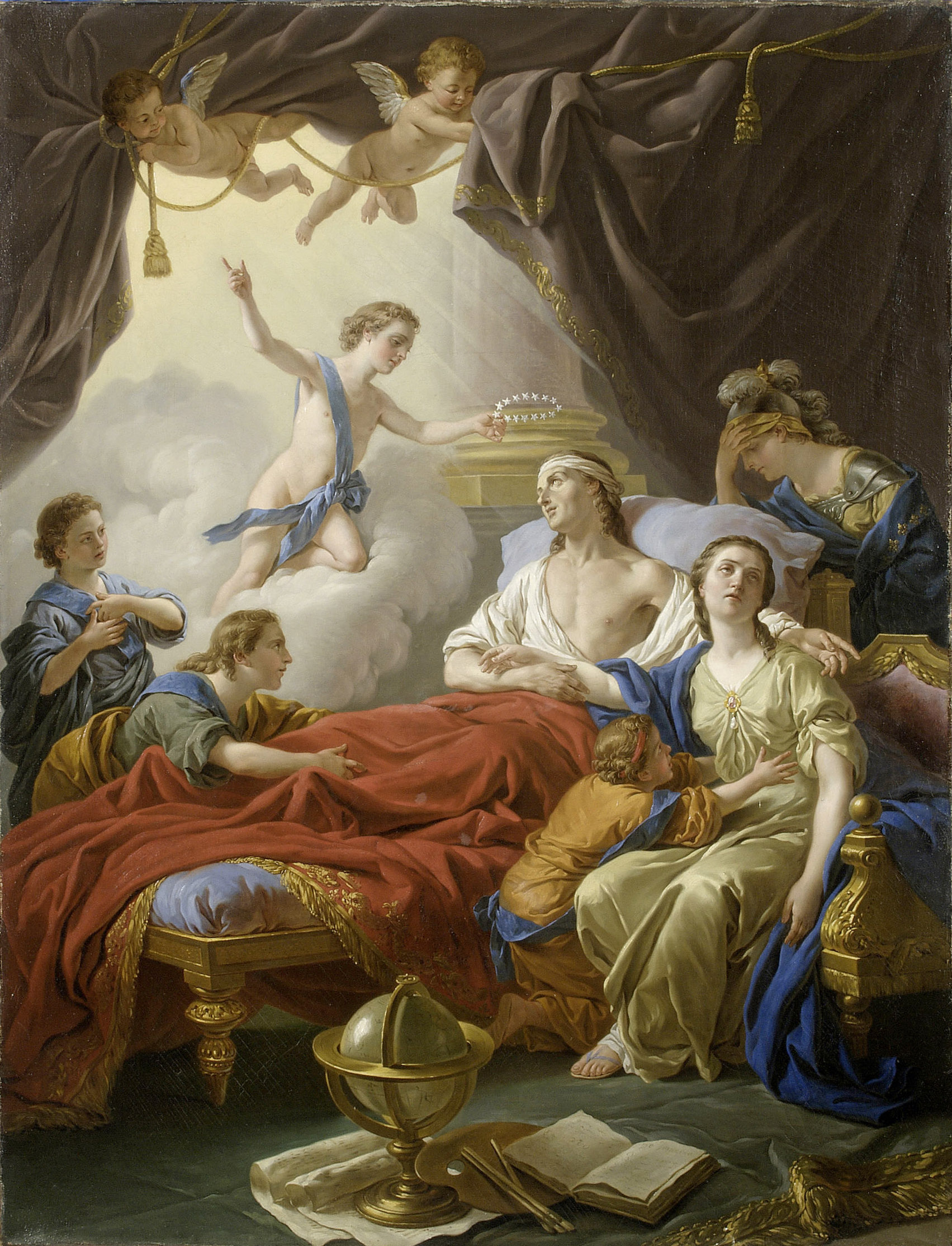
Allegory on the Death of the Dauphin by Louis-Jean-François Lagrenée

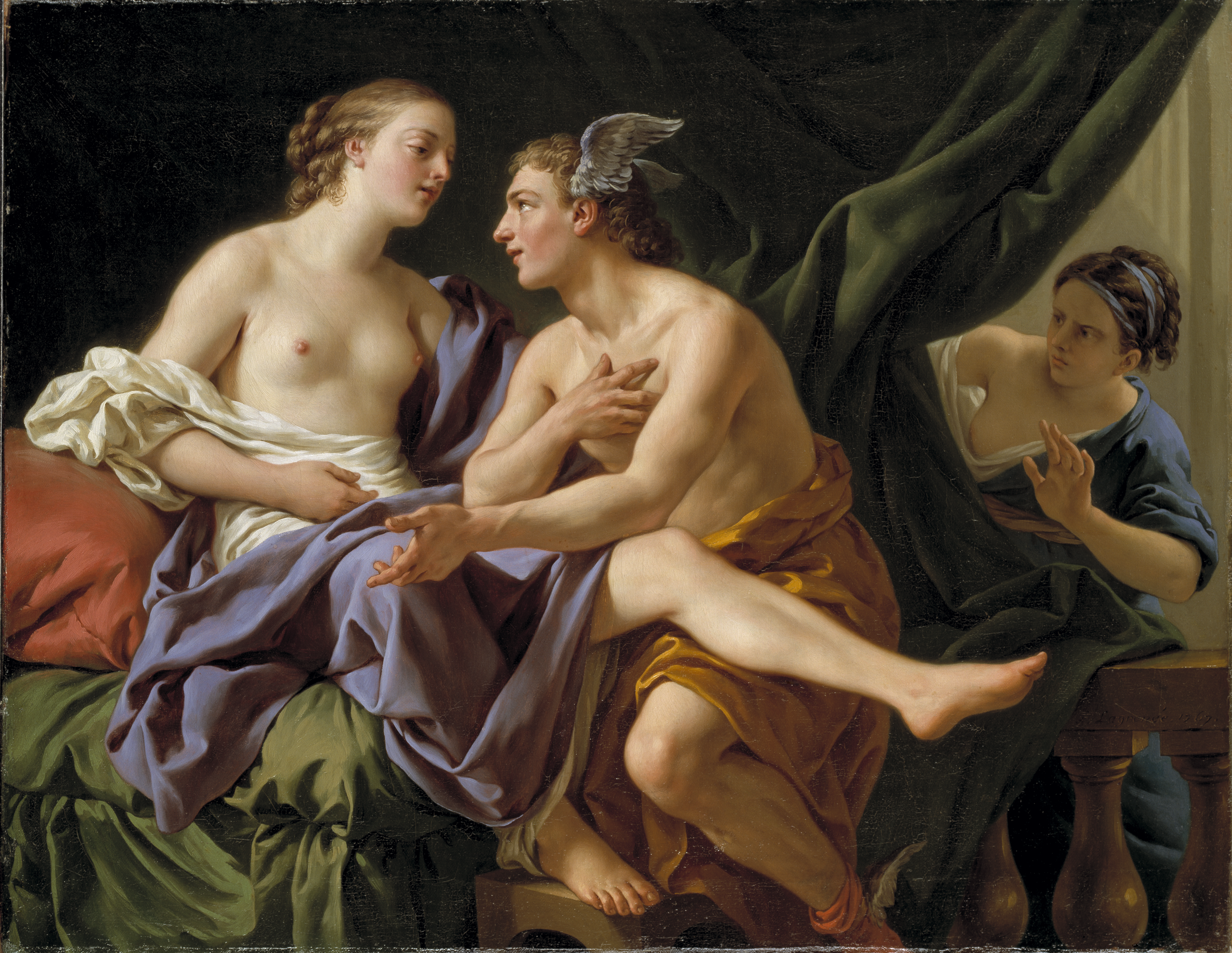
Mercury, Herse and Aglaura by Louis-Jean-François Lagrenée

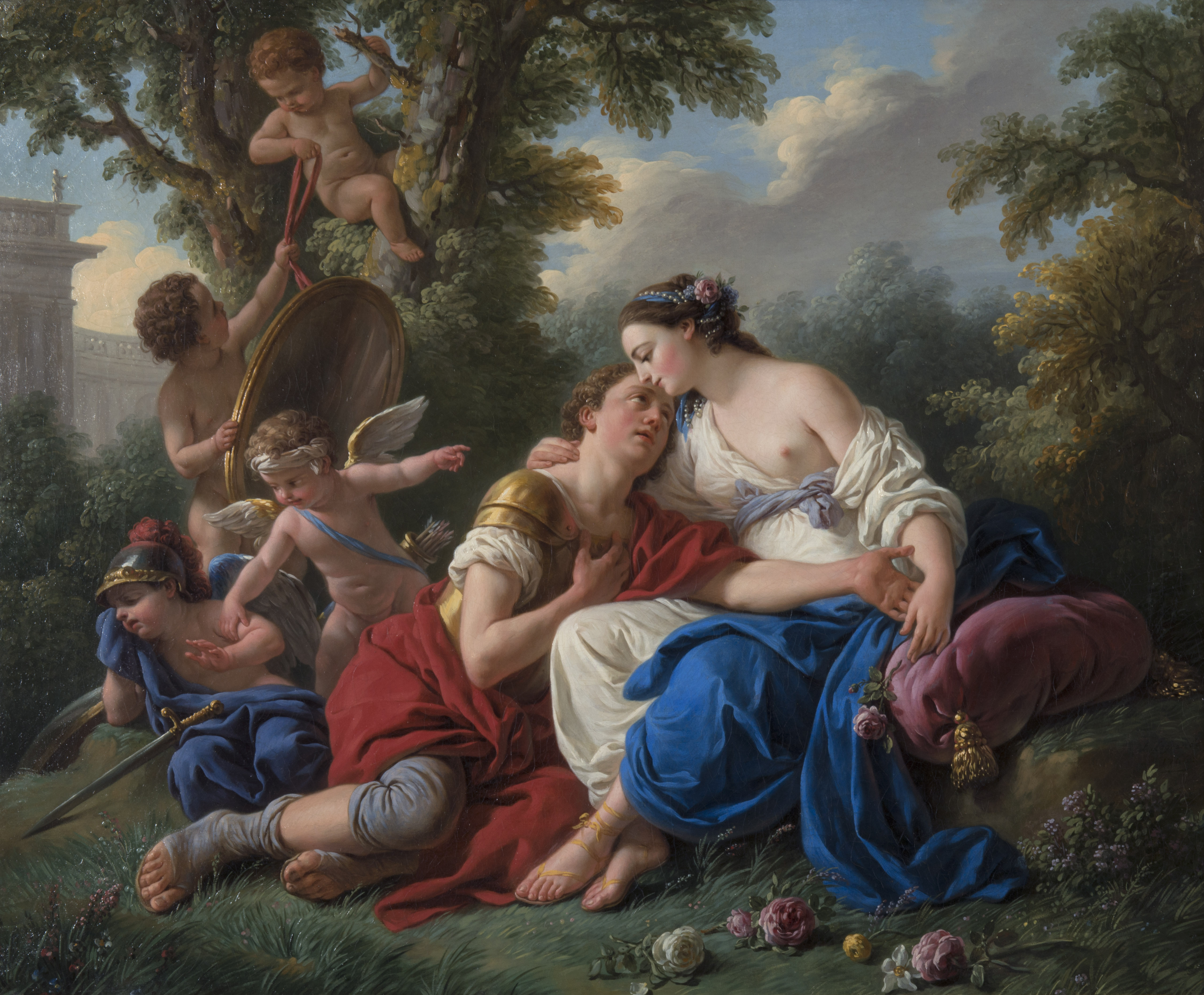
Rinaldo and Armida by Louis-Jean-François Lagrenée

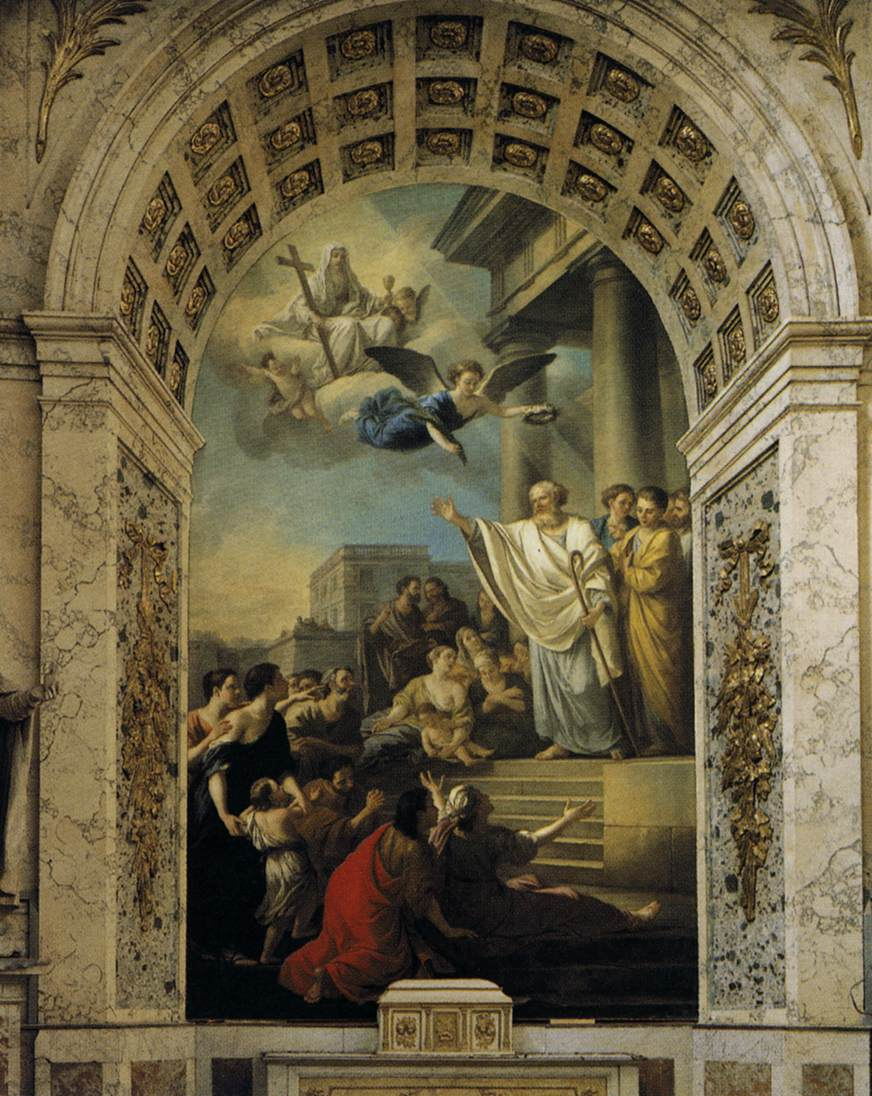
Saint Denis Preaching in Gaul by Joseph-Marie Vien

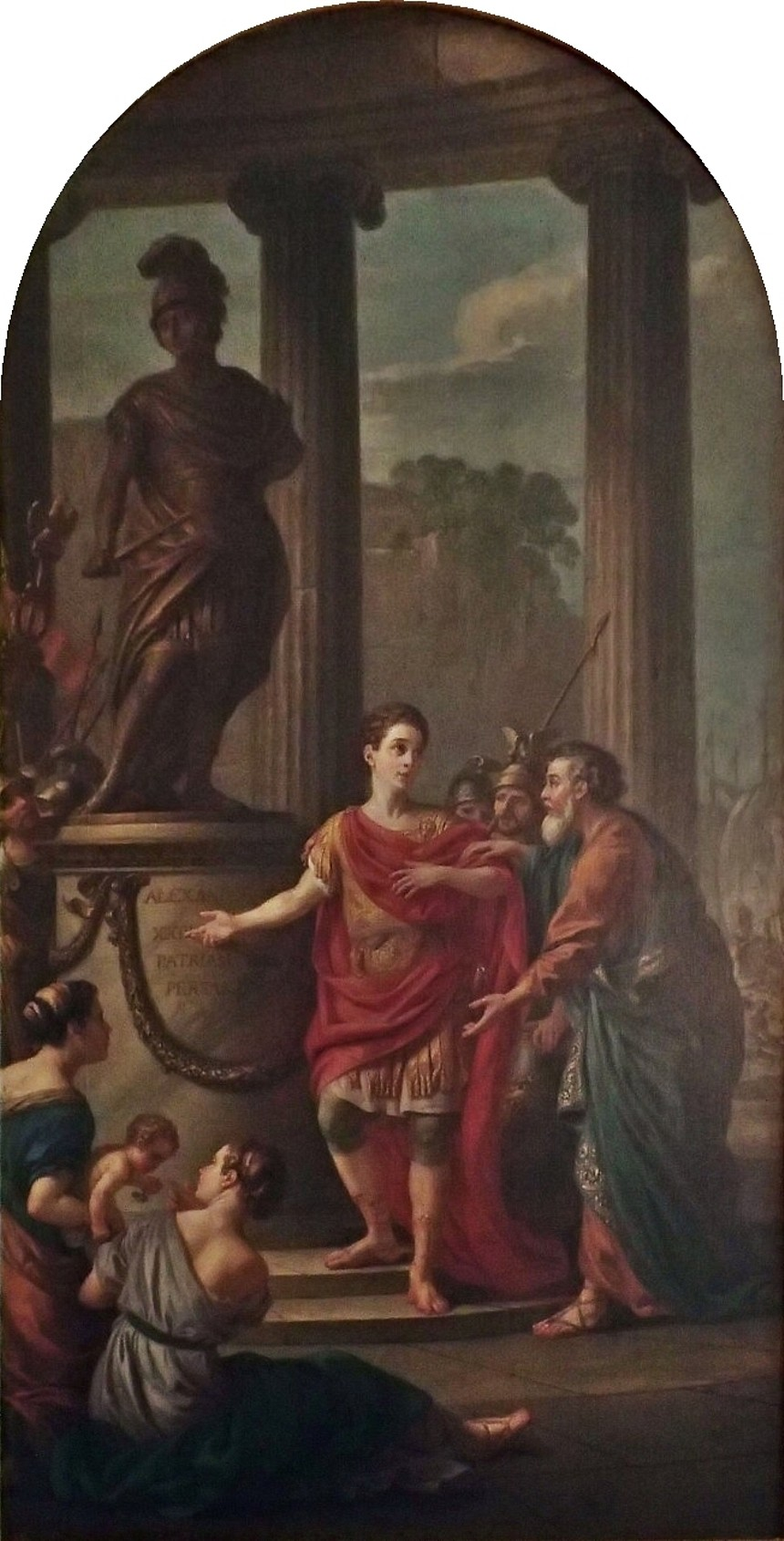
Caesar Facing a Statue of Alexander by Joseph-Marie Vien

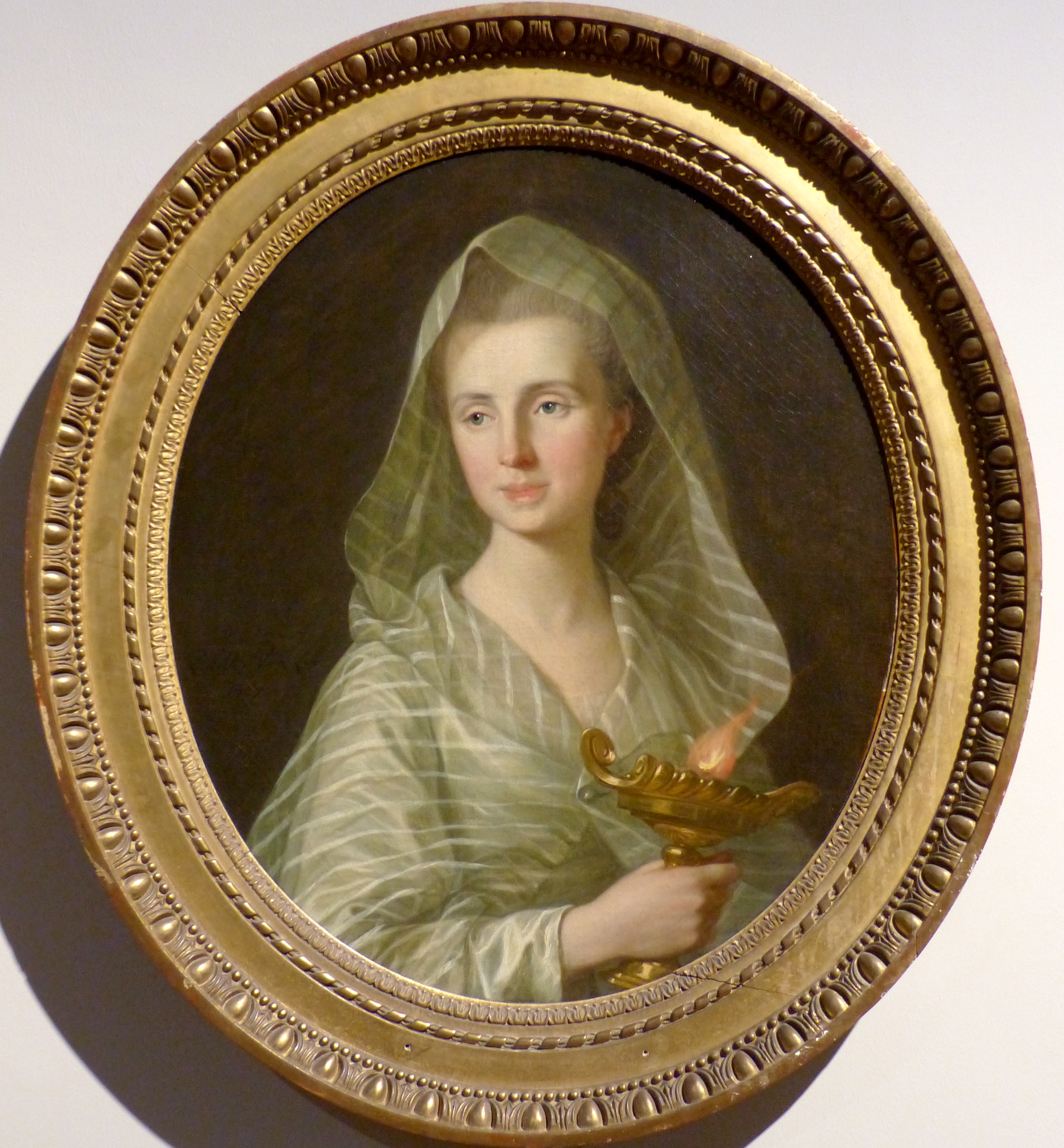
Portrait of Madame Vernet by Louis-Michel van Loo

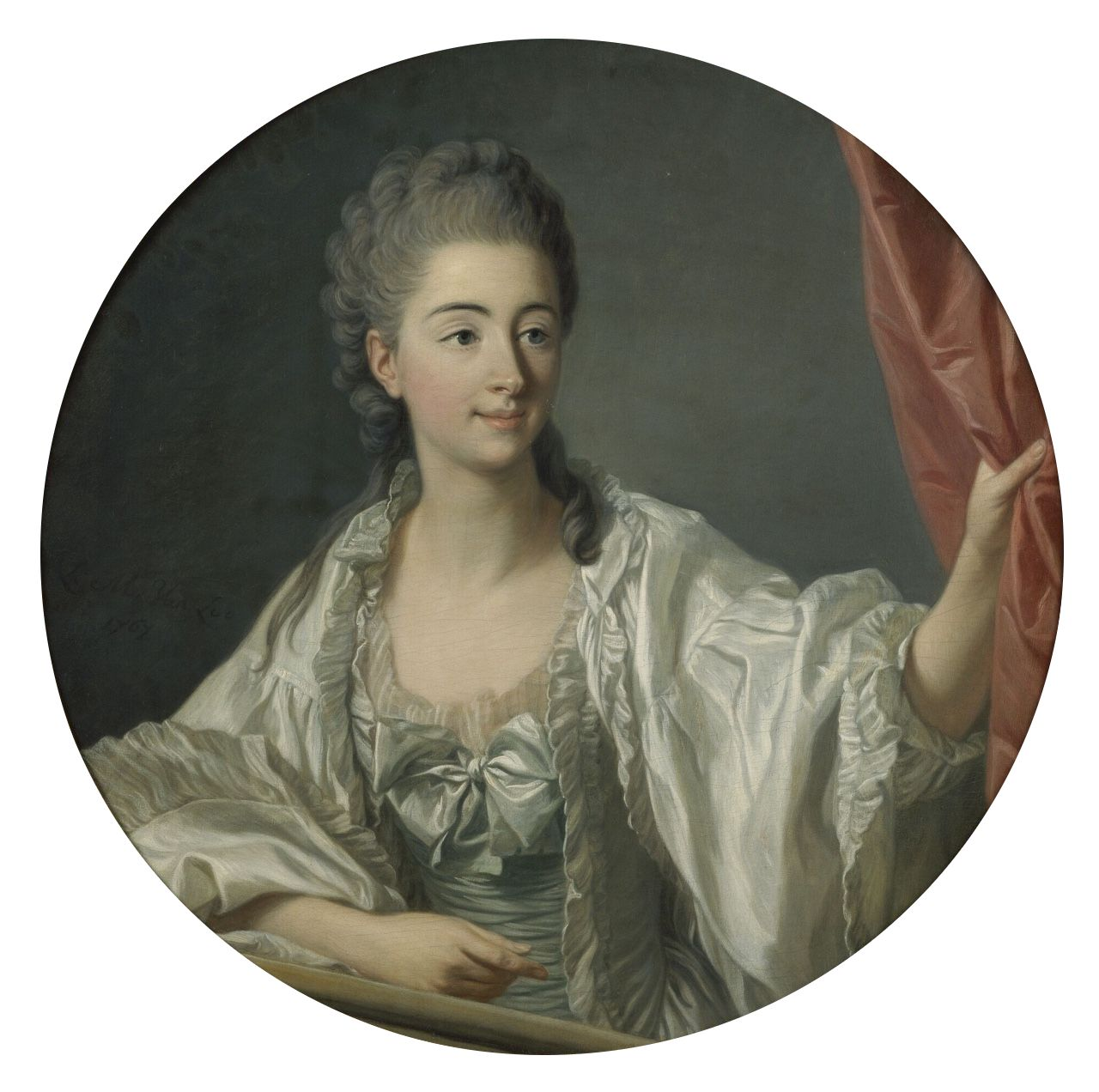
Portrait of the Princess of Chimay by Louis-Michel van Loo

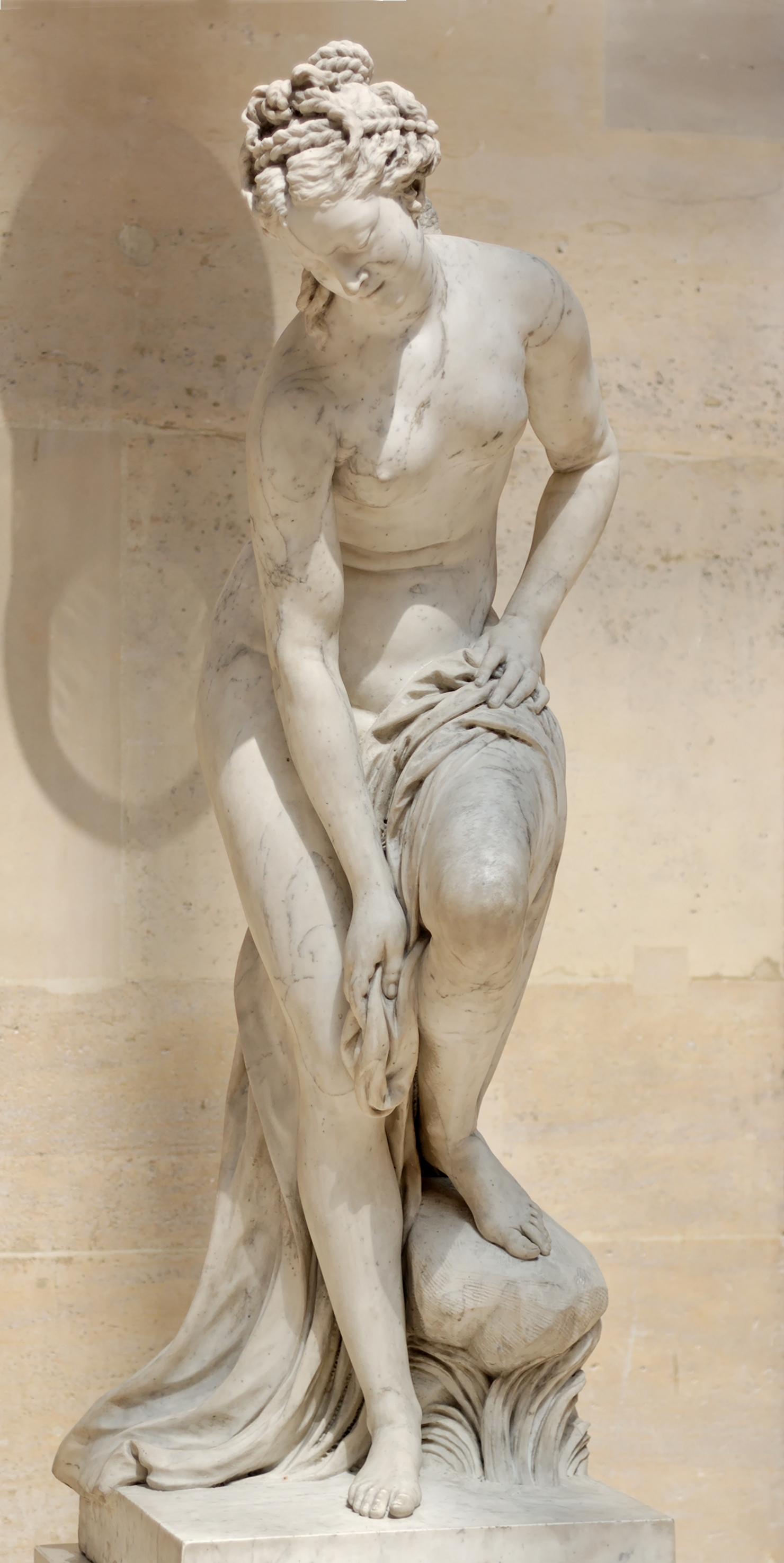
Venus at the Bath by Christophe-Gabriel Allegrain

== Bibliography ==
- Delon, Michel (ed.) Encyclopedia of the Enlightenment. Routledge, 2013.
- Levey, Michael. Painting and Sculpture in France, 1700-1789. Yale University Press, 1993.
- Woodward, Christopher. In Ruins. Random House, 2010.
