= Landscape with Animals =

Painting by Philip James de Loutherbourg

- French: Paysage avec animaux
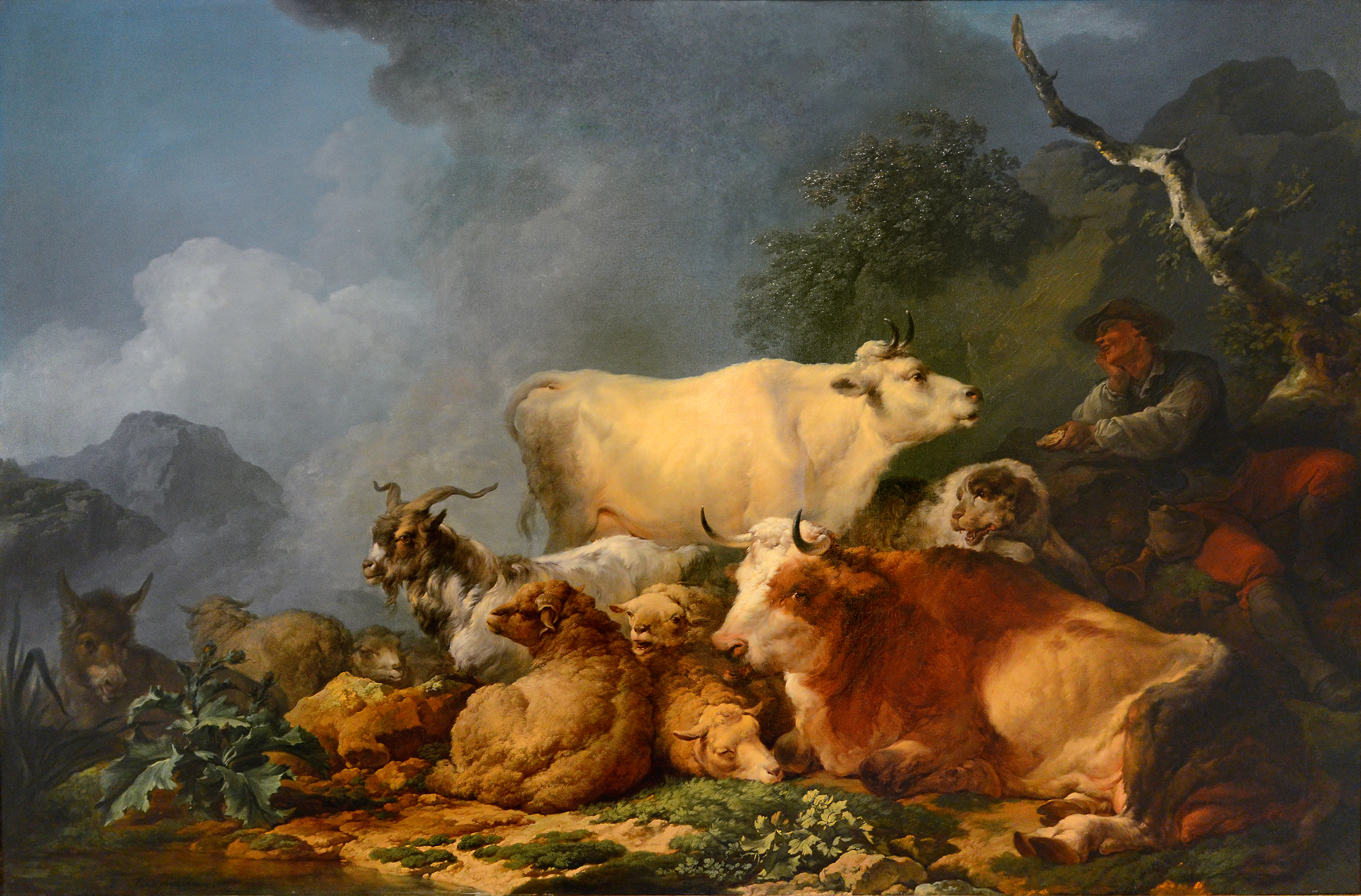
- Artist: Philip James de Loutherbourg
- Year: 1767
- Medium: oil painting on canvas
- Movement: Rococo; Animal painting Landscape painting
- Subject: cattle, sheep, goats, and a donkey, with a herder and his dog
- Dimensions: 130 cm × 196 cm (51 in × 77 in)
- Location: Musée des Beaux-Arts, Strasbourg
- Accession: 1926

Landscape with Animals is a 1767 painting by Philip James de Loutherbourg. It is now in the Musée des Beaux-Arts of Strasbourg, France. Its inventory number is 1062. The painting was much admired by Denis Diderot, an early patron of Loutherbourg, when it was shown at the Paris Salon of 1767. Although Diderot found the clouds unconvincing – as heavy and solid as lapis lazuli – he heaped enormous praise on the depiction of the animals, especially the white cow at the centre of the composition.
