= Eudoxe Marcille =

French painter, museum director, art school director and art collector

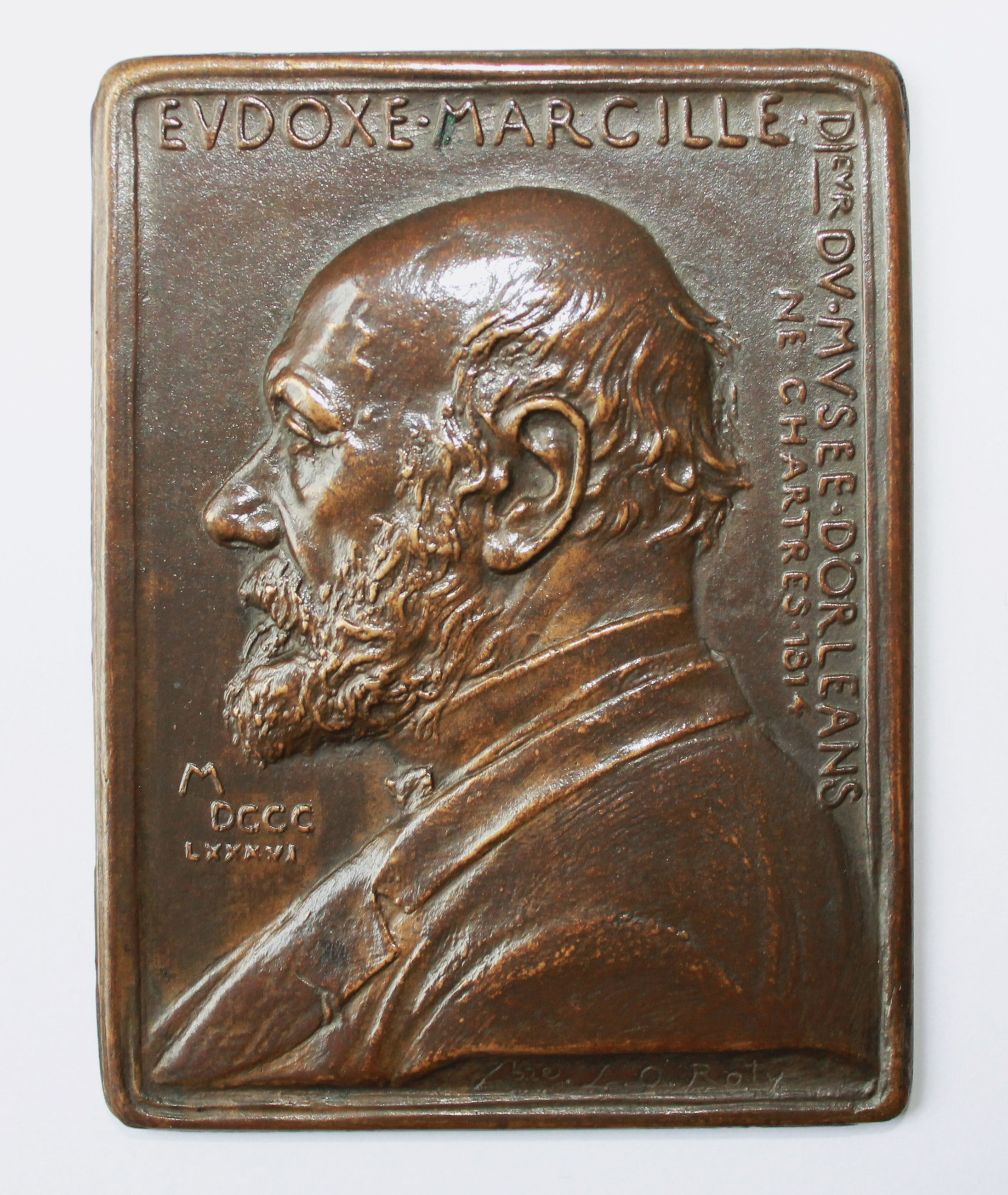
Eudoxe Marcille

Eudoxe Marcille (20 April 1814, Chartres – 7 April 1890, Chécy) was a French painter, museum director, art school director and art collector. His father François Marcille (1790–1856) and his younger brother Camille Marcille (1816–1875) were also art collectors.
