= Place des Arts =

Performing arts centre in Montreal

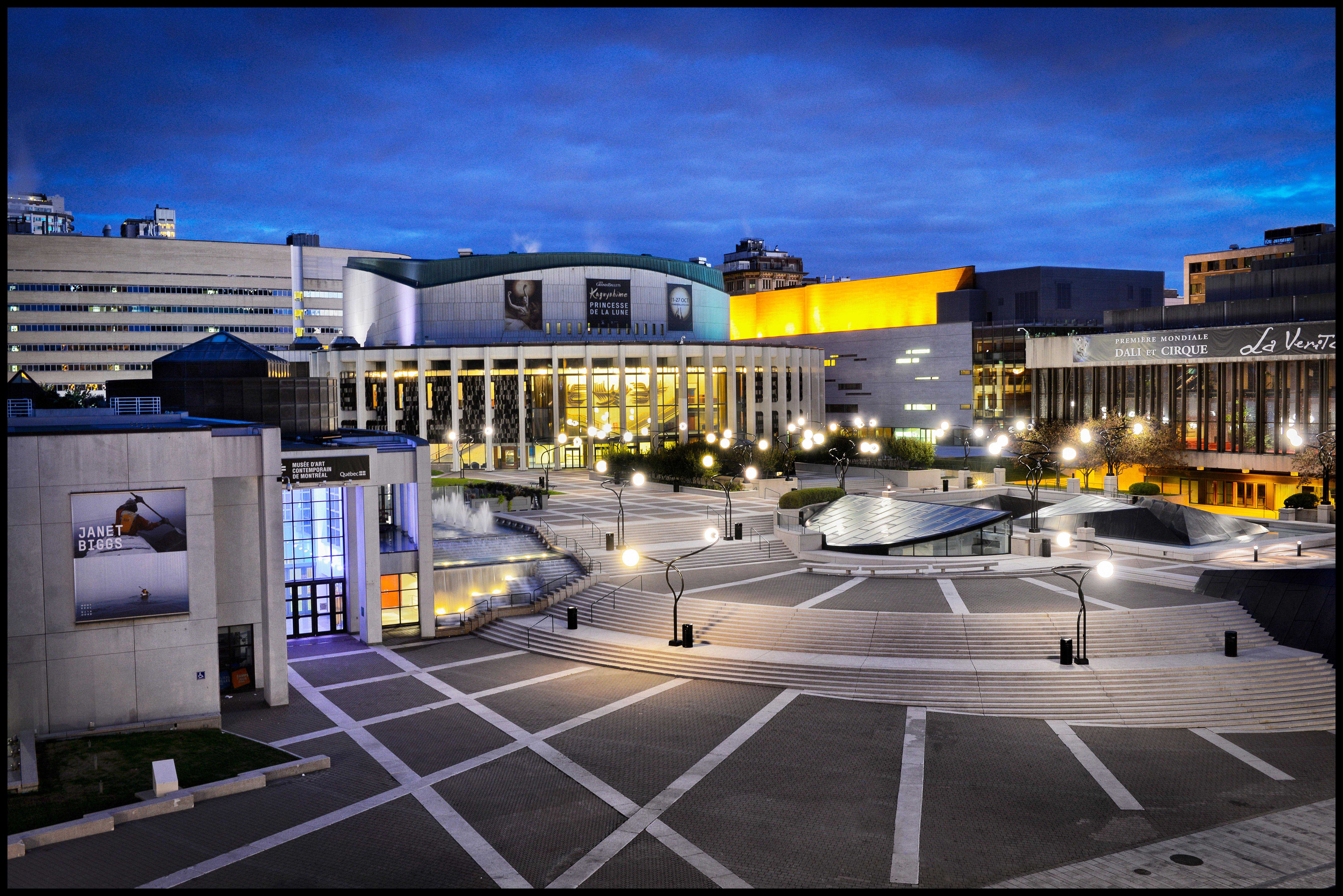
- Place des Arts de Montréal esplanade
- Interactive map of Place des Arts
- Location: 260, boulevard de Maisonneuve Ouest; Montreal, Quebec; H2X 1Y9
- Coordinates: 45°30′29″N 73°34′01″W
- Created: 1963
- Status: Open all year
- Public transit: at Place-des-Arts station Place-des-Arts Terminus

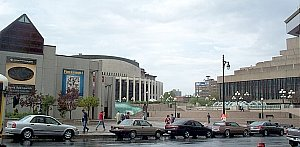
View of the Place des Arts esplanade. The Musée d'art contemporain is on the left; behind it is the Salle Wilfrid-Pelletier, with the Théâtre Maisonneuve on the right.

Place des Arts (French pronunciation: [plas dez‿aʁ]) is a major performing arts centre. Located in Montreal's Quartier des Spectacles, Quebec, Canada, it is the largest cultural and artistic complex in Canada.

Home to the Montreal Symphony Orchestra, the Orchestre Métropolitain, Les Grands Ballets Canadiens, and the Opéra de Montréal, the complex is situated between Saint Catherine and de Maisonneuve streets, and Saint-Urbain and Jeanne-Mance streets, in an area now known as the Quartier des spectacles in the borough of Ville-Marie.

Place des Arts was an initiative of Mayor Jean Drapeau, a noted lover of opera, as part of a project to expand the downtown core eastward from the concentration of business and financial activity in the centre-west part of downtown. The Corporation George-Étienne-Cartier, named in honour of George-Étienne Cartier, a Father of Confederation and opera lover, was set up to build it, and the first part of the complex (including the Salle Wilfrid-Pelletier) was inaugurated on September 21, 1963. The other theatres were added progressively.

== Additions ==
The Musée d'art contemporain de Montréal was added to the complex on May 28, 1992, and in 2009, construction began on a new concert hall for the Montreal Symphony Orchestra. The 2,100-seat facility opened in 2011 at the cost of C$105 million.

In 2015, the Quebec government announced it would spend $34.2 million to remodel the esplanade into a large outdoor stage that will host big events year round. Work is to be complete in 2018.

In 2019, the Salon urbain opened, a public glass-walled space used for free performances.

In 2022, Place des Arts inaugurated the Espace culturel Georges-Émile-Lapalme. This is a redesigned public area aimed at enhancing accessibility and cultural outreach within the complex.

In 2023, Place des Arts launched a digital and immersive programming initiatives.

== Concert venues ==
The Place des Arts includes six concert venues of various sizes:

- Salle Wilfrid-Pelletier (Capacity of 2,996)
- Montreal Symphony House (Capacity of 2,117)
- Théâtre Maisonneuve (Capacity of 1,453)
- Théâtre Jean-Duceppe (Capacity of 765)
- Cinquième salle (Capacity of 420)
- Salle Claude-Léveillée (Capacity of 129)

This wealth of theatres permits the staging of opera, symphony, ballet and other dance, chamber music, choral music, theatre, film presentation, and various other presentations and ceremonies. In addition to the theatres, the complex hosts the Musée d'art contemporain de Montréal, a museum of contemporary art, as well as rehearsal halls, shops, services, and a large, popular esplanade decorated with original fountains and water cascades.

All the facilities are connected by an underground mall, also linked to Place-des-Arts Metro station and Université du Québec à Montréal (UQAM) to the north and the Complexe Desjardins to the south as part of the Underground City.

The site is decorated with several works of public art including L'artiste est celui qui fait voir l'autre côté des choses by Claude Bettinger, Comme si le temps… de la rue by Pierre Granche, and La Voie lactée by Geneviève Cadieux. A bust of conductor Wilfrid Pelletier by sculptor Arto Tchakmaktchian is on permanent display in the entrance hall.

In the summer, the esplanade and adjacent street comprise one of the important outdoor sites of the Festival International de Jazz de Montréal.

== Works ==
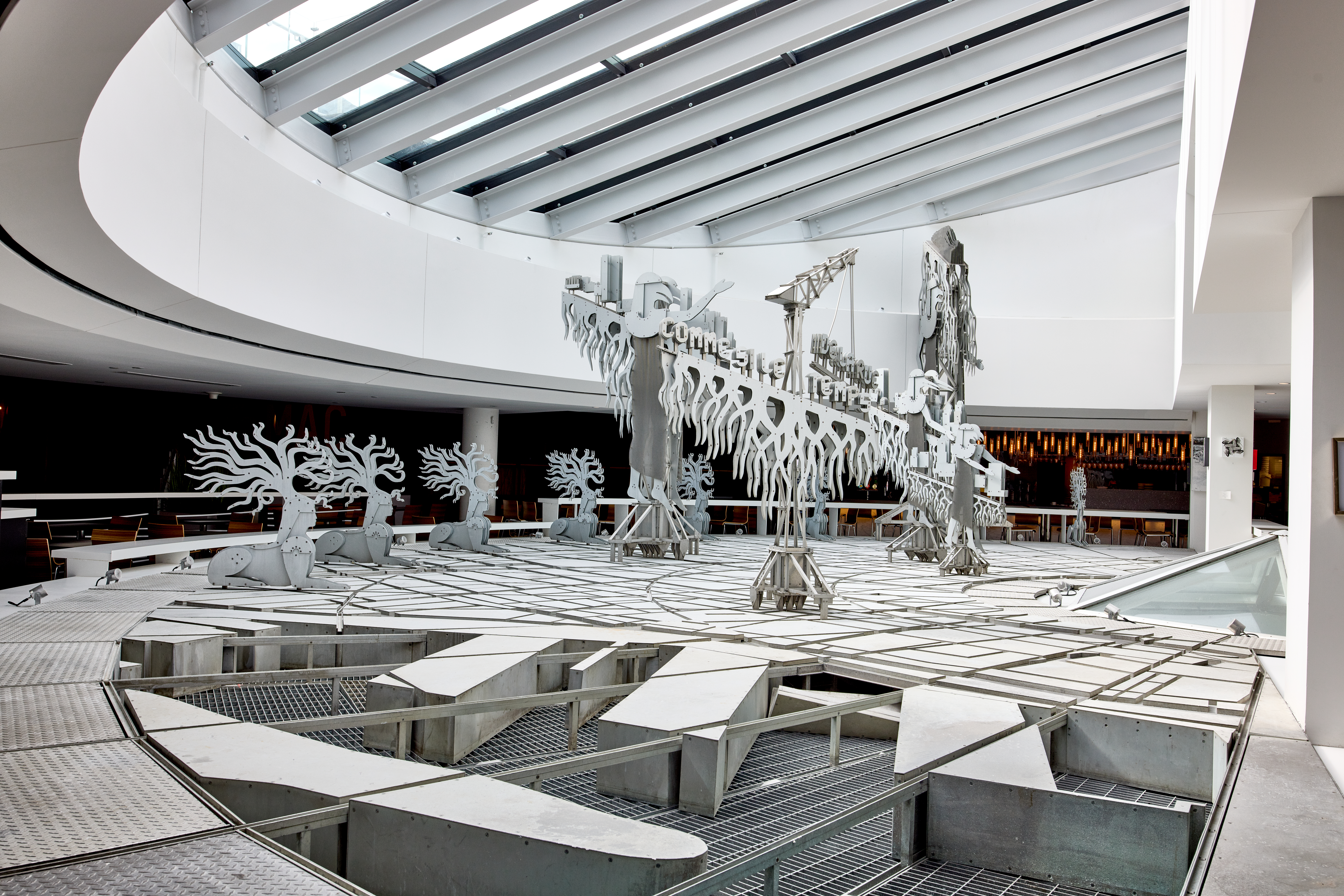
Pierre Granche's Comme si le temps... de la rue, an ensemble of symbolic aluminium free-standing sculptures in a large fountain basin visible from the exterior and interior of Place des Arts, Montreal, Quebec

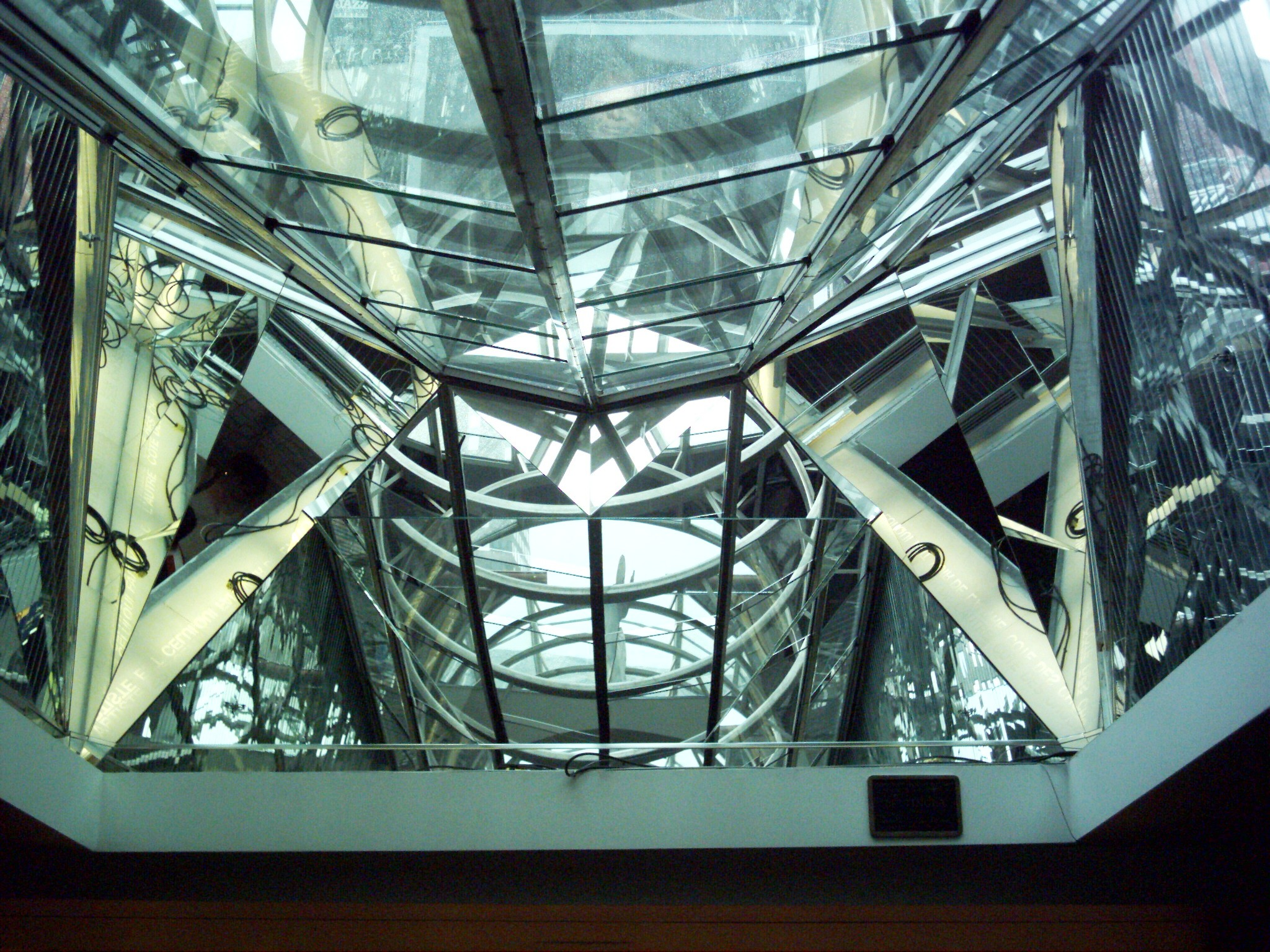
Installation by Claude Bettinger, Place des Arts, Montreal, Quebec

== Gallery ==
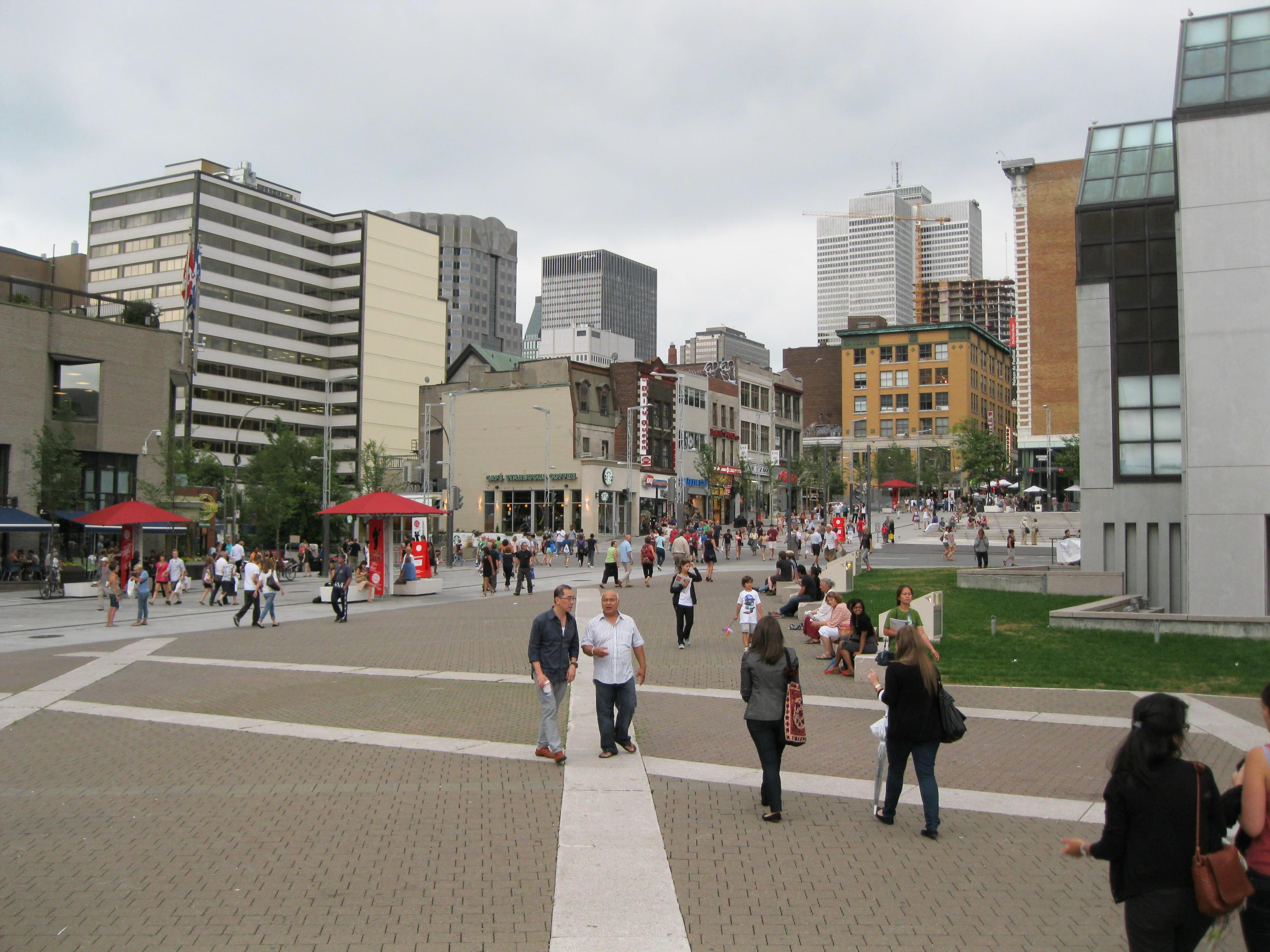

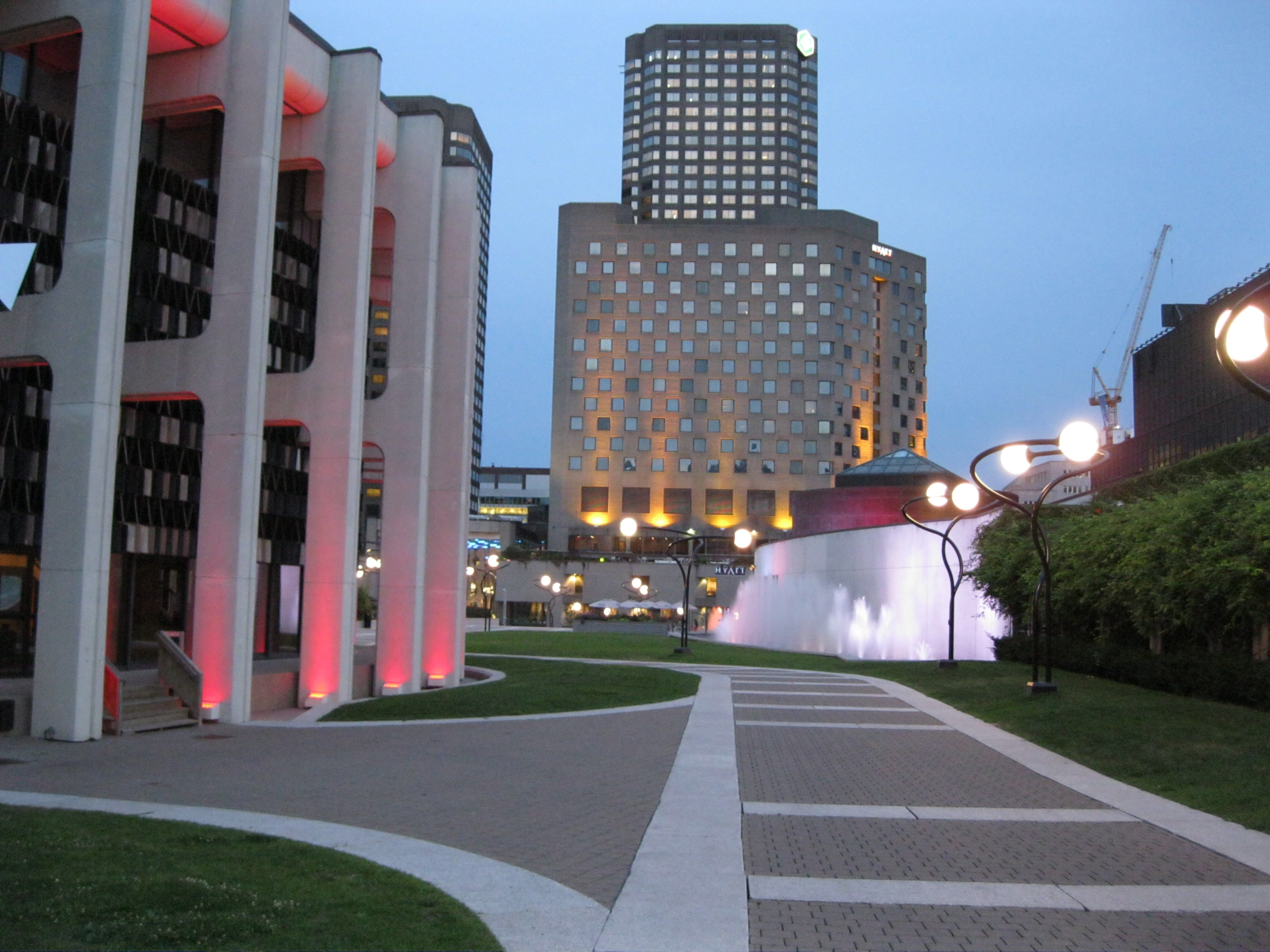

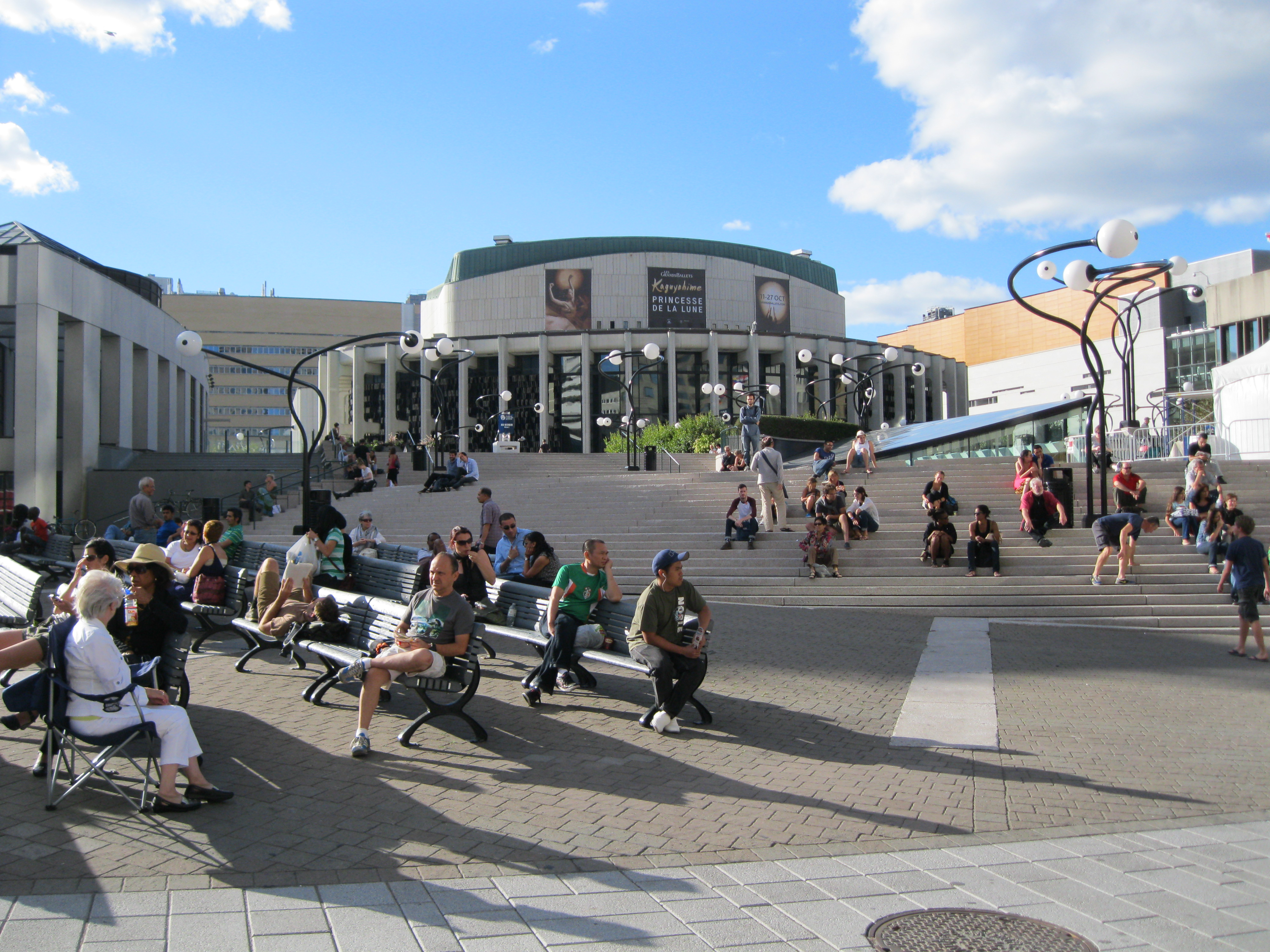

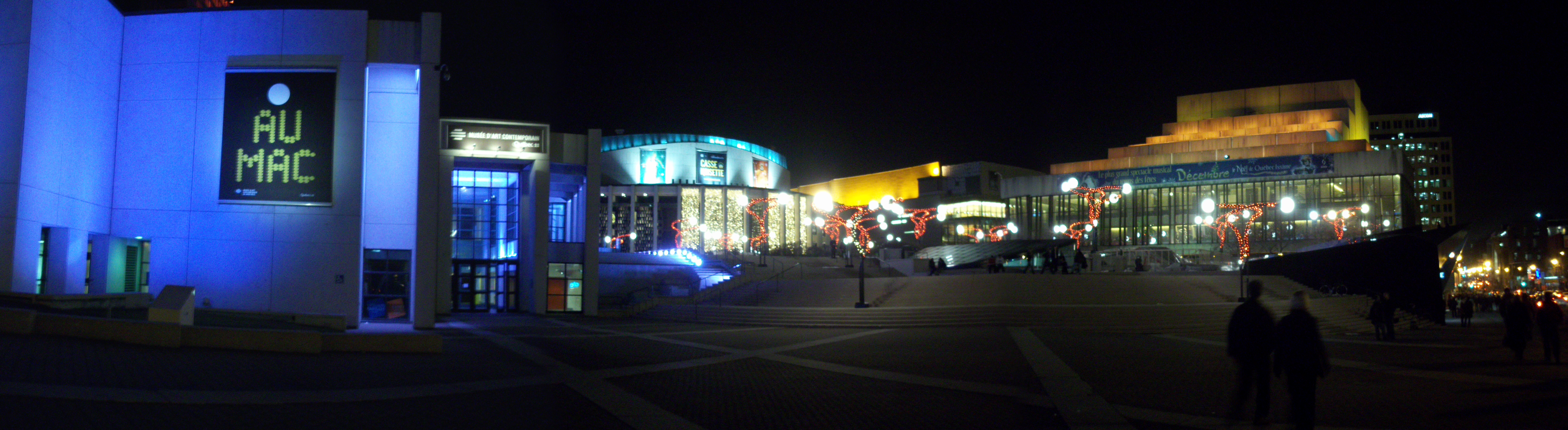

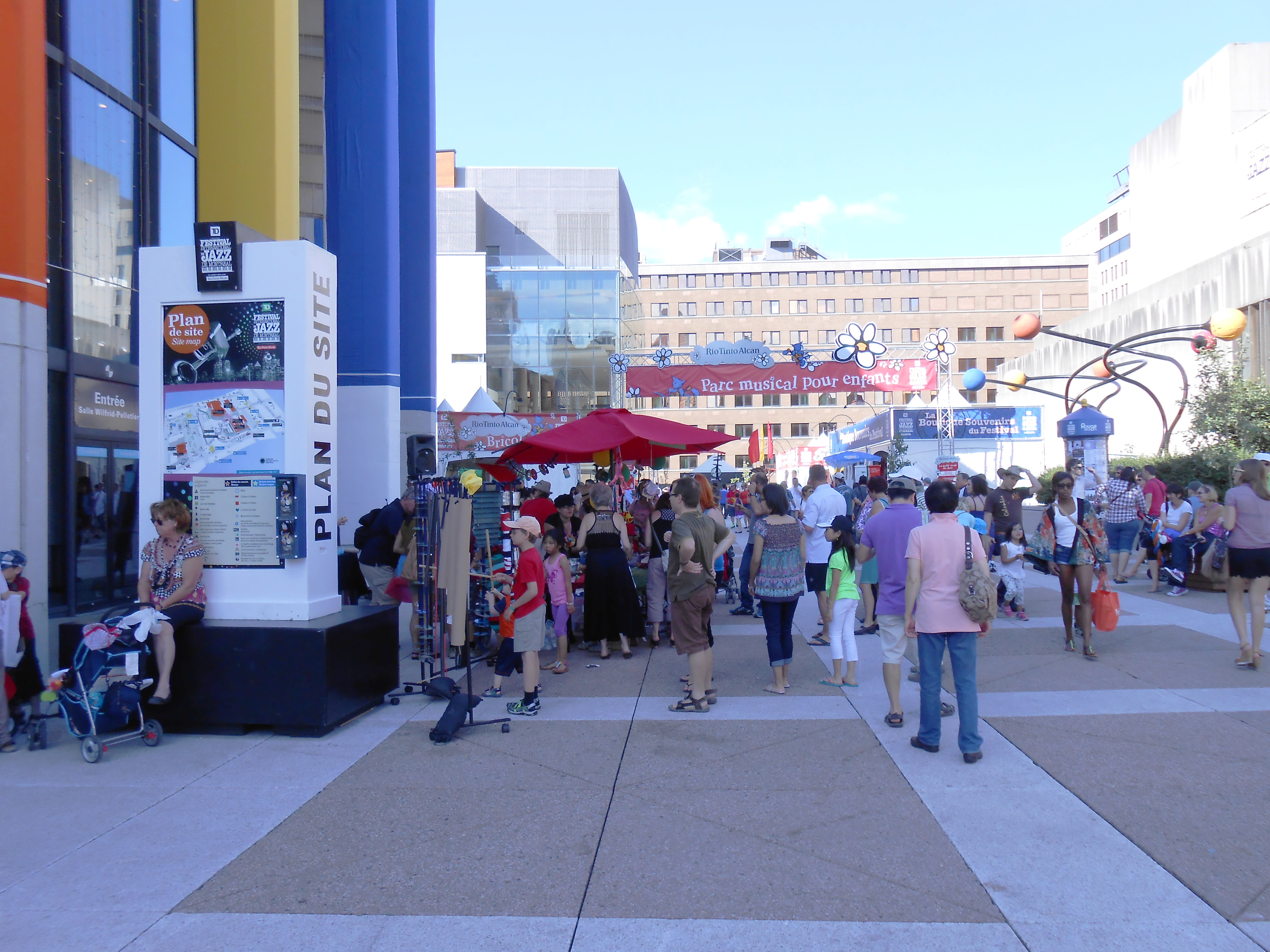

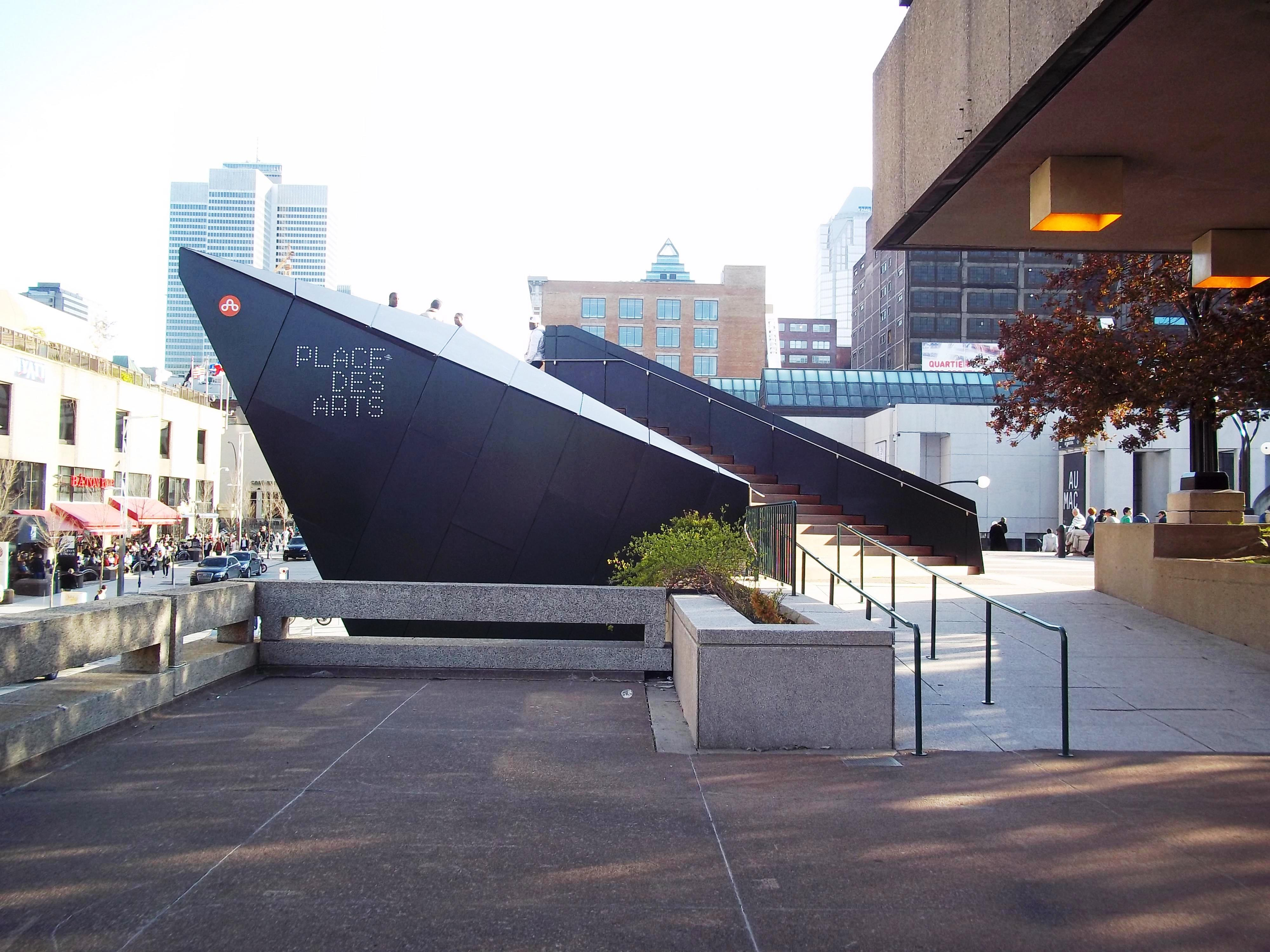

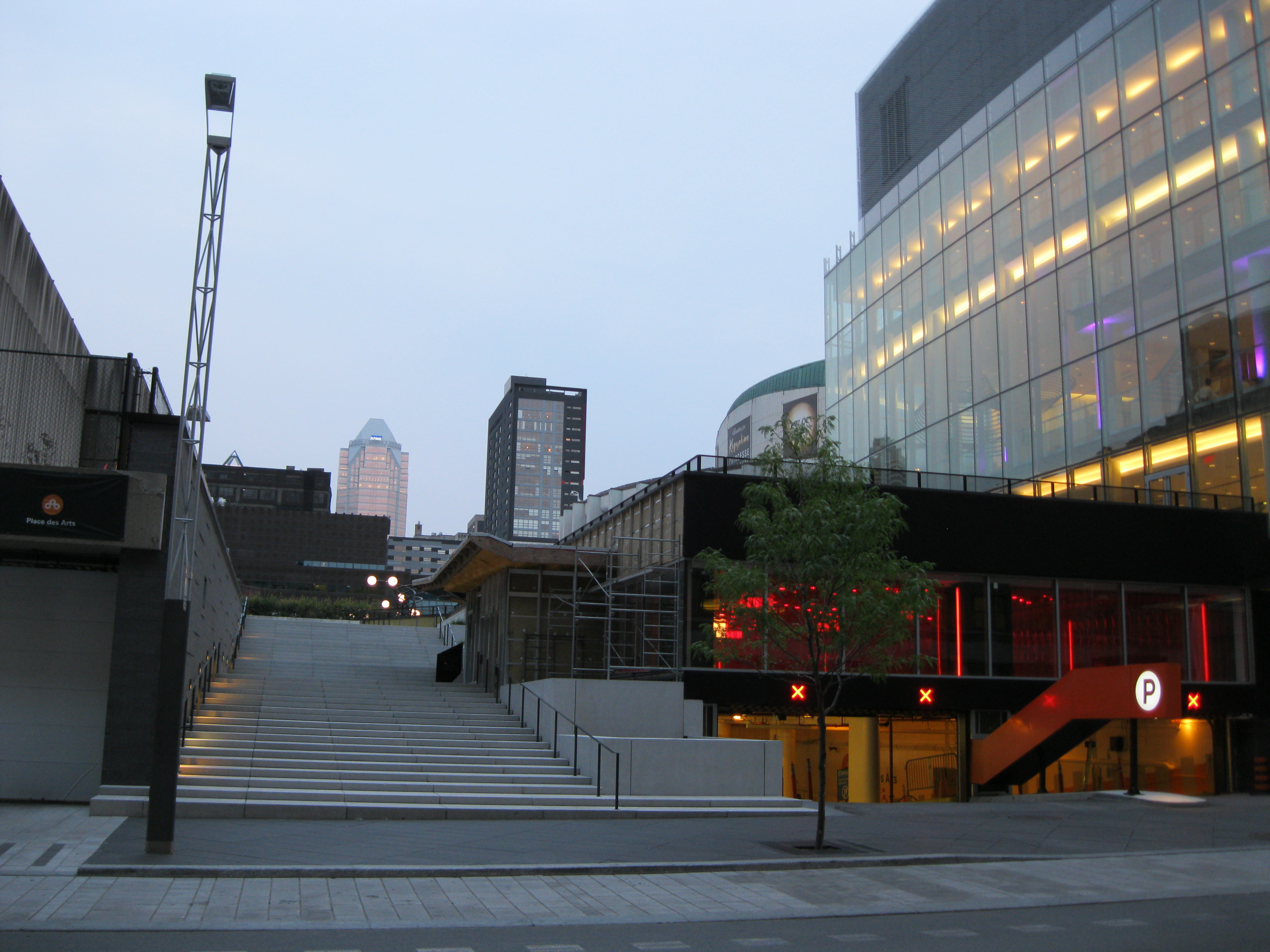

== See also ==
- List of concert halls
