= Bettinger =

Bettinger may refer to:

- Claude Bettinger sculptor and stained glass artist
- Franziskus von Bettinger, Archbishop of Munich
- Stephen L. Bettinger, Korean War flying ace
- Walt Bettinger, CEO of Charles Schwab Corporation
