= La Voie lactée =

Public artwork by Geneviève Cadieux in Montreal

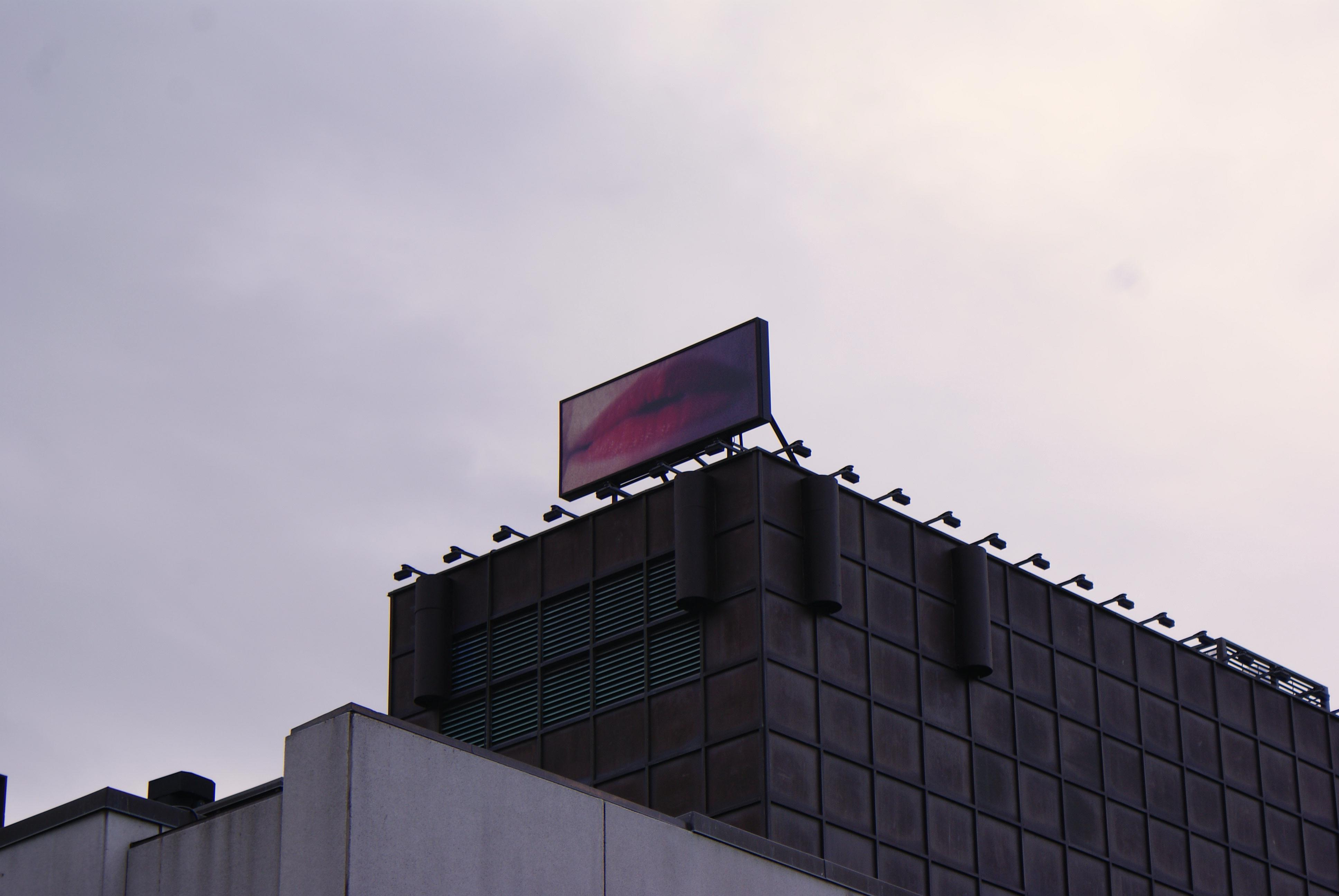
- Artist: Geneviève Cadieux
- Year: 1992
- Medium: Light panel (ink, translucent canvas in aluminum casing)
- Subject: Female lips wearing lipstick
- Dimensions: 183 cm × 457 cm (72 in × 180 in)
- Location: Roof of the Musée d'art contemporain de Montréal; Montreal, Quebec, Canada; 45°30′28″N 73°34′00″W
- Owner: Musée d'art contemporain de Montréal

La Voie lactée (French: [la vwa lak.te]; transl. "The Milky Way") is a public artwork by the Canadian artist Geneviève Cadieux. Since its unveiling in 1992, it has stood on the roof of the Musée d'art contemporain de Montréal (MACM), in the Quartier des spectacles district of Montreal. It consists of a billboard-style light panel depicting, in extreme close-up, female lips wearing red lipstick. The lips, which show signs of aging, are those of Cadieux's mother.

Cadieux was asked to create La Voie lactée by the MACM on the occasion of the museum's 1992 relocation in a new building on the Place des Arts. Her choice to depict a pair of giant red lips in the sky was inspired by the Man Ray surrealist painting À l’heure de l’observatoire – Les Amoureux. The photograph itself is a detail from one of Cadieux's earlier works. Upon its unveiling, La Voie lactée received critical acclaim. It was gifted by Cadieux to the MACM in 1995, along with a colour transparency allowing for new prints.

"La Voie lactée" is French for "The Milky Way", but many interpretations of the artwork argue that the title is a double entendre. Its homophone "La Voix lactée" translates to "The Milky Voice". Cadieux herself associated her artwork with the themes of voice, language and motherhood. Sexuality has also often been perceived as a theme. In 2011, Cadieux unveiled a companion piece of La Voie lactée in a station of the Paris Métro and titled it La Voix lactée. It is a mosaic reproducing the same photograph of her mother's lips.

La Voie lactée is a symbol of the MACM and one of the key artworks in its collection. As one of the most well-known public artworks in Montreal, it is also considered an icon of the city.

== Description ==
La Voie lactée is a light panel measuring 183 by 457 centimetres (72 in × 180 in), closely resembling a billboard in its format, installation and visibility. It depicts a woman's parted lips in a tightly framed extreme close-up. The lips, which are wearing red lipstick and show signs of aging, are those of Geneviève Cadieux's mother. La Voie lactée is an intentional homage to the Man Ray surrealist painting À l’heure de l’observatoire – Les Amoureux, which similarly shows a giant pair of disembodied red lips floating in the sky over a city. (Note: The lips painted by Man Ray were based on those of his collaborator and romantic partner, the photographer Lee Miller.)

The image in La Voie lactée is produced through inkjet printing on a translucent and flexible canvas. The canvas is framed in an aluminum casing and exposed on the rooftop of the Musée d'art contemporain de Montréal (MACM), which owns the artwork. It is visible from street level on Montreal's Place des Arts, near the intersection of Rue Sainte-Catherine and Rue Jeanne-Mance, in the Quartier des spectacles. The panel is neon-lit at night.

== Conception, unveiling and preservation ==
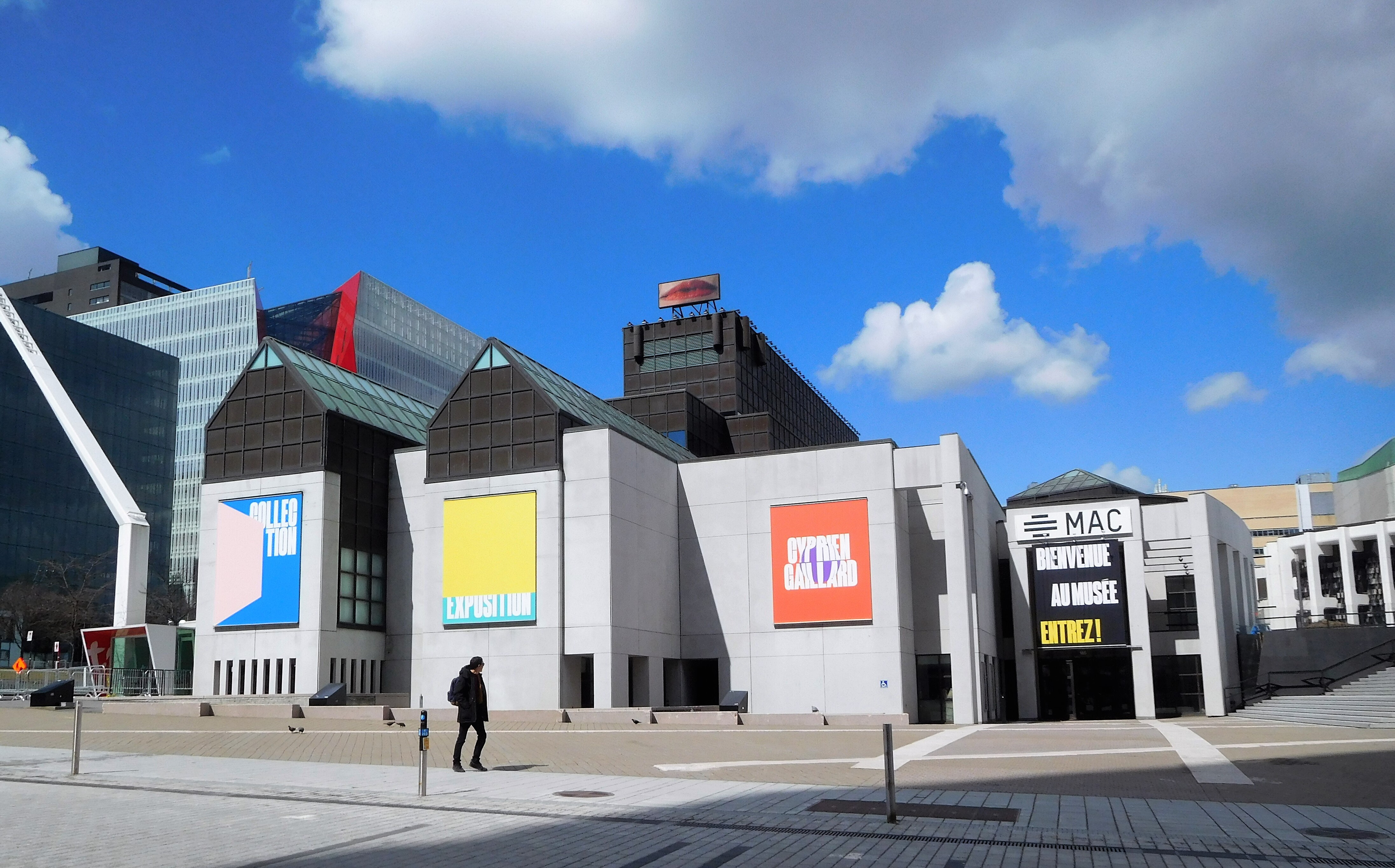
View of La Voie lactée from Rue Sainte-Catherine on the Place des Arts

In 1992, Geneviève Cadieux was asked by the MACM to create an artwork marking its relocation in a new building on the Place des Arts, as well as the 350th anniversary of the city of Montreal. (Note: One likely reason for choosing Cadieux was that the MACM was planning a retrospective on her work for the following year.) The artwork was to be part of Pour la suite du monde (transl. "So the World May Go On"), one of two inaugural exhibitions planned by the MACM. Cadieux's first idea for the project consisted of two large-scale photographic panels, one depicting a cloud and the other, a bruise. This evolved into La Voie lactée. The photograph she chose is a detail from a bust-length portrait of her mother, used in her 1991 installation Portrait de famille (transl. "Family Portrait").

Upon its unveiling, the artwork was critically acclaimed and received substantive news coverage. One Voir critic wrote that it "shines in the sky of Montreal, as if it had always belonged there". In 1995, Cadieux gifted La Voie lactée to the MACM, making it her sixth artwork in the museum's collection. She included a colour transparency to allow the MACM to create new prints, since each print has a longevity of only one to three years (with adequate UV protection). La Voie lactée was loaned only once, in 2001, to the Beaverbrook Art Gallery in Fredericton, New Brunswick.

== Interpretations ==
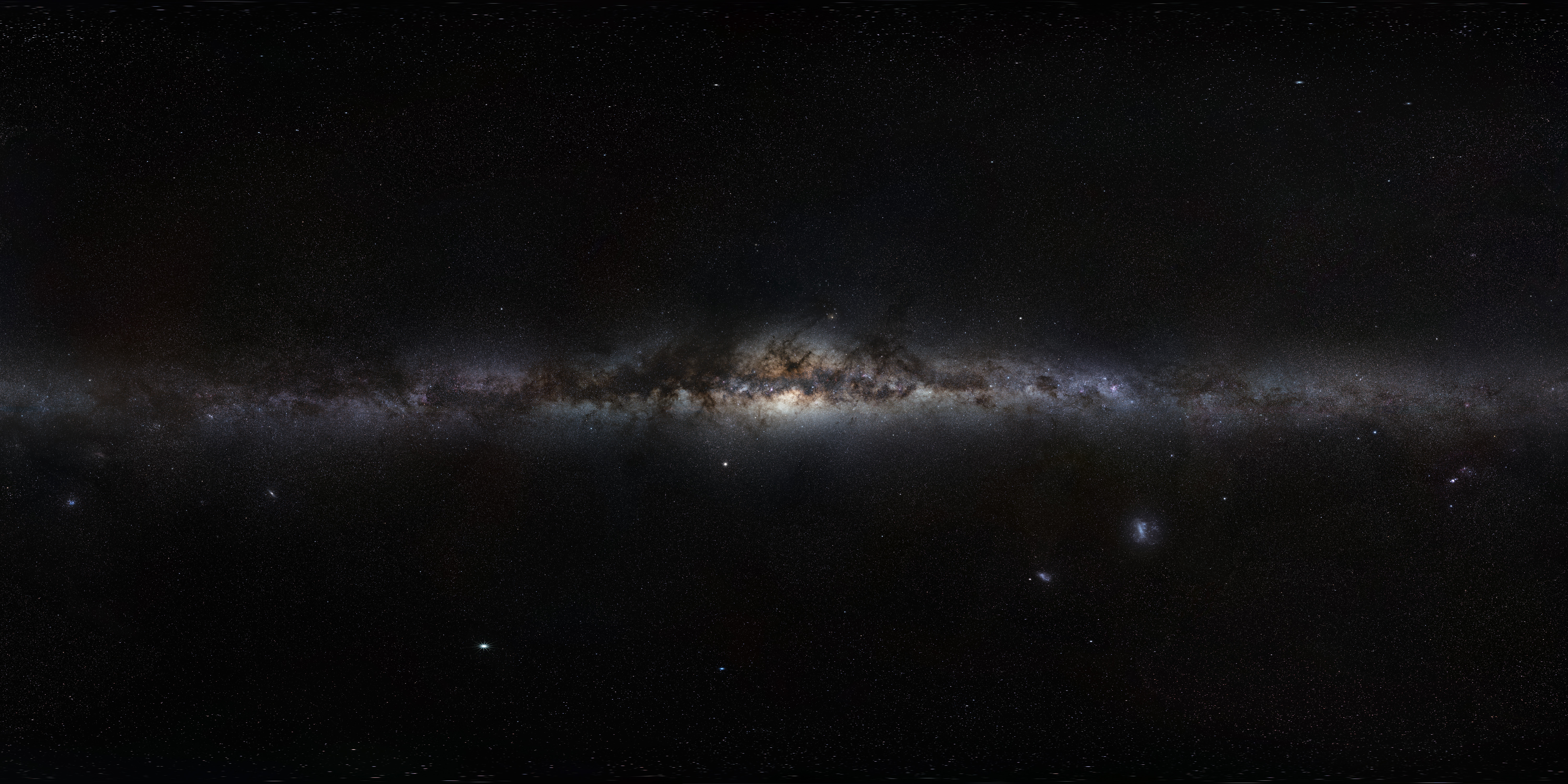
"La Voie lactée" is French for "The Milky Way"

Many interpretations of La Voie lactée revolve around the artwork's title, which is French for "the Milky Way", potentially evoking its placement against the Montreal sky. However, many perceive a double entendre; if the word "voie" is replaced with its homophone "voix", the title could translate to "The Milky Voice". Cadieux herself said that using the image of her mother's lips was akin to "claiming [her mother's] voice". She further said that her decision was inspired by the phrase "mother tongue" and the transmission of language from mother to child, as well as "the idea of the feminine voice on top of an institution". In 2011, Cadieux created a French companion piece to La Voie lactée, a mosaic of the same pair of lips in Paris, and titled it La Voix lactée.

The art historian Julie Lavigne interpreted the title of La Voie lactée as evoking two symbols of motherhood: Mother Nature and lactation. She wrote that the theme of mother-daughter relationships coexists in the artwork with that of sexuality, associated with the image of female lips wearing red lipstick. An ARTnews critic referred to those lips as "an erotic come-on". Many interpretors further compared them to vaginal lips, but also to a scar; Cadieux herself once described her artwork as "like a wound in the sky". According to the curator Josée Bélisle, the superimposition of a mother's lips over the natural landscape evokes "a symbol of language, creative power and the origin of existence." Lavigne summarized her own interpretation of La Voie lactée by describing it as "a cultural, political, and public manifestation of the intimate".

== Legacy ==
La Voie lactée is a symbol of the MACM and one of the key artworks in its collection. It is also among the most well-known public artworks in Montreal and is considered an icon of the city. In 2015, the photograph of the lips was featured on a set of stamps by Canada Post, commemorating "some of the quintessential Canadian photographs of the past 150 years".

=== La Voix lactée ===
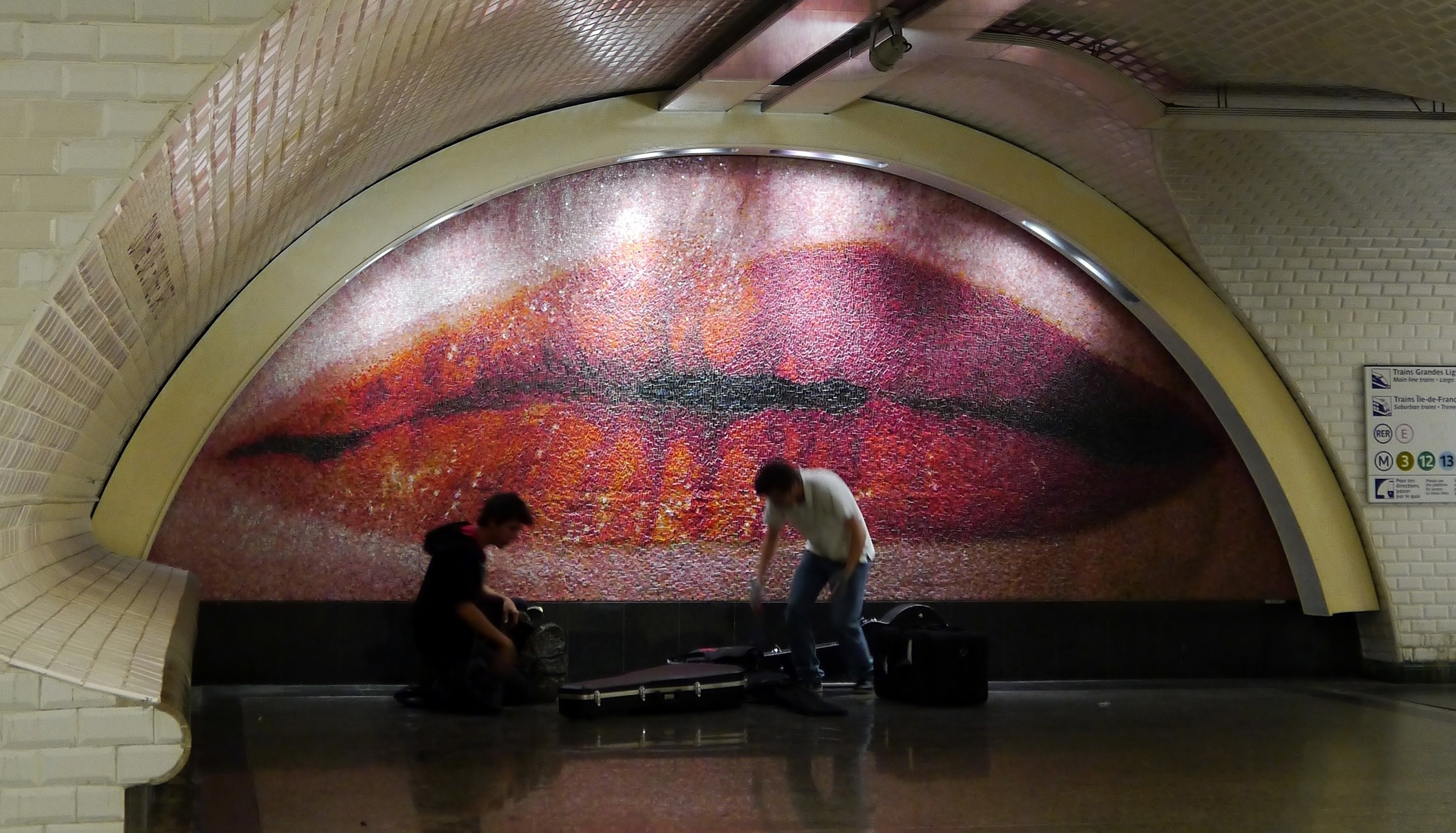
La Voix lactée (2011) inside Saint-Lazare station

In 2011, Cadieux unveiled a companion piece to La Voie lactée. Homophonically titled La Voix lactée (transl. "The Milky Voice"), the artwork is a glass-tile mosaic reproducing the same photograph of Cadieux's mother's lips, again in a large format. It is located inside Saint-Lazare station, one of the busiest stations of the Paris Métro. Montreal's public transport agency, the Société de transport de Montréal (STM), gifted the mosaic to its Paris counterpart, the Régie autonome des transports parisiens (RATP), in recognition of the latter's technical contributions towards the creation of the Montreal Metro in the 1960s. The gift also fulfilled a pledge by the STM to donate a public artwork to the RATP, in exchange for the Hector Guimard metro entrance which the RATP gifted to the Montreal Metro's Square-Victoria–OACI station in 2003. (Note: The Guimard metro entrance had initially been loaned to Montreal in 1966. In 2003, the RATP restored it and officially donated it.) The STM's pledge entailed that the gifted artwork would be themed around the French language.

La Voix lactée is accompanied by an excerpt from a poem by the French Canadian writer Anne Hébert, who lived for some time in Paris: (Note: The poem, titled "Une fois seulement" (transl. "Only Once"), was published in the 1992 anthology Œuvre poétique 1950-1990.)

French

Bien avant les images et les couleurs
La source du chant s'imaginait
À bouche fermée
Comme une chimère captive

Translation:
English

Long before images and colours
The source of the song was imagined
With closed mouth
Like a captive chimera.
