= Saint-Lazare station (Paris Metro) =

Paris Métro station

Saint-Lazare
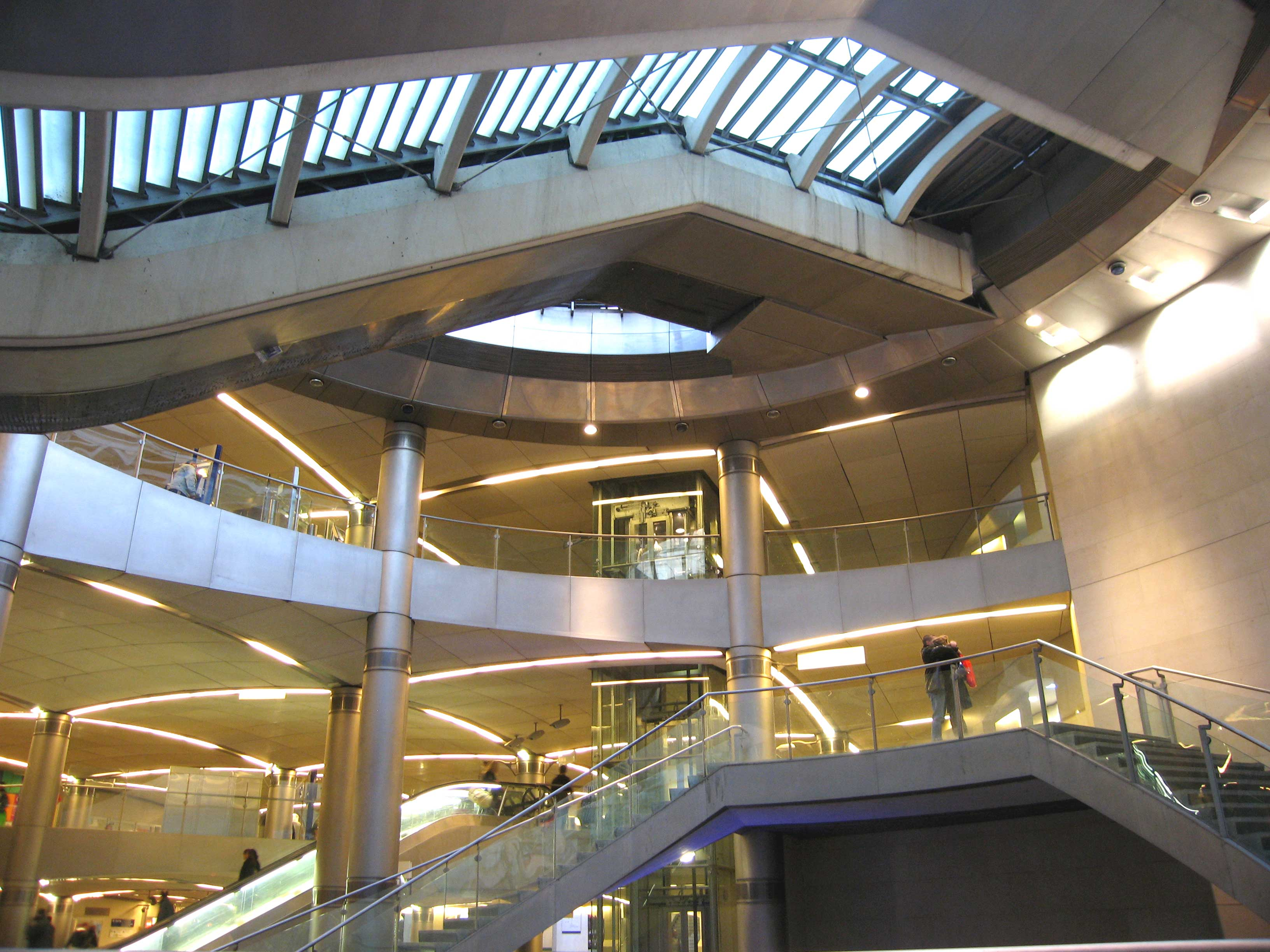
- View of the main staircase

General information
- Location: Gare Saint-Lazare; Paris; France
- Coordinates: 48°52′32″N 2°19′36″E
- Operator: RATP Group
- Connections: RER RER A RER E Paris Metro Paris Metro Line 9 Transilien Transilien Line J (Paris-Saint-Lazare) Transilien Line L (Paris-Saint-Lazare) Bus

Construction
- Accessible: Yes

Other information
- Fare zone: 1

History
- Opened: 19 October 1904

Passengers
- 2021: 33,128,384

Services
Preceding station	Paris Metro	Following station
Europe towards Pont de Levallois–Bécon	Line 3	Havre–Caumartin towards Gallieni
Madeleine towards Mairie d'Issy	Line 12	Trinité–d'Estienne d'Orves towards Mairie d'Aubervilliers
Miromesnil towards Châtillon–Montrouge	Line 13	Liège towards Les Courtilles or Saint-Denis–Université
Pont Cardinet towards Saint-Denis–Pleyel	Line 14	Madeleine towards Aéroport d'Orly
Connections to other stations
Miromesnil towards Pont de Sèvres	Line 9 transfer at Saint-Augustin	Havre–Caumartin towards Mairie de Montreuil
Preceding station	RER	Following station
Charles de Gaulle–Étoile towards Saint-Germain-en-Laye, Cergy-le-Haut or Poissy	RER A transfer at Auber	Châtelet–Les Halles towards Boissy-Saint-Léger or Marne-la-Vallée–Chessy
Neuilly–Porte Maillot towards Nanterre–La Folie	RER E transfer at Haussmann–Saint-Lazare	Magenta towards Chelles–Gournay or Tournan
Location
- Location within Paris

Saint-Lazare station (French pronunciation: [sɛ̃ lazaʁ]) is a station on Line 3, Line 12, Line 13 and Line 14 of the Paris Métro. Line 9 also stops at Saint Augustin and RER E stops at Haussmann–Saint-Lazare. A tunnel connects both of these stations. Located on the border of the 8th and 9th arrondissements, it is the second busiest station of the Métro system after Gare du Nord with 39 million passengers annually.

The station offers connections to the following other stations: Gare Saint-Lazare (SNCF), Haussmann–Saint-Lazare on RER E, Havre–Caumartin on Line 3 and Line 9, in addition to Saint-Augustin on Line 9. The station is named after the mainline railway station, which is situated in Rue Saint-Lazare. It is in the commercial centre of Paris, near the major department stores.

== Location ==
The station is located near the Paris-Saint-Lazare station, with eight platforms serving four lines.

- The platforms for Line 3 are located under the Cour de Rome, along the northeast / southeast axis of Rue de Rome, just above the tunnel for Line 13.
- The platforms for Line 12 are located on an east–west axis under Rue Saint-Lazare, between Place du Havre and Rue de Caumartin.
- The platforms for Line 13 are aligned with the station on line 12 under the same street, between the Cour du Havre and the Cour de Rome, along the Hilton Paris Opéra hotel.
- The platforms for Line 14 are located deep below the Cour de Rome, along a northeast / southwest axis.

== History ==
The station opened on 14 October 1904, four days after the opening of the first section of Line 3 between Père Lachaise and Villiers.

The Line 12 platforms opened on 5 November 1910 as part of the Nord-Sud Company's Line A from Porte de Versailles to Notre-Dame-de-Lorette. The Line 13 platforms opened on 26 February 1911 as part of the same company's Line B from Saint-Lazare to Porte de Saint-Ouen. It was the southern terminus of the line until 27 June 1973 when it was extended to Miromesnil. On 27 March 1931, the Nord-Sud Company was taken over by the Compagnie du chemin de fer métropolitain de Paris and Line A became Line 12 of the Métro and Line B became Line 13.

On 12 July 1999, the RER station of Haussmann–Saint-Lazare was opened. On 16 December 2003, the Line 14 platforms were opened with the extension of the line from Madeleine. On the same day, a corridor opened connecting to the station of Saint-Augustin on Line 9.

== Passenger services ==
=== Access ===
The station has 11 entrances:

- Entrance 1: Cour de Rome: escalators (entry and exit), staircase to the Cour de Rome. The access is equipped with a glass entrance (La Lentille) whose creator was Jean-Marie Charpentier;
- Entrance 2: Place du Havre: two staircases at 13 Place du Havre;
- Entrance 3: Passage du Havre: two staircases at 14 Place du Havre and direct access to the Passage du Havre shopping center;
- Entrance 4: Galerie des Marchands: escalators (entrance and exit) to the shopping mall in connecting with the SNCF station;
- Entrance 5: Rue Intérieur: Rue Intérieur (access to the SNCF station);
- Entrance 6: Place Gabriel-Péri: Place Gabriel-Péri;
- Entrance 7: Rue de l'Arcade: 62 Rue de l'Arcade (corner Rue de Rome);
- Entrance 8: Rue d'Amsterdam: a staircase opposite 2 Rue d'Amsterdam;
- Entrance 9: Cour du Havre: an escalator at the Cour du Havre exit;
- Entrance 10: Rue Caumartin: a staircase at 95-97 Rue Saint-Lazare;
- Entrance 11: Rue Saint-Lazare: 92 Rue Saint-Lazare.

=== Station layout ===
The platforms are connected by a mezzanine, which has entrances/exits to street level. The platforms are listed by line number.

==== Line 3 ====
Side platform, doors will open on the right
Westbound	← toward Pont de Levallois–Bécon (Europe)
Eastbound	toward Gallieni (Havre–Caumartin) →
Side platform, doors will open on the right

==== Line 12 ====
Side platform, doors will open on the right
Southbound	← toward Mairie d'Issy (Madeleine)
Northbound	toward Mairie d'Aubervilliers (Trinité–d'Estienne d'Orves) →
Side platform, doors will open on the right

==== Line 13 ====
Side platform with PSDs, doors will open on the right
Southbound	← toward Châtillon–Montrouge (Miromesnil)
Northbound	toward Les Courtilles or Saint-Denis-Université (Liège) →
Side platform with PSDs, doors will open on the right

==== Line 14 ====
Side platform with PSDs, doors will open on the right
Northbound	← toward Saint-Denis–Pleyel (Pont Cardinet)
Southbound	toward Aéroport d'Orly (Madeleine) →
Side platform with PSDs, doors will open on the right

=== Corridors ===
The ticket hall, or rotunda, located under the Place du Havre between the stations of lines 12 and 13 has been called "one of the architectural masterpieces of the Métro". It was designed by the architect Lucien Bechmann in the form of a large rotunda, a legacy of the former Nord-Sud company. Its metallic vault, comprises eight interlocking pillars, is adorned with mouldings and ceramic tiles with light brown and green motifs, while the vault is tiled in white with green friezes. Pillars regularly receive backlit advertising posters during certain event campaigns. Following a 2004 restoration of the pillars, only the vault itself is original.

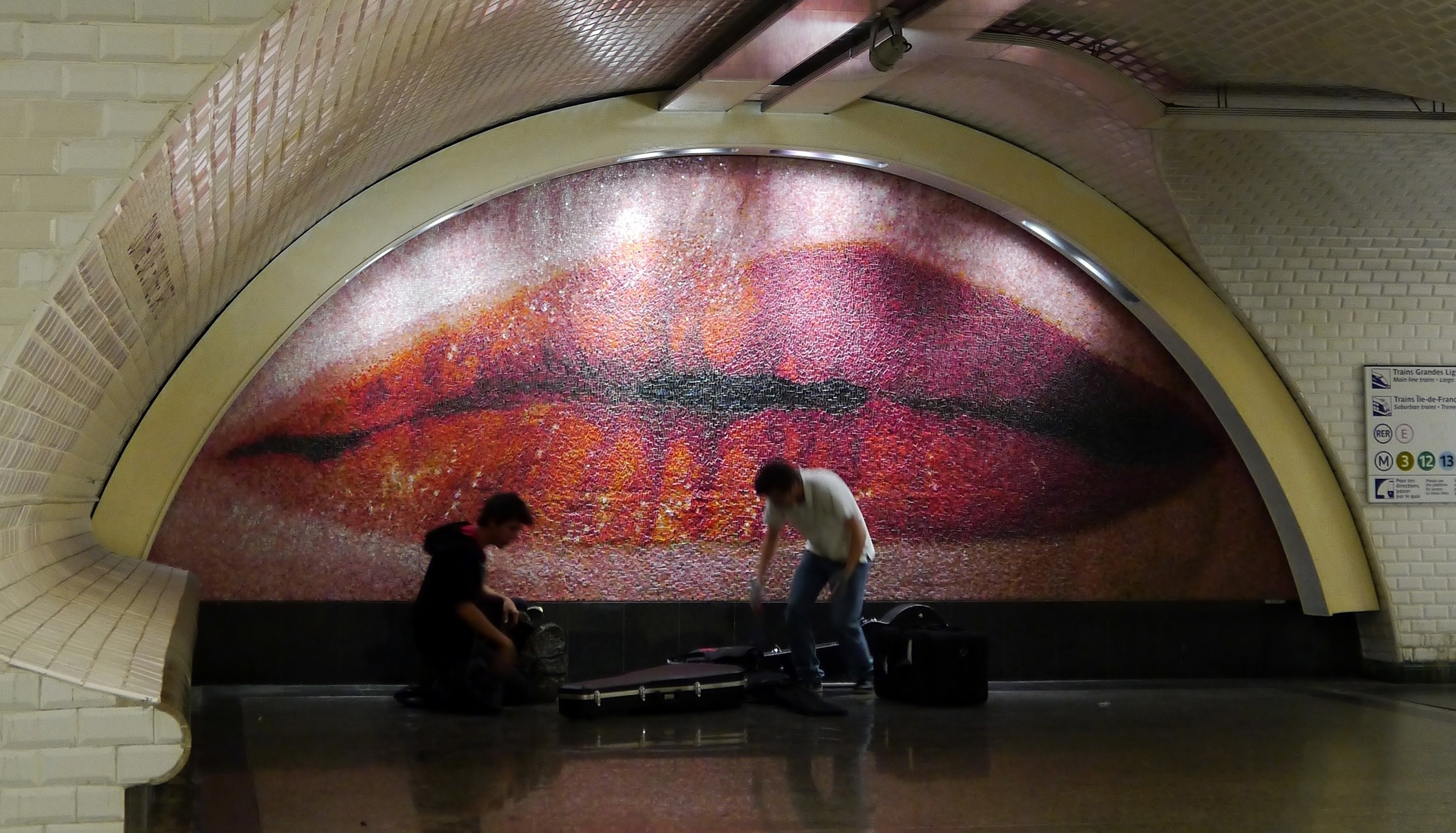
La Voix lactée (2011) by Geneviève Cadieux, in the corridor to Saint-Augustin station

A corridor connects Saint-Augustin on Line 9 to the southwest end of Line 14 Saint-Lazare metro station and, as a result, to Gare Saint-Lazare. In addition, it is possible through other corridors to reach the Opera station via the platforms of Haussmann–Saint-Lazare (RER E), then to Havre–Caumartin, the hall of Auber of the RER A line and finally the corridor leading to Line 7 and 8 at Opera station. This continuity, putting together several connections from the Saint-Augustin station to the Opera station, is the longest of the Paris metro.

Since 2011, the mosaic La Voix lactée by Quebec artist Geneviève Cadieux has been installed in the connecting corridor connecting line 14 to line 9 (Saint-Augustin station).

One of the main accesses is located on the "Cour de Rome". This access is called "La lentille" (the Lens) and consists of a glass bubble to protect passengers from bad weather during the ascent, and to allow light to enter the station. Underneath there is a large circular access shaft, with many escalators, which is the old TBM (Tunnel Boring Machine) access shaft for the construction of the extension to St Lazare. This access shaft allows direct access to the lines 3/13/14, the other lines being further away.

=== Platforms ===
The platforms of the four lines are standard configuration. Two per stop, they are separated by the metro tracks located in the center.

The platforms of Line 3 are built flush with the wall. The ceiling consists of a metal deck whose beams, silver in colour, are supported by vertical pillars. They are laid out in the Andreu-Motte style in neutral tones with two bright grey-green light canopies, the walls and tunnel exits are covered with large white flat tiles as well as grey tiled benches deprived of seats. The advertisements are devoid of frames and the station's name is inscribed in Parisine font on enamelled plates.

On lines 12 and 13, the vault is elliptical, and the lower part of the walls are vertical, a shape specific to the old Nord-Sud stations. They are among the rare stations of this company not to have found their original style, only the green earthenware advertising frames being renewed. Their decoration is quite similar, approaching the style used for most metro stations, with white and rounded lighting canopies in the Gaudin style of the renouveau du métro des années 2000 renovations and bevelled white ceramic tiles covering the walls, the vault and the tunnel exits, on line 12, while the vault of line 13, lower, is painted white. The station on line 13 is also distinguished by the presence of platform screen doors and the absence of seats due to its frequent usage, unlike the platforms of line 12 equipped with white Motte style seats. The name of the station is written in Parisine font on enamelled plates in both cases.

The station of line 14 is established at great depth under the well of the Cour de Rome, which disrupts the elliptical vault in the form of a large glass footbridge and brings a little natural light on the platforms. Like the other stations on the line, it has a modern and sober decoration with light concrete as well as glass planks on the walls, platforms tiled in light grey, equipped with wooden seats and platform doors. The name of the station appears in Parisine script on backlit panels embedded in the sidewalls and on stickers affixed to the platform facades. The platforms are designed to accommodate trains of 120 meters long, but are only fitted out over 90 meters because the lack of space in the turnaround loop (very rare situation that the station shares with Place Monge on line 7). This was fixed towards the end of 2019, when the platforms were extended to be able to accommodate the MP 14 trainsets with eight cars.

=== Other connections ===
The station has, since 14 July 1999, a direct connection, with the Haussmann – Saint-Lazare station on line E of the RER.

It is also served by lines 20, 21, 22, 26, 27, 28, 29, 32, 42, 43, 66, 80, 94, 95 and 528 of the RATP Bus Network and, by night, by lines N01, N02, N15, N16, N51, N52, N53, N150, N151, N152, N153 and N154 from the Noctilien network.

== Nearby ==
- Gare Saint-Lazare
- Hilton Paris Opéra
- Passage du Havre

== Gallery ==
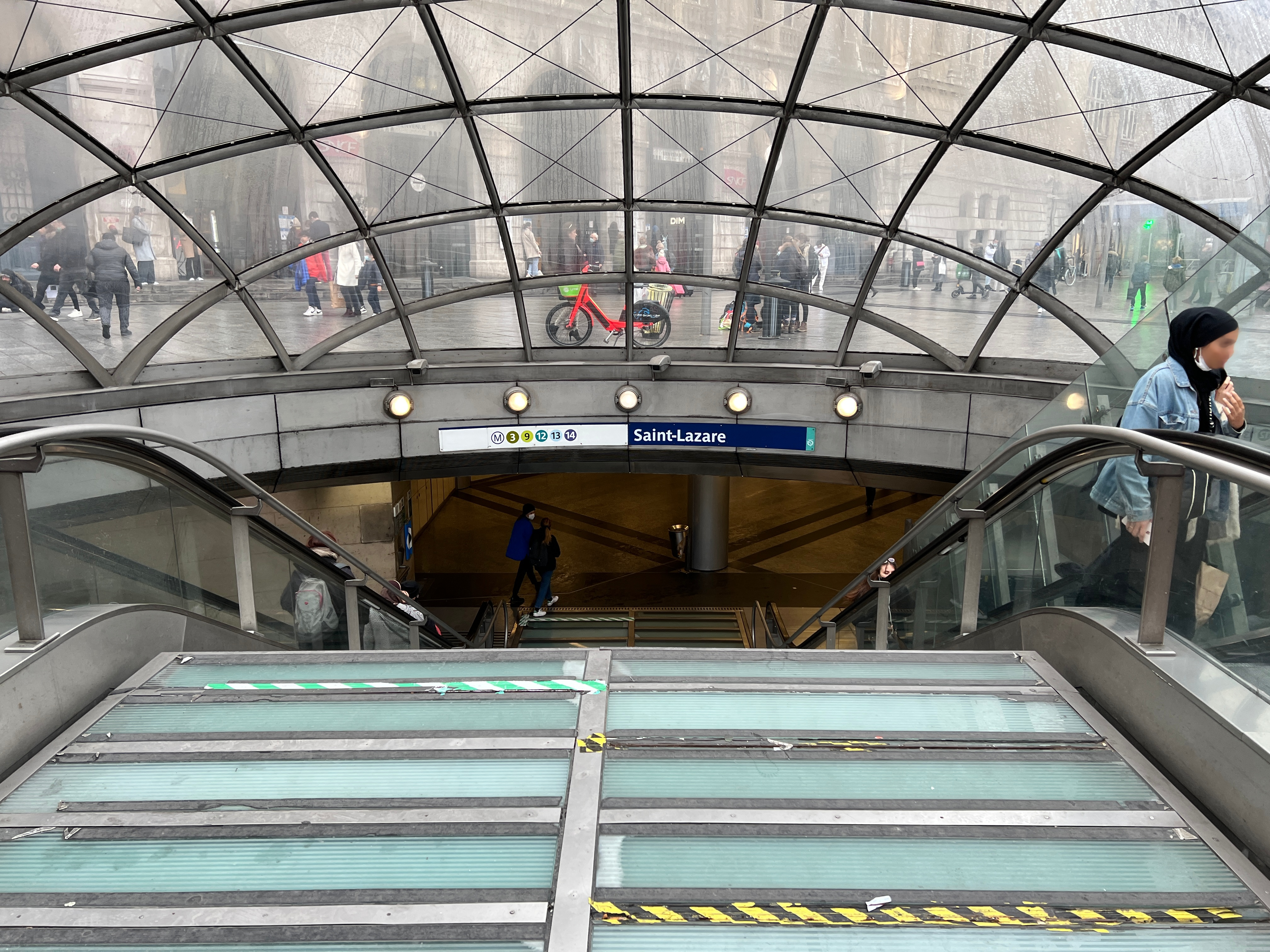
Saint-Lazare entrance

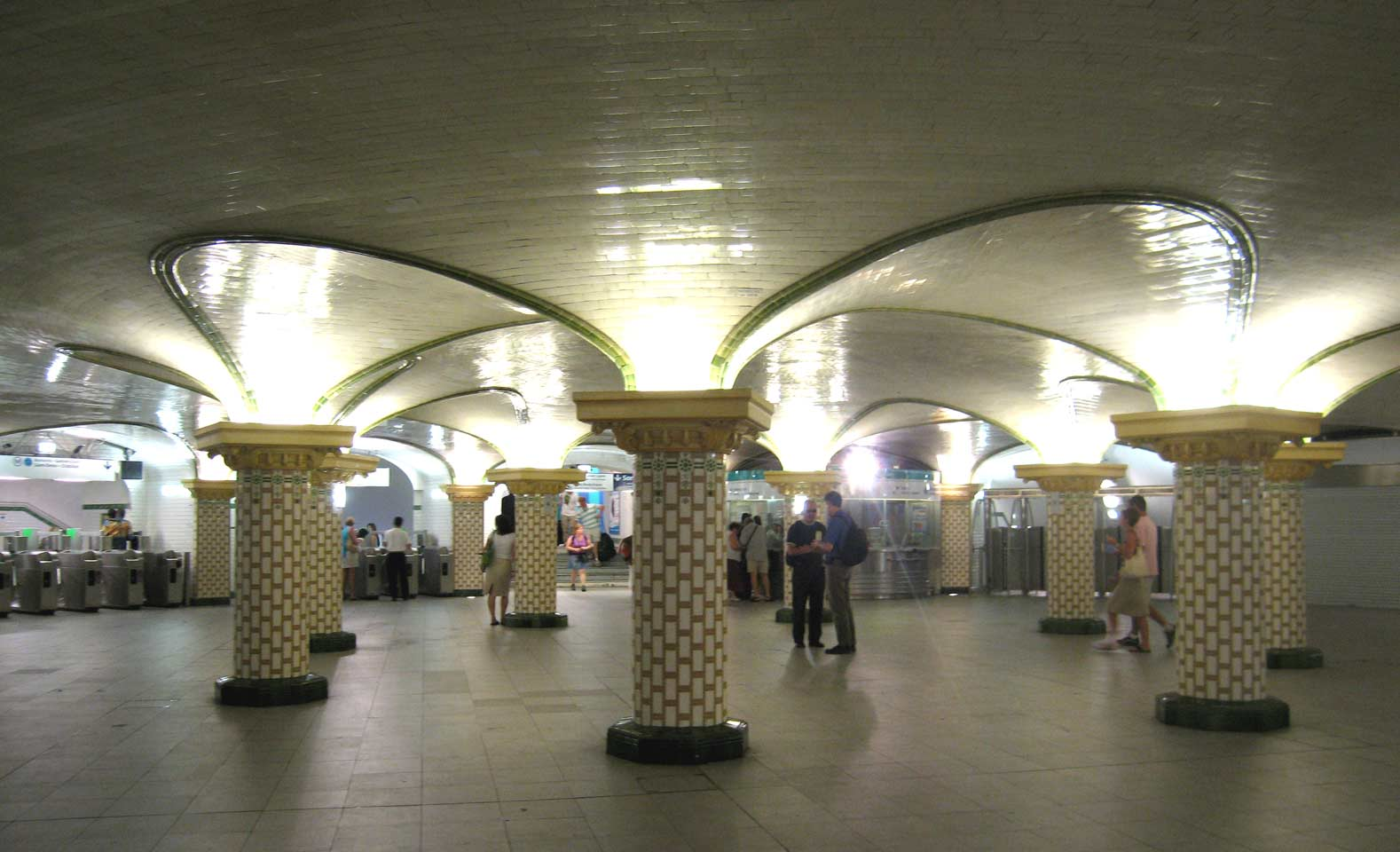
Saint-Lazare ticket hall

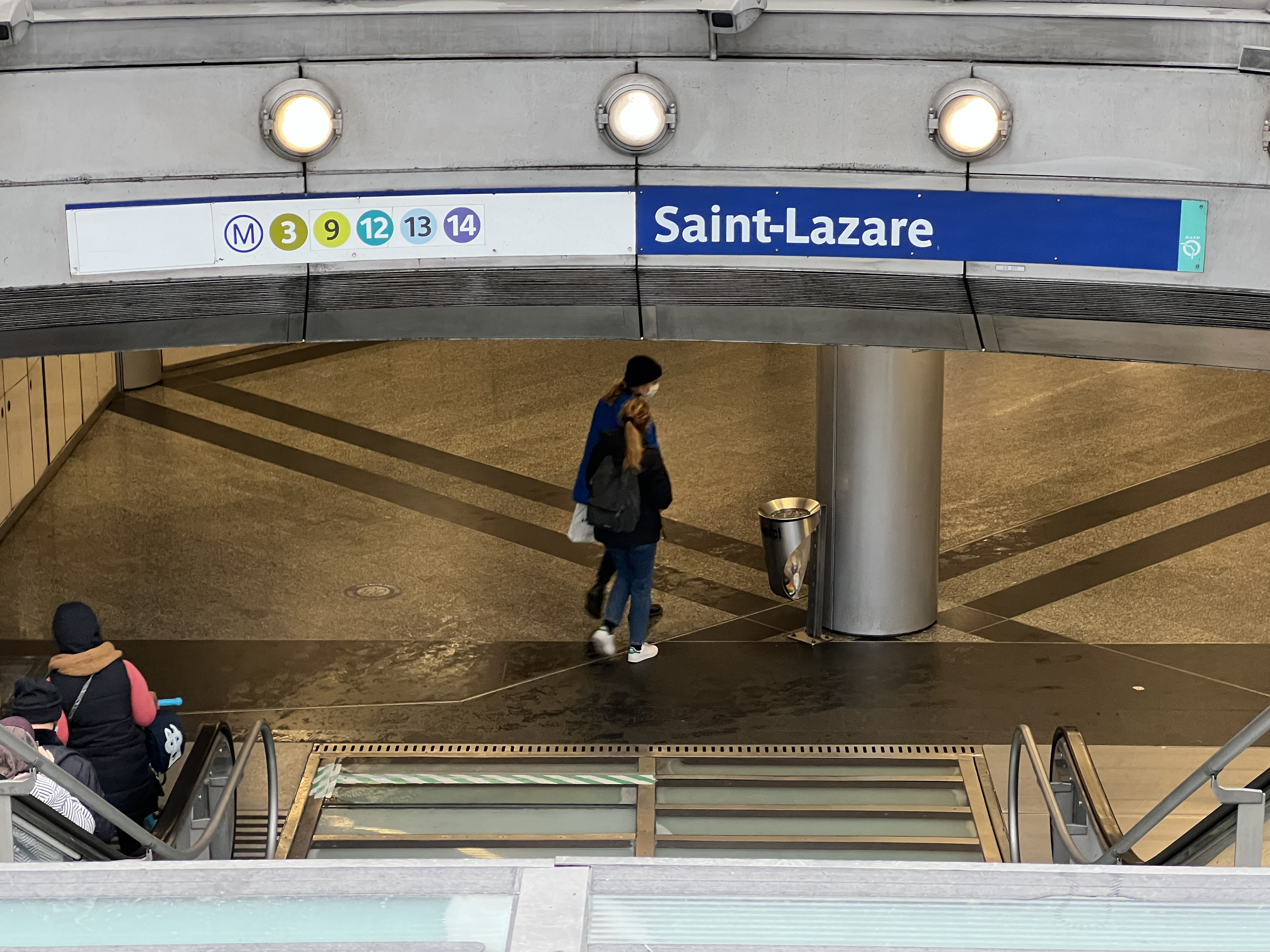
Saint-Lazare station interchange

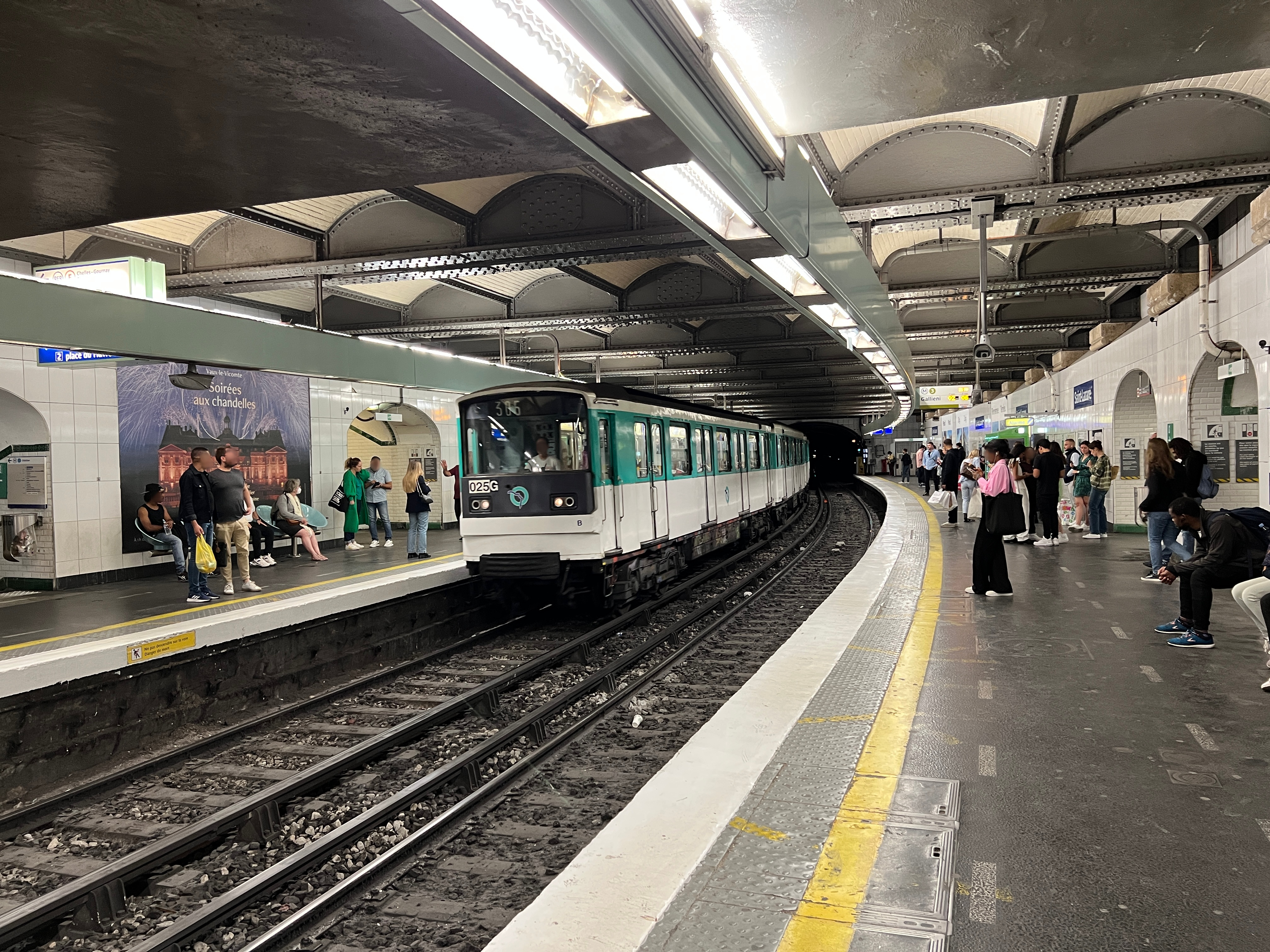
Line 3 platforms

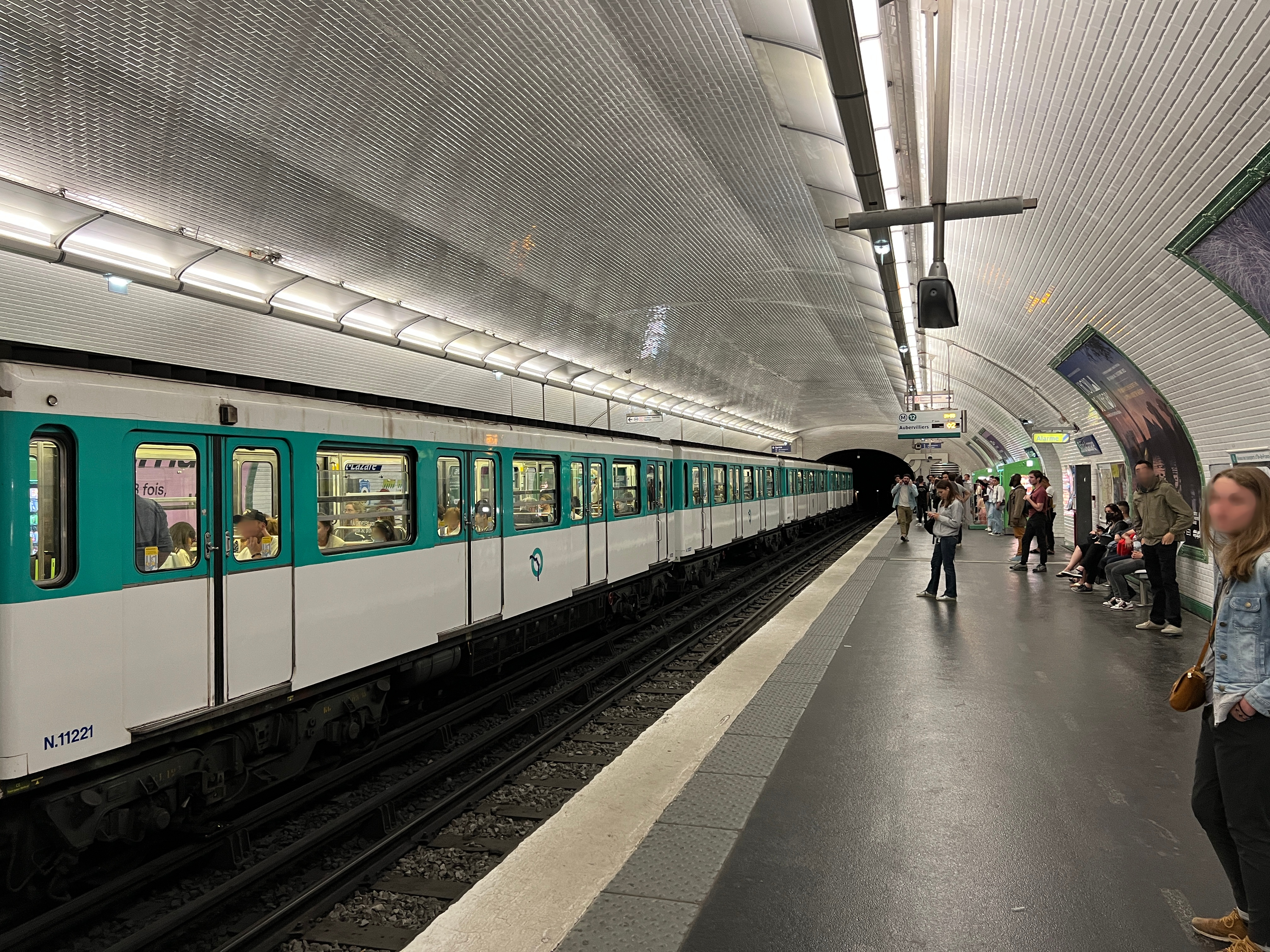
Line 12 platforms

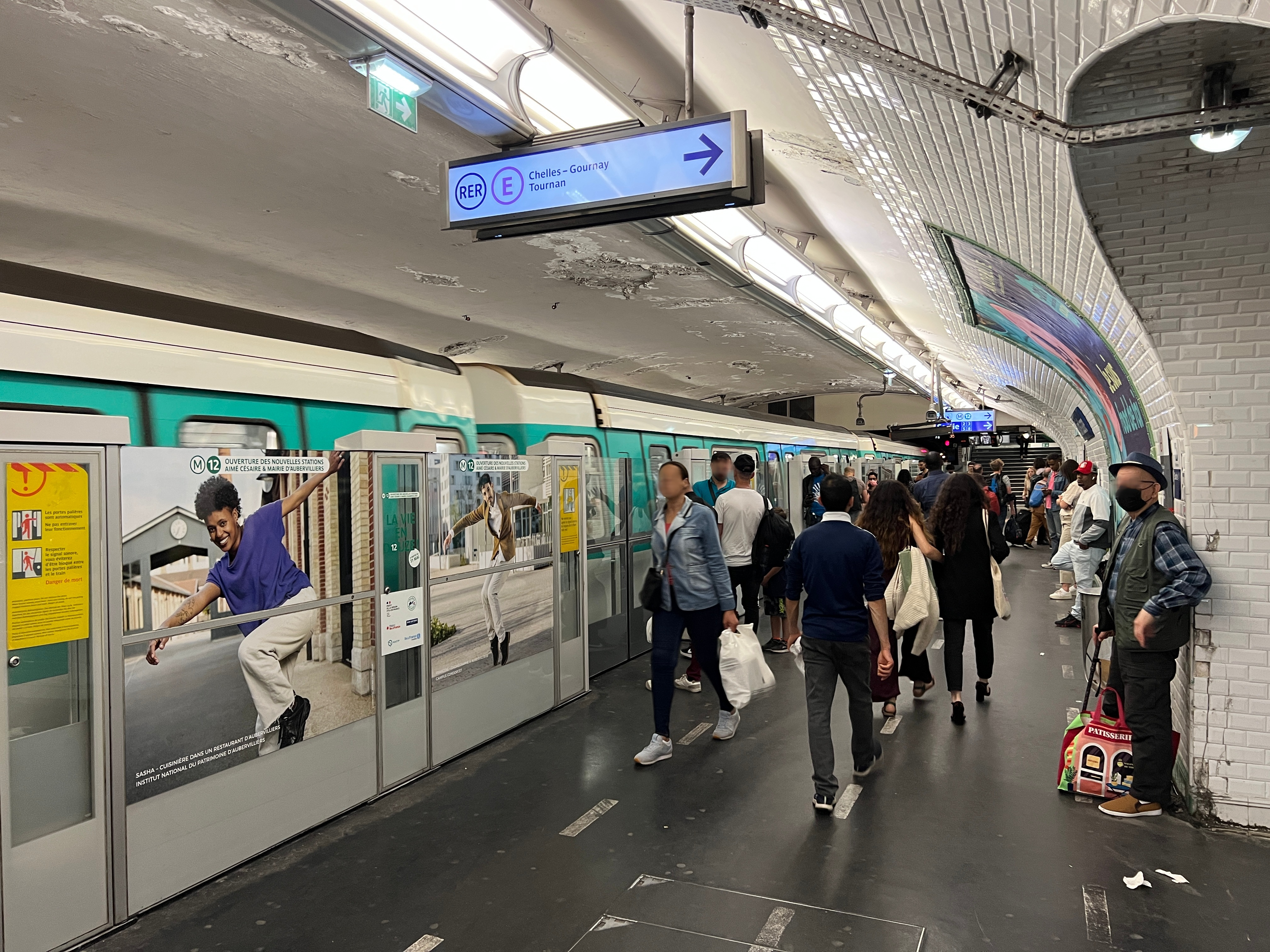
Line 13 platforms with automatic platform gates (closed)

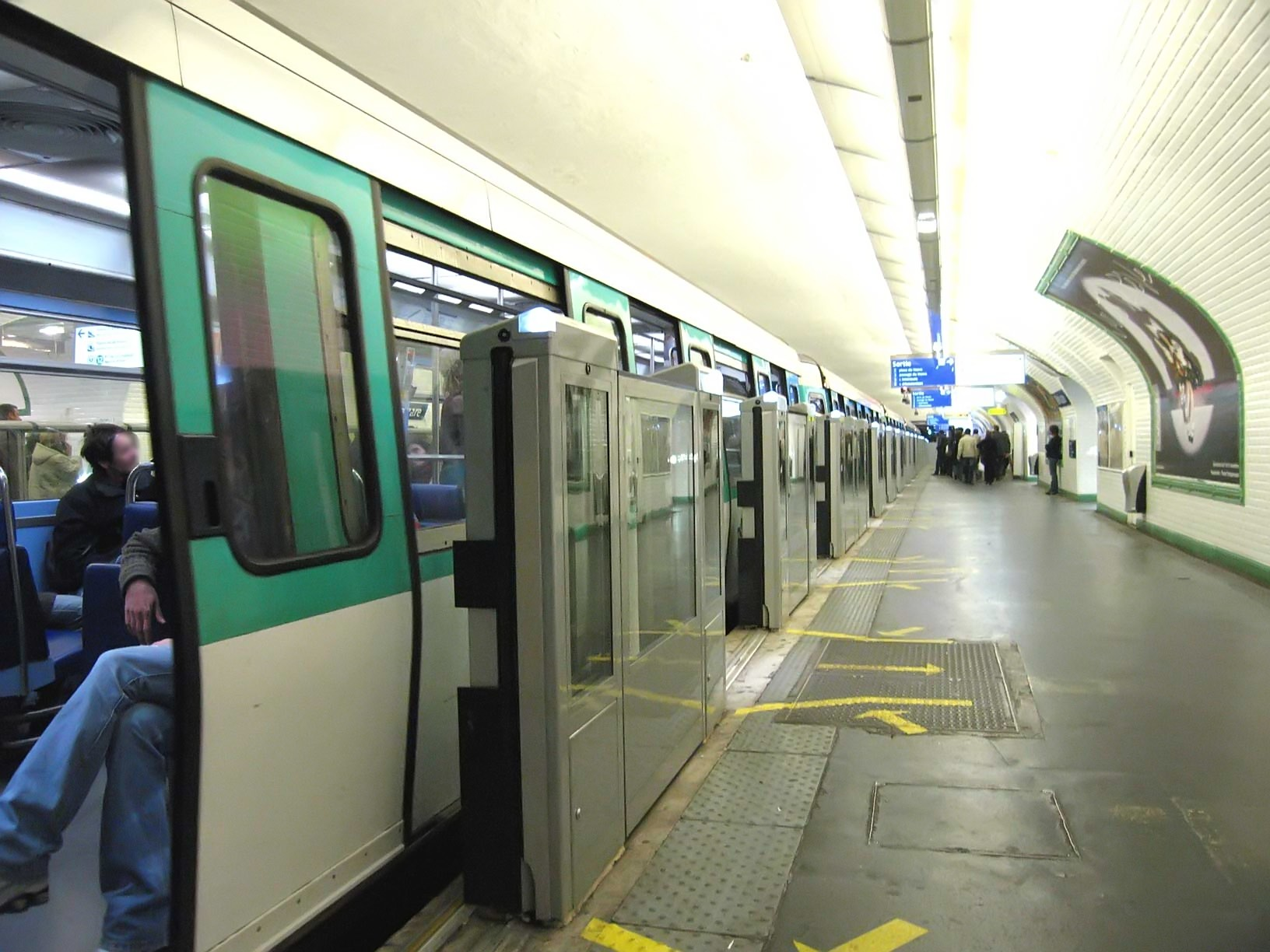
Line 13 platforms with automatic platform gates (open)

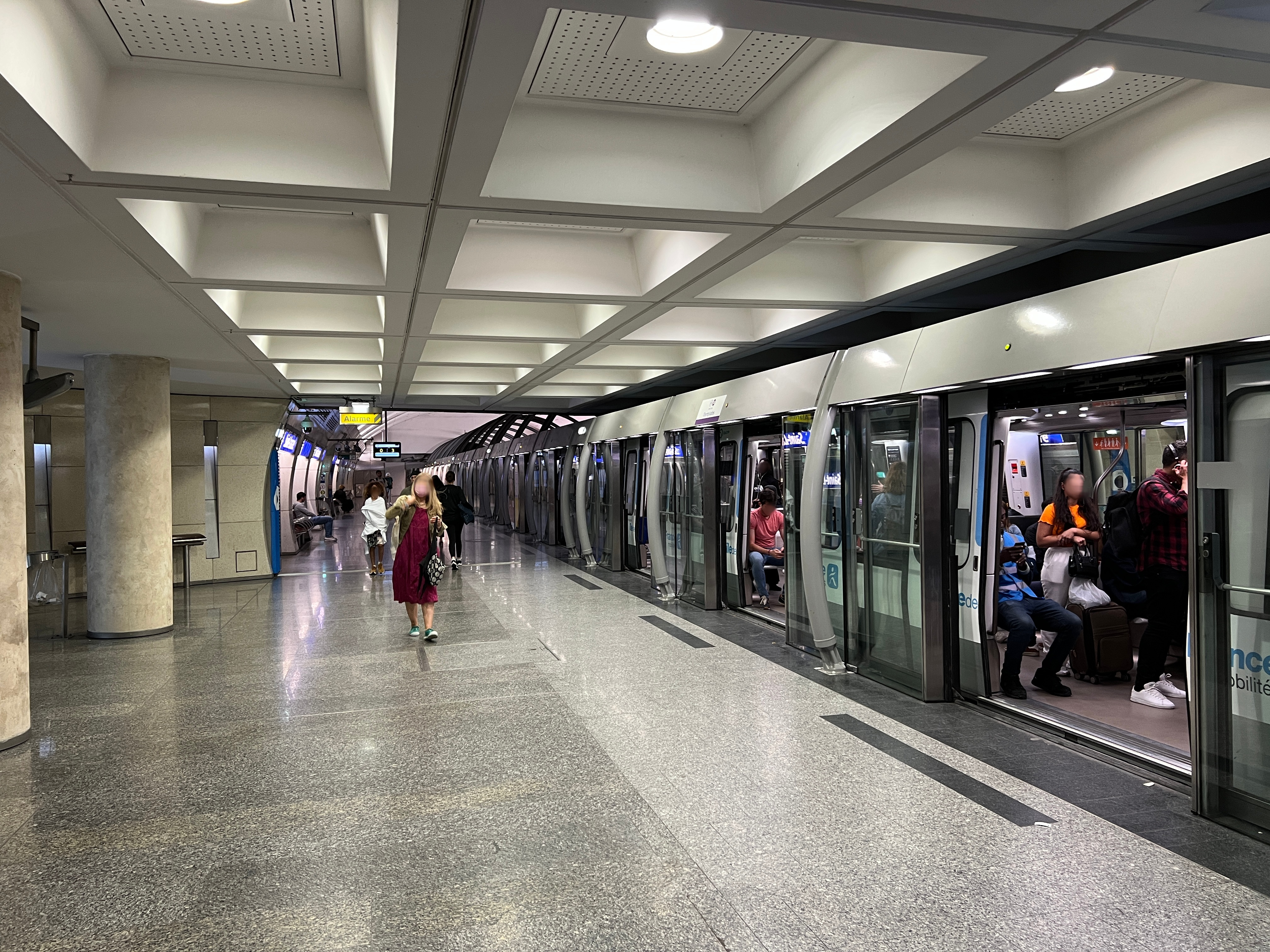
Line 14 platforms

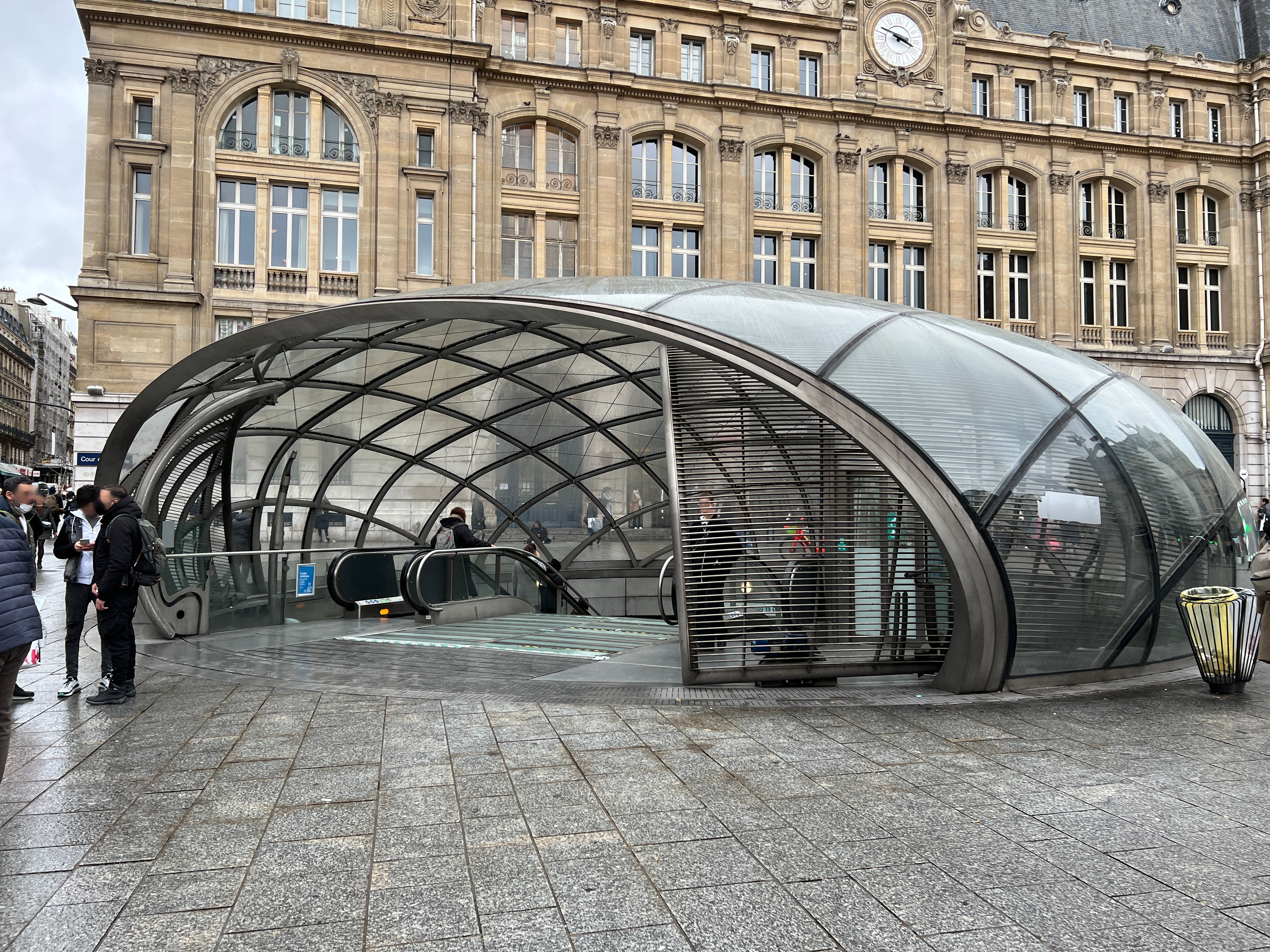
"The Lens" main entrance of the station

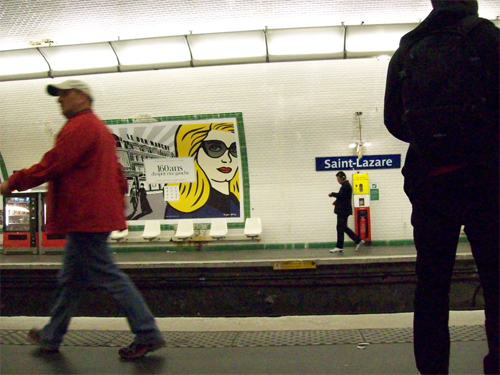
Metro users on Saint-Lazare platform
