= Musée d'art contemporain de Montréal =

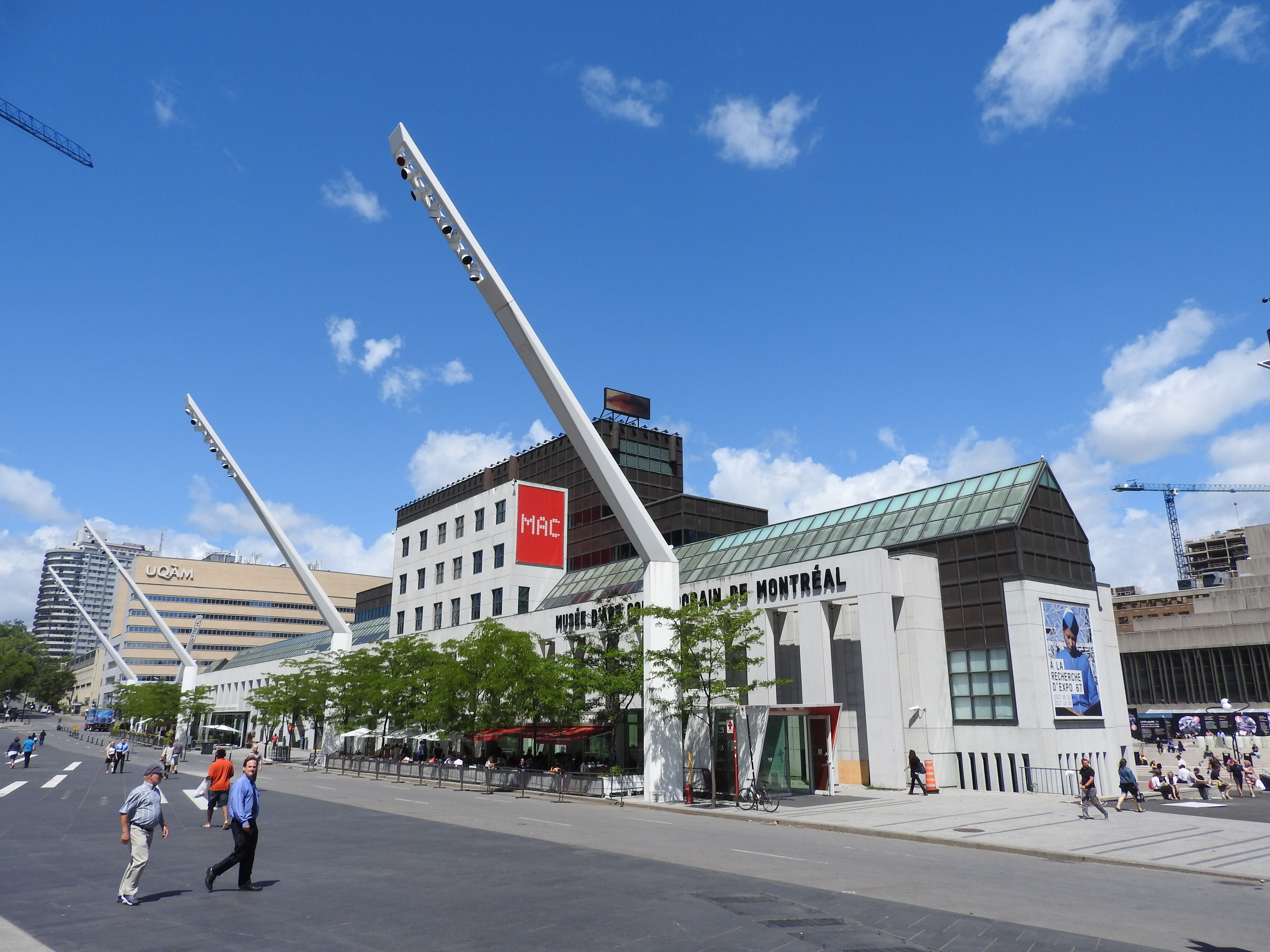
- The museum seen from Place des Festivals plaza

- Location of the museum in Montreal
- Established: 1964
- Location: 1 Place Ville Marie Ouest; Montreal, Quebec, Canada
- Coordinates: 45.5075°N 73.5661°W
- Type: Art museum
- Visitors: 241,527 (2011)
- Director: John Zeppetelli
- Public transit access: at Place-des-Arts
- Website: www.macm.org/en

The Musée d'art contemporain de Montréal (French pronunciation: [myze daʁ kɔ̃tɑ̃pɔʁɛ̃ də mɔ̃ʁeal], MACM) is a contemporary art museum in Montreal, Quebec, Canada. It is located on the Place des festivals in the Quartier des spectacles and is part of the Place des Arts complex.

Founded in 1964, it is Canada's first museum devoted to contemporary art. Initially housed in the Place Ville-Marie, the museum moved into the premises of the Château Dufresne in 1965, followed by an exhibition gallery from Expo 67 in 1968. In 1992, the museum moved to its current premises at Place des Arts in Montreal.

== History ==
The Musée d'art contemporain de Montréal was founded in 1964 by the Quebec government. The MACM was the first institution in Canada devoted exclusively to contemporary art. Before moving to its current location, the Museum was housed in three different locations: at Place Ville-Marie from 1964 to 1965, the Château Dufresne from 1965 to 1968, and at Expo 67's International Fine Arts Exhibition at the Cité du Havre Art Gallery, from 1968 to 1992. In 1983, the museum changed its status: it became an independent corporation managed by a board of directors.

In 1983, an international architectural competition was held to choose the design of the new building to house the Musée d'art contemporain de Montréal. Over one hundred firms entered the competition. Jodoin Lamarre Pratte & Associés was selected as the winning architectural firm in 1984.

On May 28, 1992, the museum opened in its new 15,100 m^{2} (163,000 sq ft) location at Place des Arts in Downtown Montreal. The museum is now part of the largest cultural complex in Canada, which combines the performing arts and visual arts. At the inauguration of its new building, close to 20,000 people visited the museum on May 29 and 30, 1992. Following the move to downtown Montreal, Quebec artist Geneviève Cadieux designed a photographic work, La Voie lactée. The work is a closeup photograph of a pair of lips, installed on the roof of the building.

In June 2017, in response to criticism that the museum was closed on itself and did not fit well in the newly established Quartier des spectacles the MACM announced a contest to redesign and extend the Place des Arts venue. In April 2018, the Saucier+Perrotte Architectes / GLCRM & Associés Architectes proposal was selected. In 2021, the museum moved into a temporary location at Place Ville-Marie for the duration of the redevelopment project.

== Collection ==
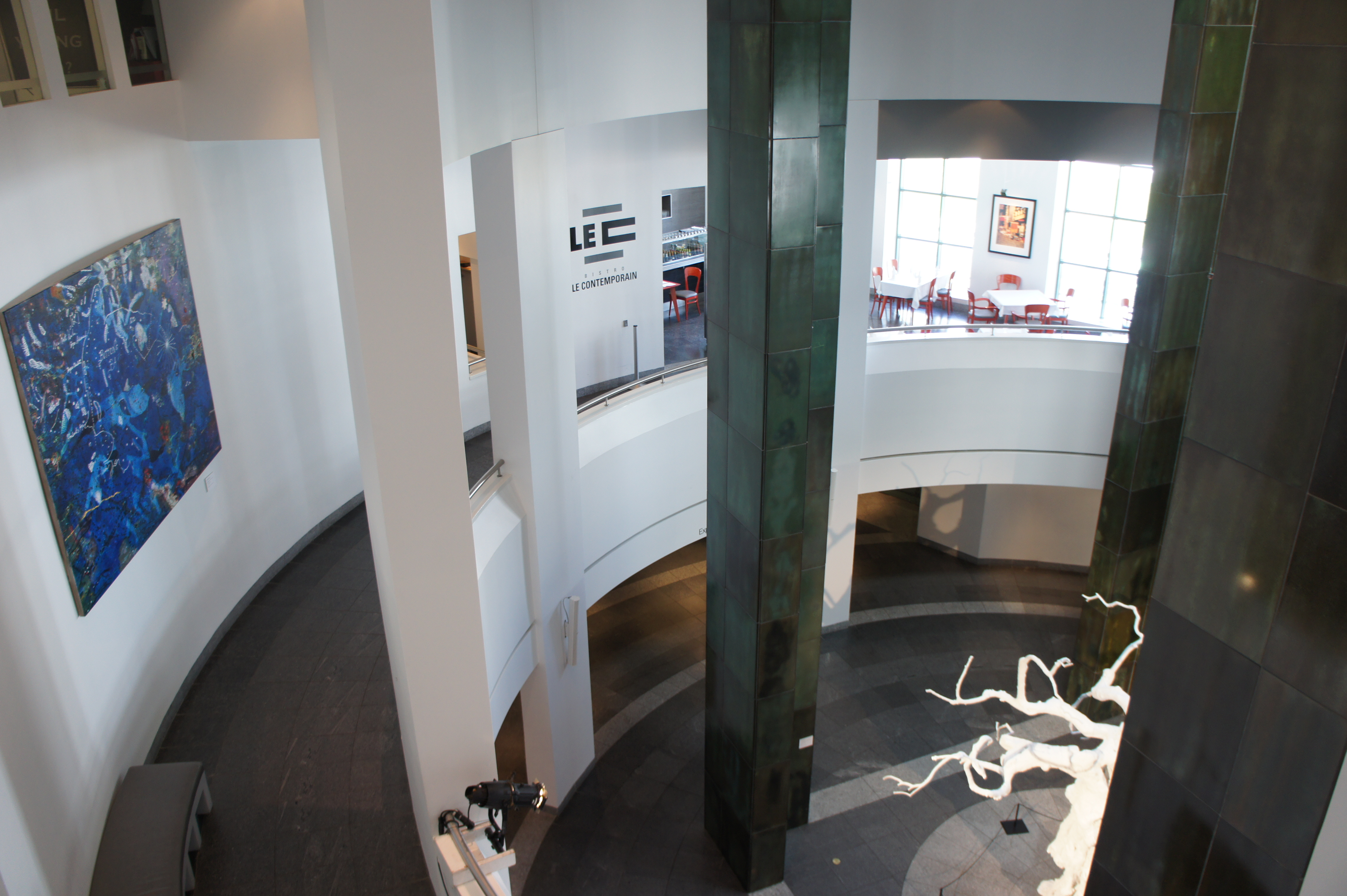
The interior of the museum in 2011.

Four rooms are reserved for exhibitions of the collection, featuring works reflecting the significant trends of contemporary art. It includes works by Quebec, Canadian and international artists. Four other rooms are dedicated to temporary exhibitions.

The collection includes over 7,000 works of art by more than 1,500 artists (1,200 still living), focusing on contemporary art from Quebec in particular and Canada in general, as well as important international artists. Its collections include contemporary paintings, sculptures, photographs, installation, video and works on paper. The museum is Canada's only cultural complex devoted to both contemporary performing and visual arts.

The museum has a significant collection of work by Montreal artist Betty Goodwin (1923-2008).

The museum was a member of the AMICO consortium.
