= Geneviève Cadieux =

Canadian photographer (born 1955)

- Born: July 17, 1955 (age 71); Montreal, Quebec, Canada
- Education: BA in Visual Arts from University of Ottawa
- Known for: photographer who frequently makes large-scale public installations

Geneviève Cadieux CM RCA FRSC (French pronunciation: [ʒənvjɛv kadjø]; born 17 July 1955) is a Canadian artist known for her large-scale photographic and media works in urban settings. She lives in Montreal.

== Education ==
Cadieux was born in Montreal, Quebec, in 1955. She received her BA in Visual Arts from University of Ottawa.

== Teaching ==
- Concordia University, 1991 – present;
- Guest professor, École nationale supérieure des Beaux-Arts in Paris, 1994;
- École nationale des beaux-arts in Grenoble, 1996

== Works ==
Geneviève Cadieux is a photographer who frequently works with audio-visual materials in her large-scale public installations in urban settings. Cadieux's work confronts identity, gender, and the body. She presents the body as a landscape, focusing on small details close-up, such as mouths, bruises, and scars.

Cadieux's early career was mainly in film photography. Her 1989 work, Hear Me With Your Eyes, was featured at the Morris and Helen Belkin Art Gallery and consisted of large-scale photographic prints of a woman displaying sexually evocative facial expressions.

Over time, Cadieux's work has shifted to integrating video and audio content, such as her Broken Memory. The piece employed glass sculpture representative of the human body and a recorded reading of a 17th-century poem by Sister Juana Inés de la Cruz.

A notable video work by Cadieux was included as the inaugural piece of the 2002 The 59th Minute: Video Art on the Times Square Astrovision, an undertaking by Creative Time and Panasonic wherein the 59th minute of each hour of the day saw an artistic image in place of regular programming. Cadieux's Portrait celebrated the regeneration and renewal of spring, featuring footage of a solitary tree, a lonely survivor of the 1998 ice storm in Montreal.

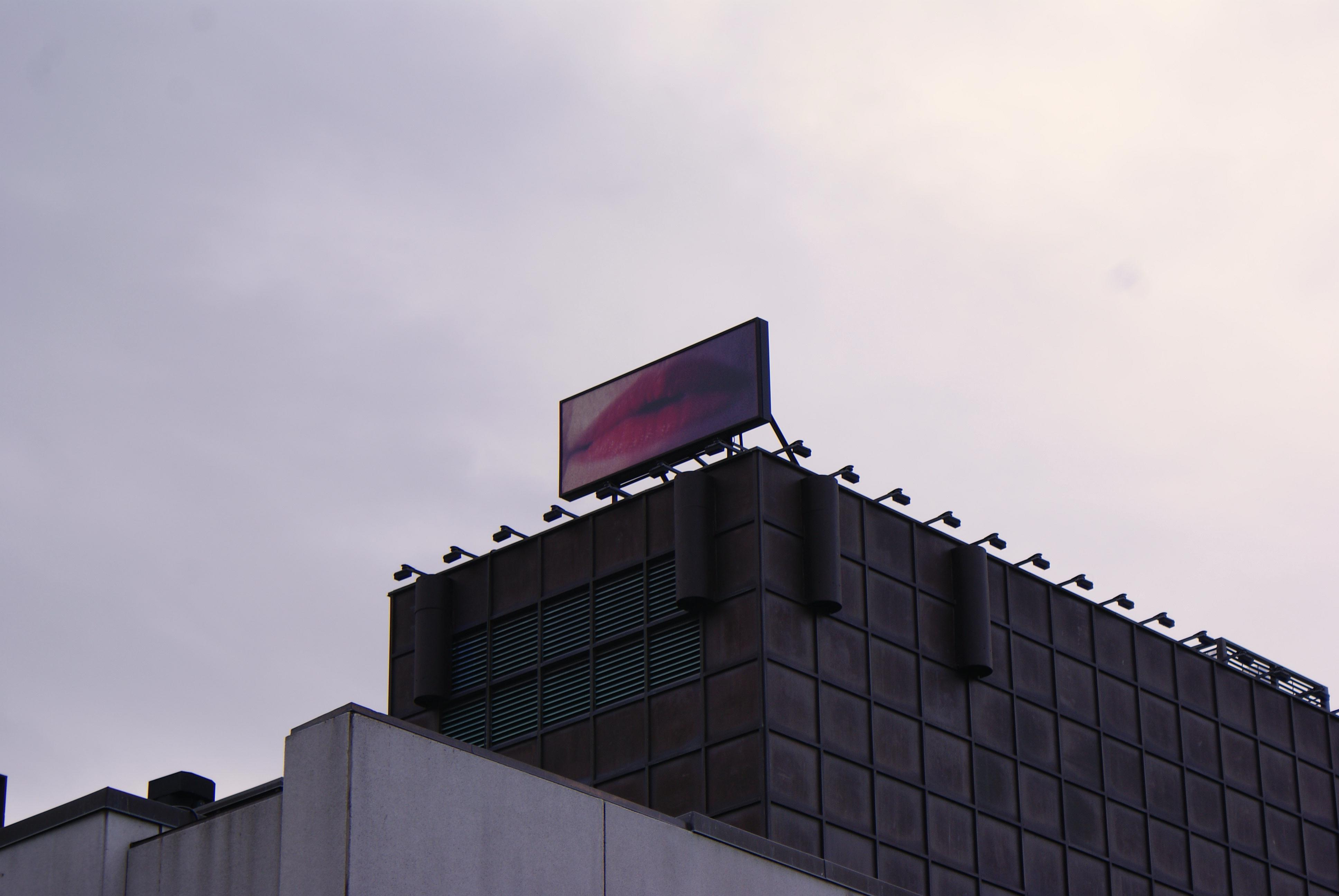
La Voie lactée, 1992

One of Cadieux's most prominent works is her 1992 piece La Voie lactée, a photograph of a woman's red lips displayed on the rooftop of the Musée d'art contemporain de Montréal. It has since become an icon of Montréal. In 2011, a sister piece, La Voix lactée, was commissioned by the Société de transport de Montréal as a gift for the Paris Metro, in exchange for the Hector Guimard Parisian metro entrance at Square-Victoria-OACI station. Based on the theme of the French language binding France and Quebec, it features a mosaic reproduction of La Voie lactée, accompanied by a poem by Anne Hébert. It was installed at Saint-Lazare station.

In 2019, her work FLOW/FLOTS was unveiled at Rideau station of the O-Train, Ottawa.

== Exhibitions ==
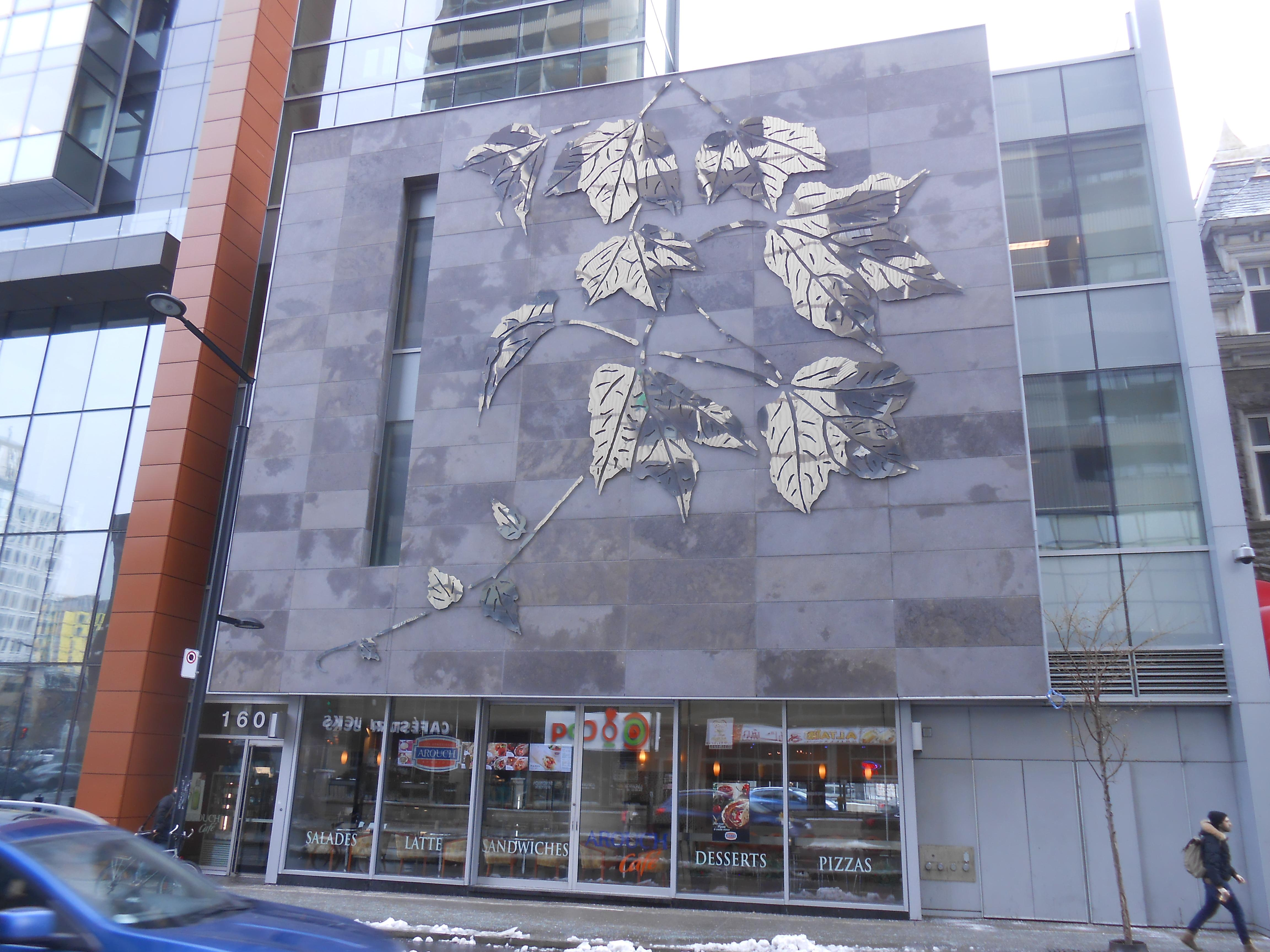
Lierre sur pierre, 2009

- Musée départemental d'art contemporain, Rochechouart, France
- Museum Van Hadendaagse Kunst, Antwerp, Belgium
- The Montreal Biennial, Canada, 1985, 1986, 2000
- The São Paulo Biennial, Brazil, 1987
- The Sydney Biennial, Australia, 1987 and 1990
- The Venice Biennial, Italy, 1990
- Musée d'art contemporain de Montréal, 1993
- Tate Gallery, London, 1995
- Pittsburgh Center for the Arts, Pittsburgh, PA, United States, 1996
- Miami Art Museum, Miami, Florida, 1998
- Montreal Museum of Fine Arts, 2000
- The 59th Minute: Video Art on the Times Square Astrovision, New York, 2002
- Geneviève Cadieux, Barcelone, 2003–21, National Gallery of Canada, 2021

== Awards ==
- 1994 Victor Martyn Lynch-Staunton Award from the Canada Council.
- Royal Canadian Academy of Arts
- 2011 Governor General's Awards in Visual and Media Arts.
- 2014 Fellow of the Royal Society of Canada.
- 2018 Prix Paul-Émile-Borduas
