= Claude Bettinger =

- Born: 1942; Lyon, France
- Died: 1998 (aged 55–56); Quebec, Canada
- Known for: sculptor, stained glass artist, educator

Claude Bettinger RCA was a sculptor and stained glass artist. Born in Lyon in 1942, he died in Quebec in 1998.

== Biographical notes ==
- He grew up in Alsace.
- He arrived in Quebec in 1952.
- In 1963, he graduated from the École des Beaux-Arts de Montréal.
- He pursued further studies at the Louvre.
- He taught at the École des Beaux-Arts de Montréal from 1967 to 1968.
- He taught at the Université du Québec à Trois-Rivières from 1971 to 1973.

== Famous works ==
Several of Claude Bettinger's works occupy prominent public spaces in Montreal and Quebec:

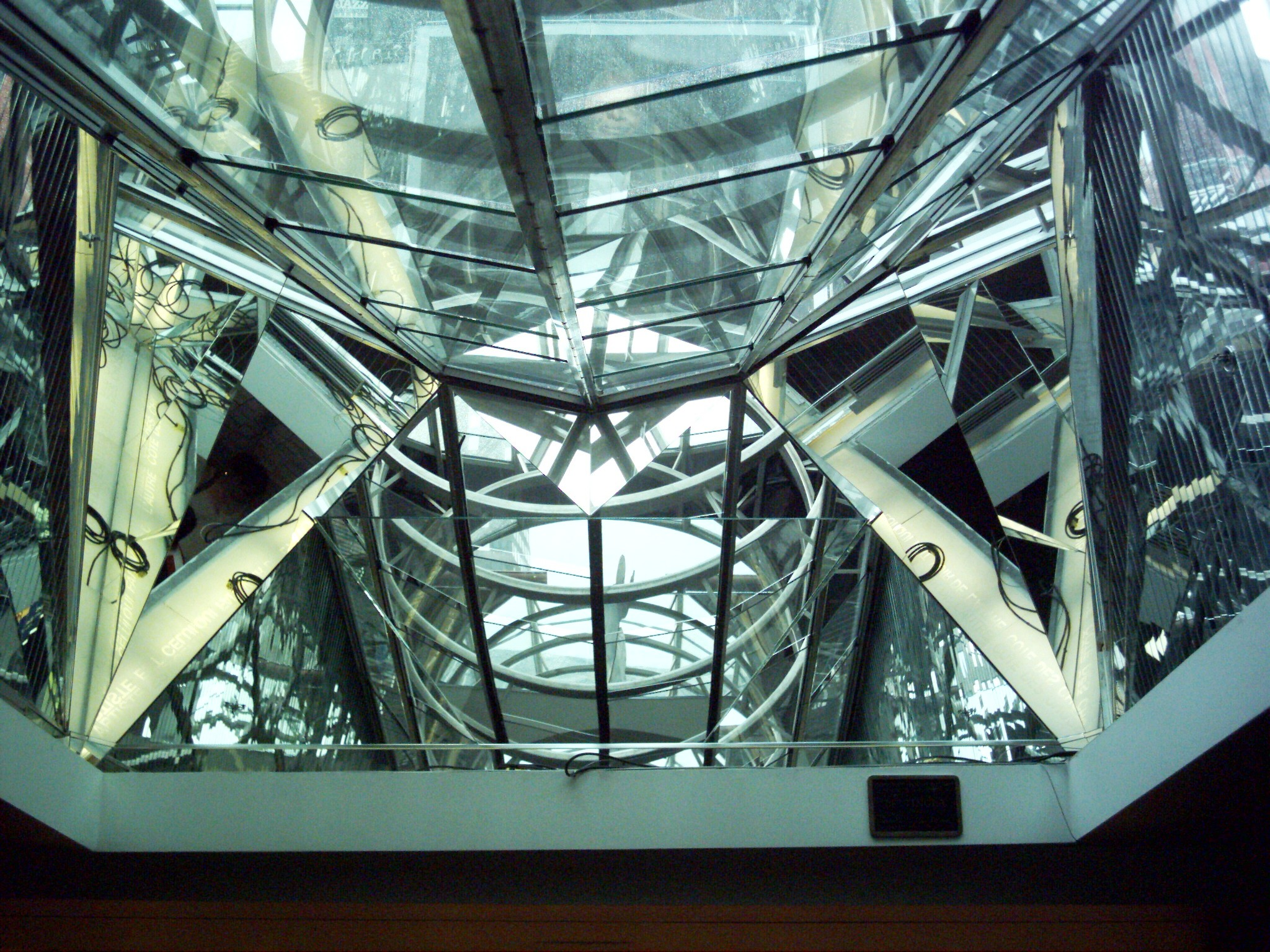
Claude Bettinger's L'artiste est celui qui fait voir l'autre côté des choses (1992) Place des Arts, Montreal, Quebec

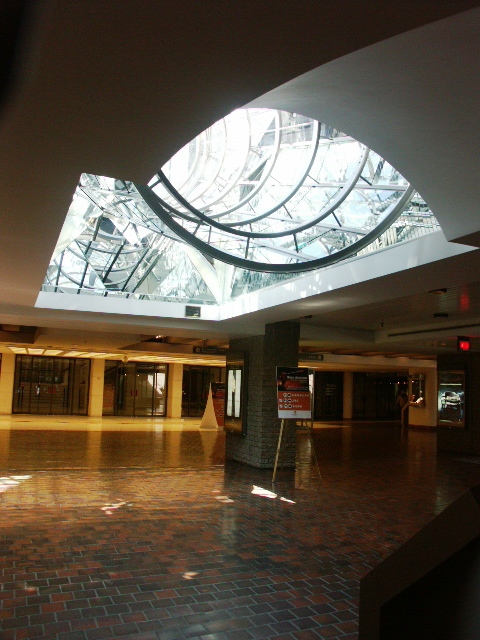
Claude Bettinger's L'artiste est celui qui fait voir l'autre côté des choses (1992) Place des Arts, Montreal, Quebec
- In the Montreal Metro, two stained glass installations at Côtes-des-Neiges Metro Station
- Numerous stained glass works in chapels, churches and buildings throughout the Province of Quebec

== Honours ==
- Royal Canadian Academy of Arts
