= Rashi Synagogue (Paris) =

Synagogue in Paris, France

- Synagogue Rashi
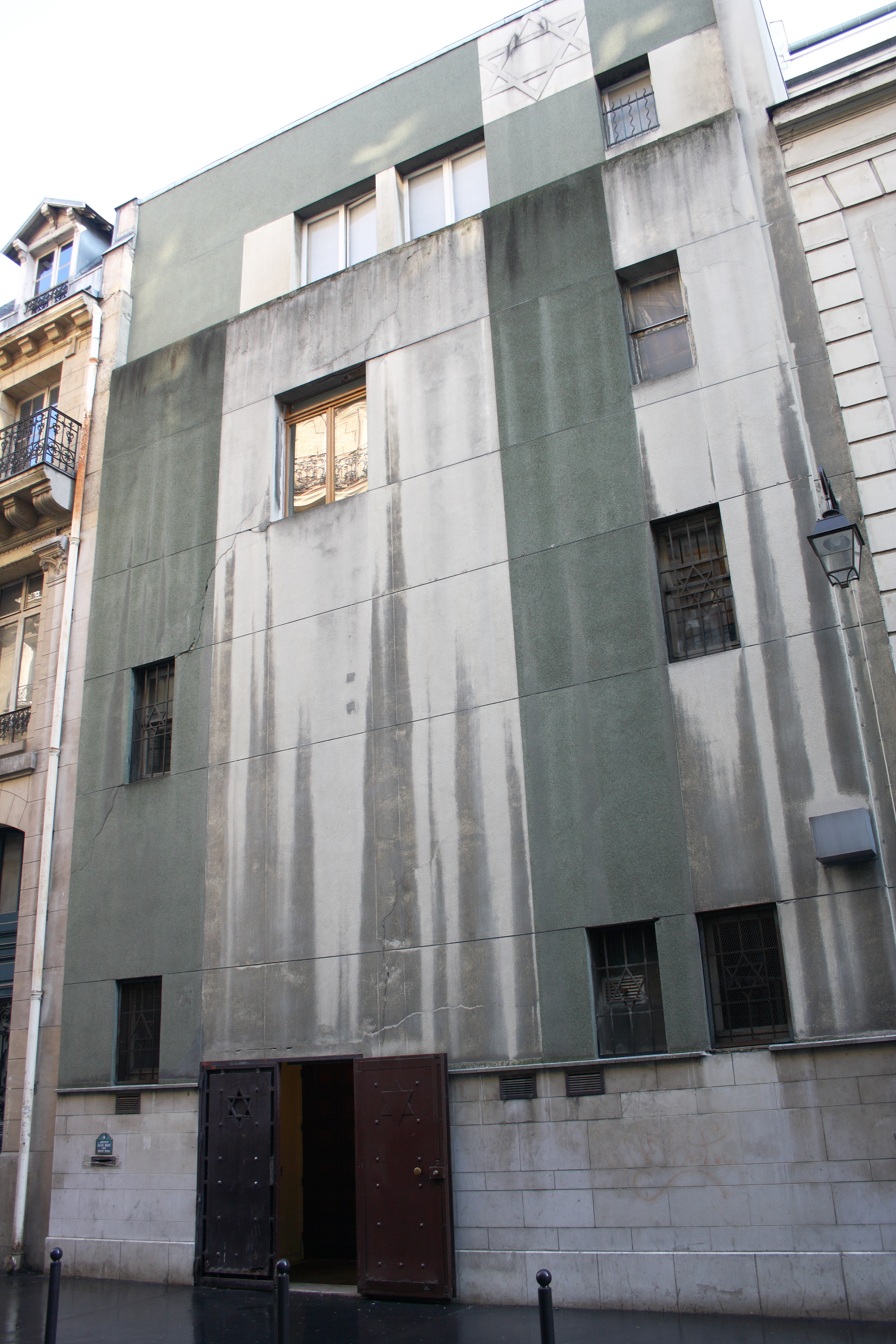

Religion
- Affiliation: Orthodox Judaism

Location
- Location: 6 Rue Ambroise-Thomas, 9th arrondissement, Paris, France
- Interactive map of Rashi Synagogue
- Coordinates: 48.874499°N 2.347404°E

The Rashi Synagogue (French: Synagogue Rashi), also known as Rashi Shul, is located at 6 rue Ambroise-Thomas, and is one of the non-consistorial Orthodox synagogues in the 9th arrondissement of Paris.

== History ==
Bernard Mathias, the son of the former secretary of the synagogue, wrote a book, The Caretakers of God, recounting his father's life in and around the synagogue.
