= Saint-Louis-d'Antin =

Church located in Paris, in France

Coordinates: 48°52′28″N 2°19′41″E

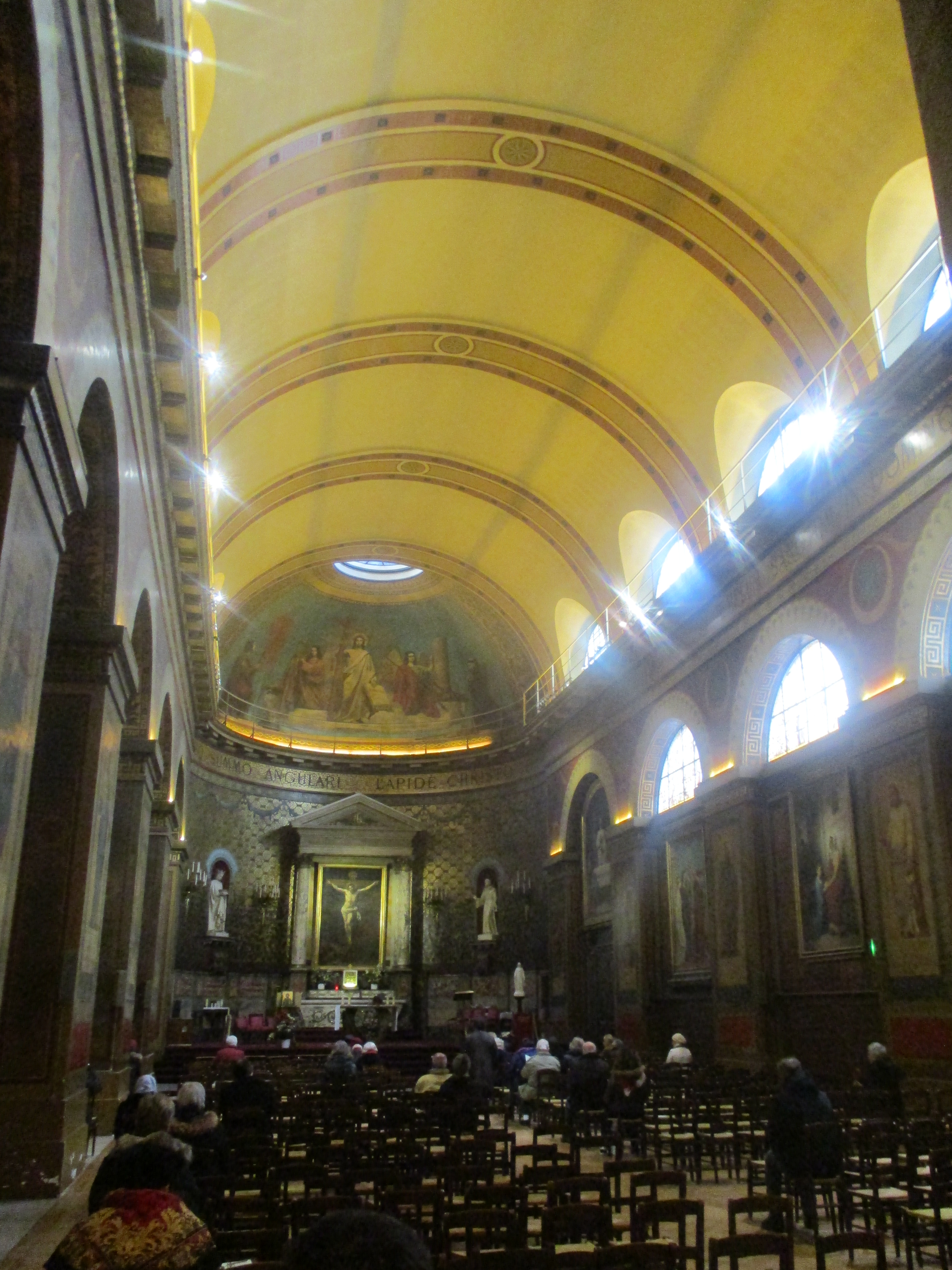
- Saint-Louis-d'Antin

Religion
- Affiliation: Catholic Church
- Province: Archdiocese of Paris heritage_designation = 1972
- Rite: Roman Rite

Location
- Location: 63 rue Caumartin, 9th arrondissement of Paris,
- Interactive map of Saint-Louis-d'Antin

Architecture
- Architect: Pierre Bullet
- Style: Neo-Classical
- Groundbreaking: 1780
- Completed: 1782

Website
- website of the church (in French)]

Saint-Louis-d'Antin is a Roman Catholic parish church located at 63 rue Caumartin in the 9th arrondissement of Paris, next to Place Georges-Berry, close to the major Paris department stores Printemps and Galeries Lafayette, and the Gare Saint-Lazare railway station. It was originally built in 1783 as a monastery chapel, then became a parish church in 1802. It is known for its lavish Neclassical interior and its collection of 19th century paintings and stained glass.

== History ==
The site of the church was originally selected by King Louis XVI in 1779. He proposed moving the monastery for novice Capucine monks, a branch of the Franciscans from the neighbourhood of Saint-Jacques to the newer neighbourhood of the Chaussee D'Antin, which had no churches or other religious institutions. The chapel and other monastery buildings were constructed between 1780 and 1782 by the architect Alexandre-Théodore Brongniart (1739-1813). who was one of the major figures in French neoclassical architecture during the period. His other works included the Paris Bourse, or stock market, and Père Lachaise Cemetery, where he is buried.

Following the French Revolution in 1789, the chapel was closed and turned into a printer's workshop. It was returned to the Catholic Church in 1795, and became a parish church in 1802. The other buildings of the monastery were transformed into a high school, known today as the Lycee Condorcet, whose students included Claude Levi Strauss and Marcel Proust.

On 22 July 1834, Polish national Romantic poet Adam Mickiewicz married Celina Szymanowska (daughter of famous pianist, Maria Szymanowska) in the church.

The church is named for King Louis IX, or Saint Louis, for his role in promoting Christianity in France and in the Holy Land during the Crusades.

== Exterior ==
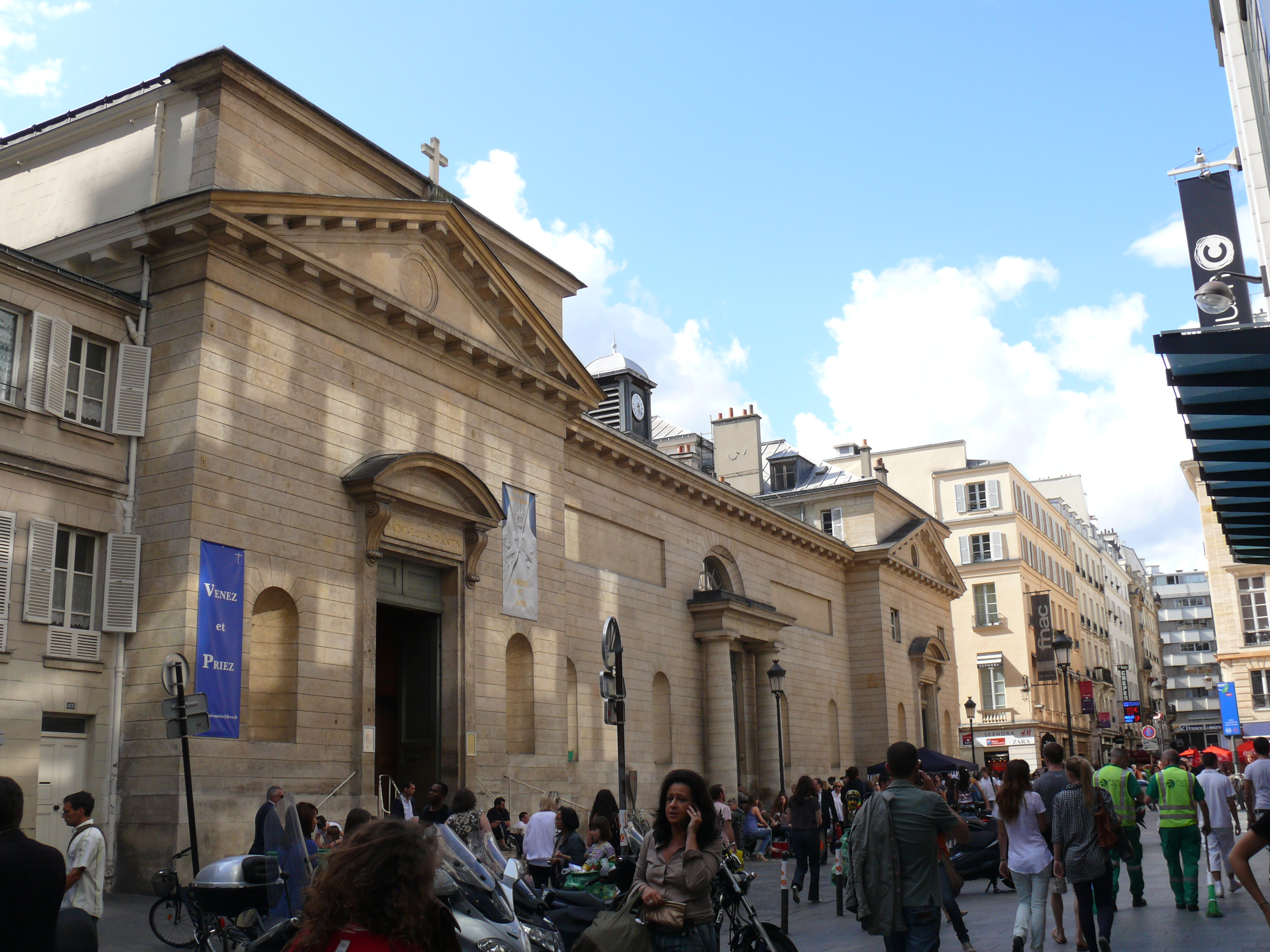
The facade on rue Caumartin (1783)

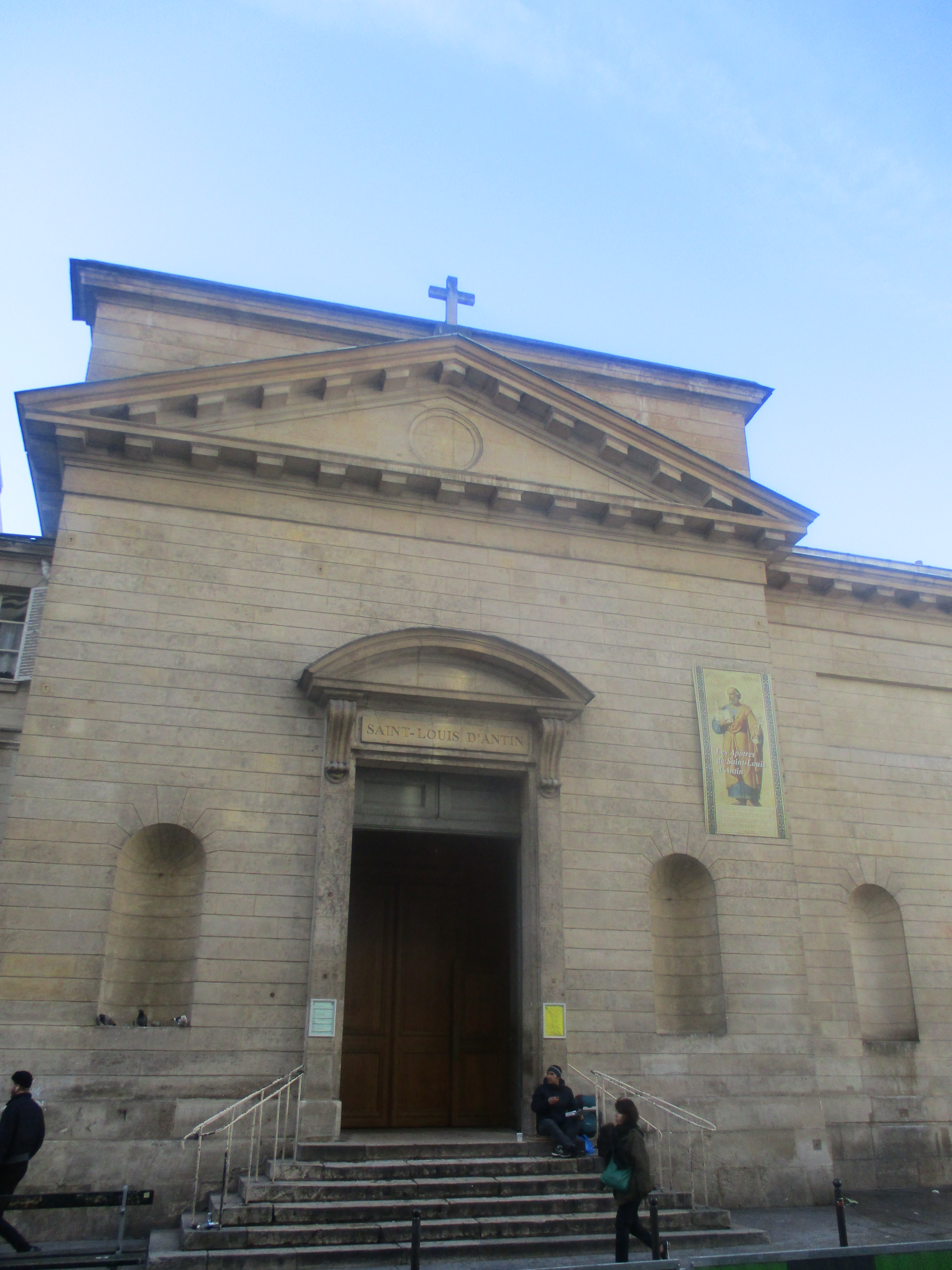
The neoclassical Portal

The facade of the church, completed in 1783, the original entry to the monastery chapel, is extremely plain, with an undecorated fronton and a portal opening directly onto the street. It is close to other buildings that formerly were part of the monastery, including the building of the Lycée Condorcet, founded in 1803, one of the oldest and most prestigious high schools in Paris.

== Interior ==
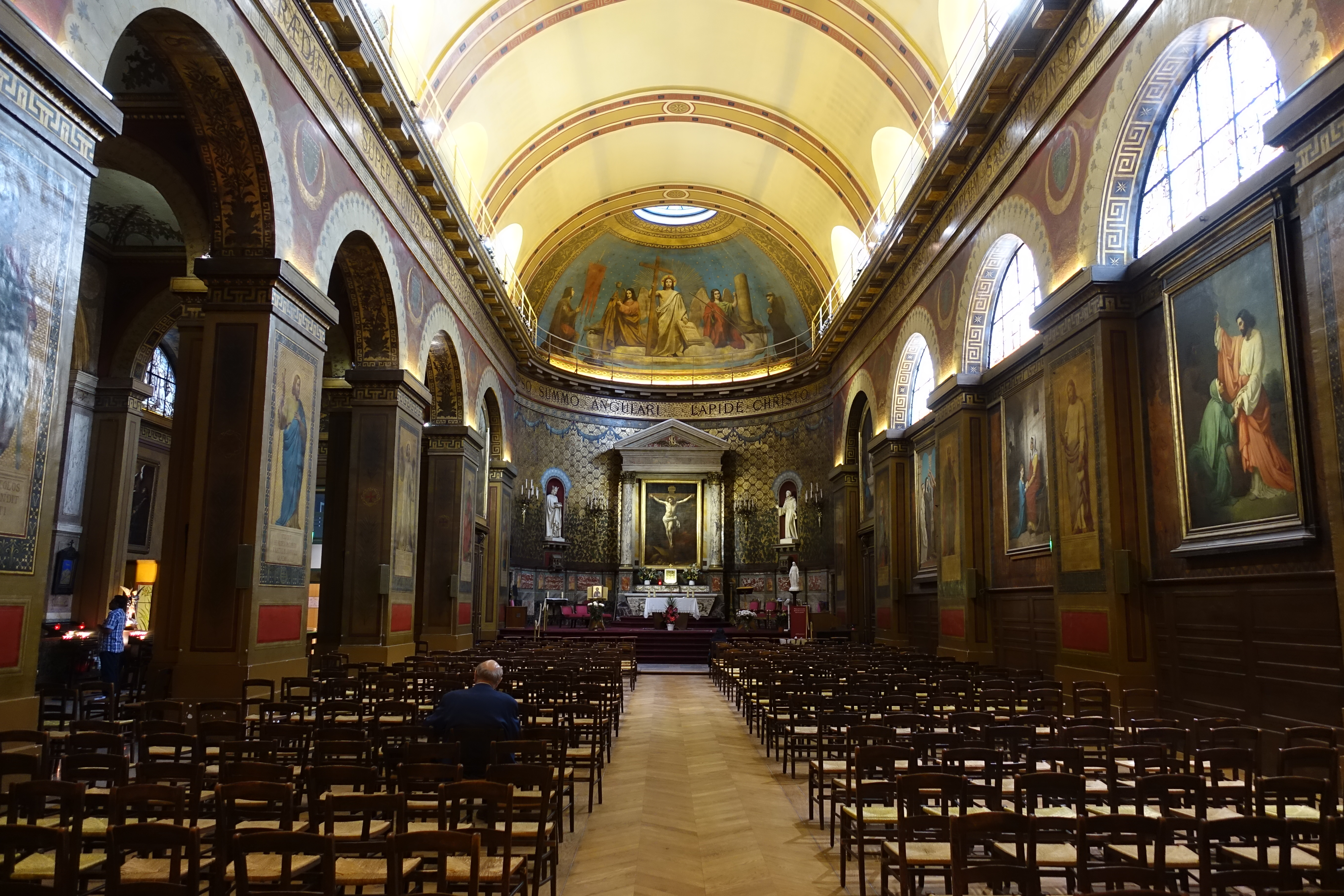
The nave, facing the choir

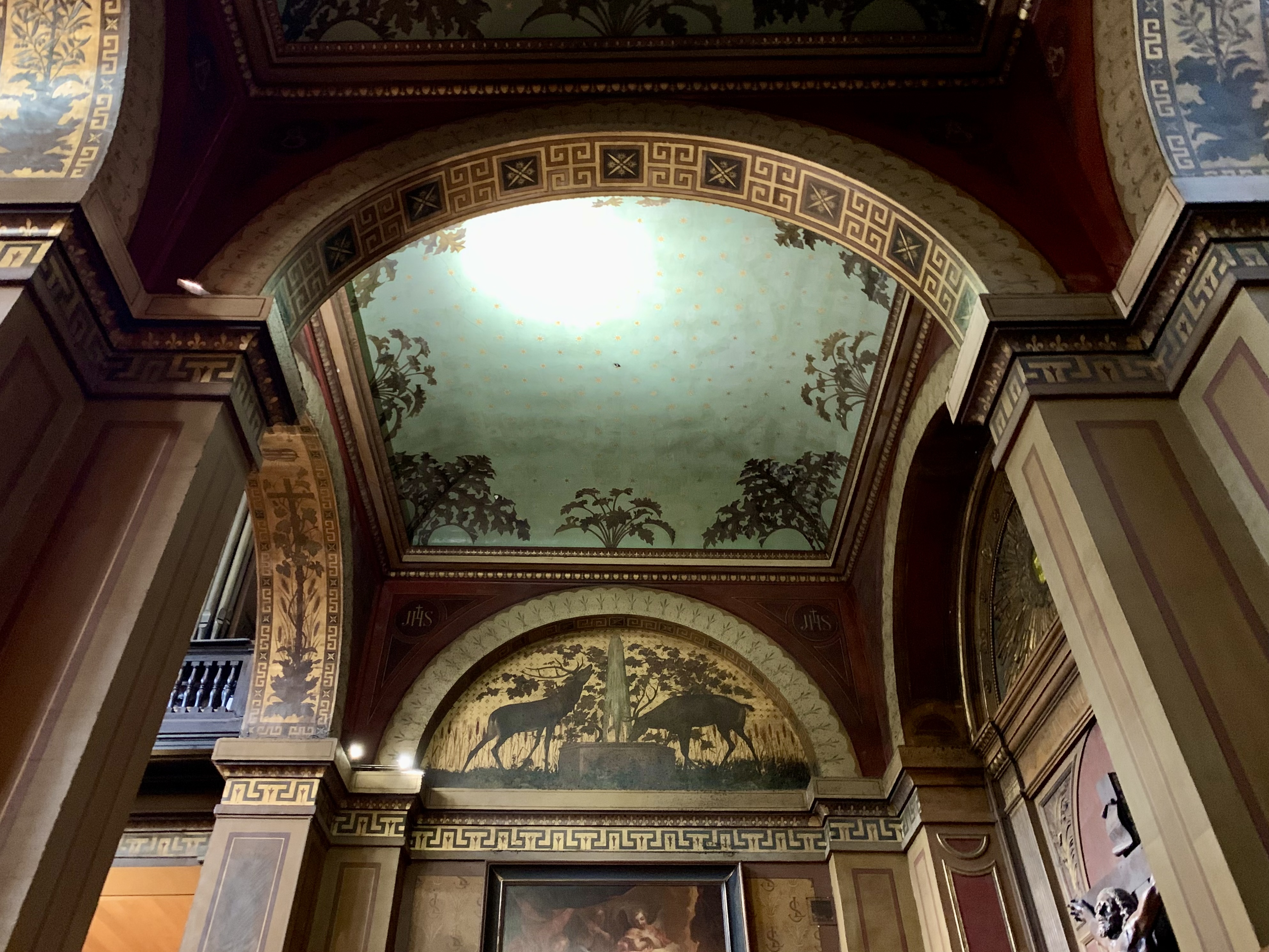
Classical decoration of the ceiling of the collateral aisle

The interior is a good example of the neoclassicism or Louis XVI style which was popular in France toward the end of the 18th century. The Paris Pantheon was a contemporary example. The interiors were also inspired by the recent discoveries of Roman interiors with murals at Pompeii in Italy. Murals, paintings and classical sculpture in niches decorate the interior of the church.

=== The Choir ===
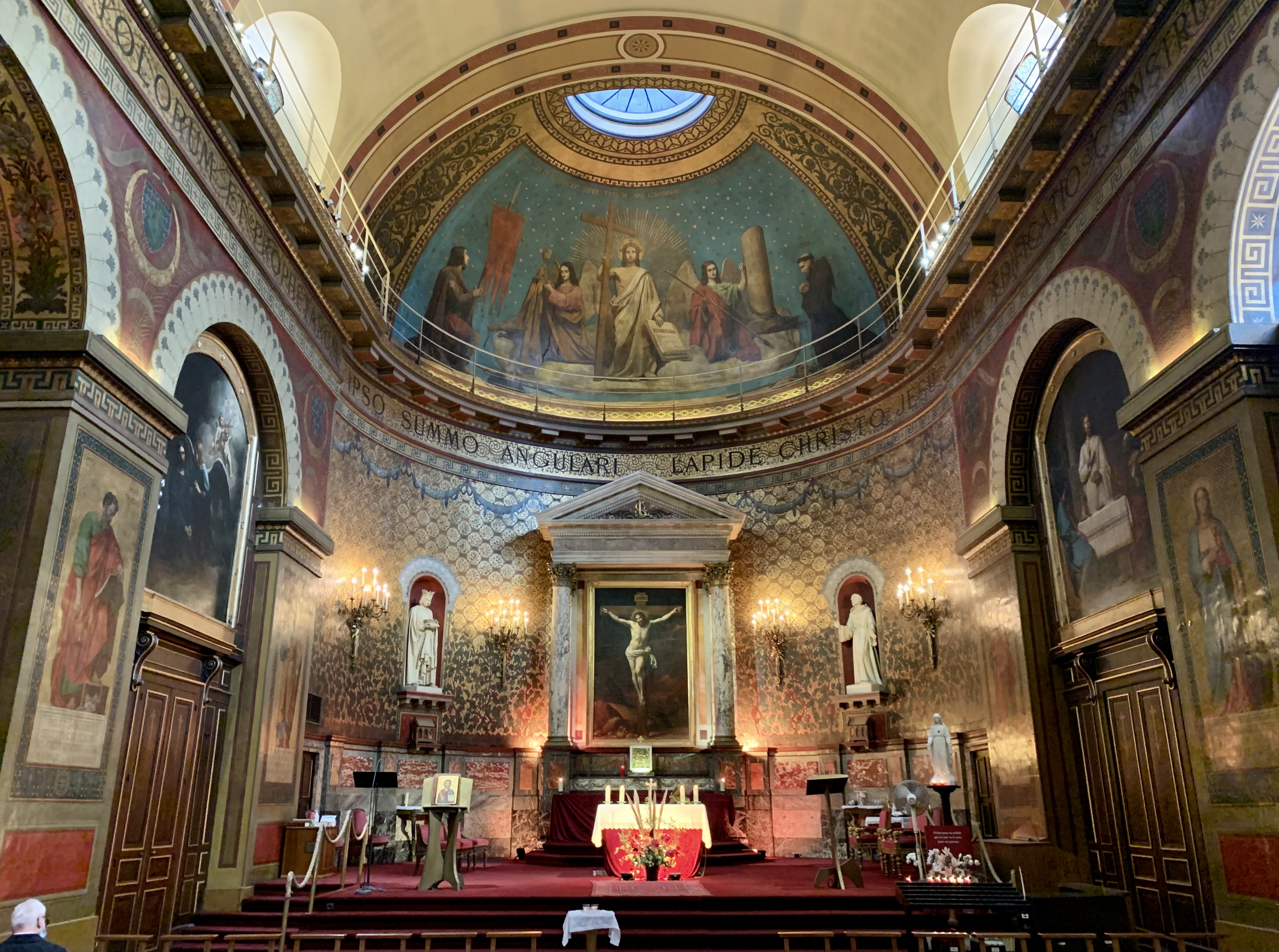
The Choir

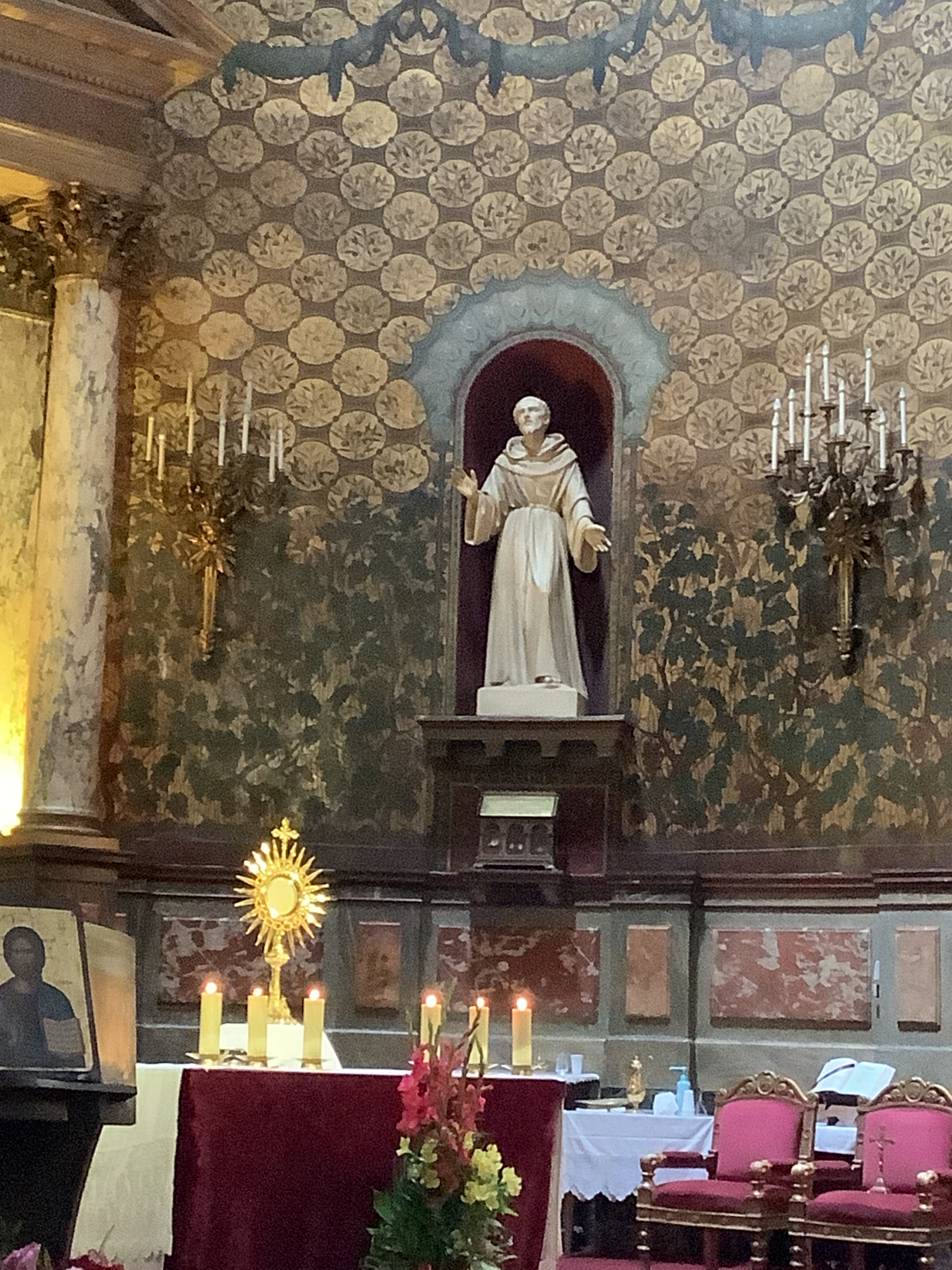
Sculpture of Saint Francis of Assisi in the Choir

The choir is topped by a cupola with a skylight and decorated on the inside with a 19th-century fresco which portrays "Saint Louis and Saint Francis adoring the Resurrected Christ." The fresco, in a neo-Byzantine style, was created by Emil Signol (1804-1892).

The centerpiece of the choir, beneath a classical pediment, is a large painting of Christ on the cross, flanked on either side by statues in niches. The sculpture on the left is "Saint Louis bringing the Crown of Thorns to France", and that to the right is Saint Francis of Assisi. the founder The Franciscan order. The two statues are by Etienne Montagny (1816-1895).The walls of the choir are lavishly decorated in a style inspired by ancient Roman monuments of Pompei

=== Nave and chapels ===
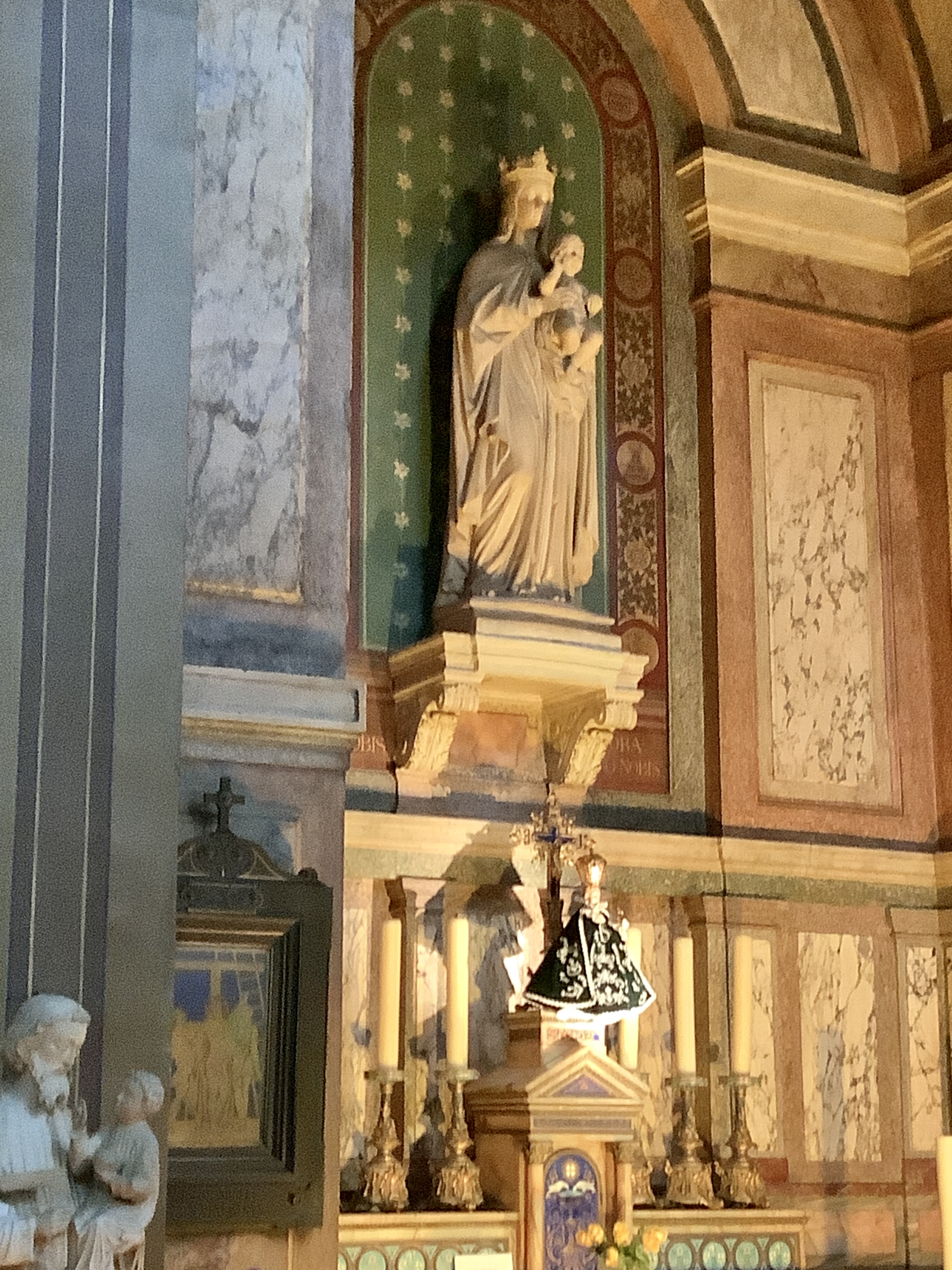
Chapel of the Virgin, with statue by Raymond Gayard (1777-1858)

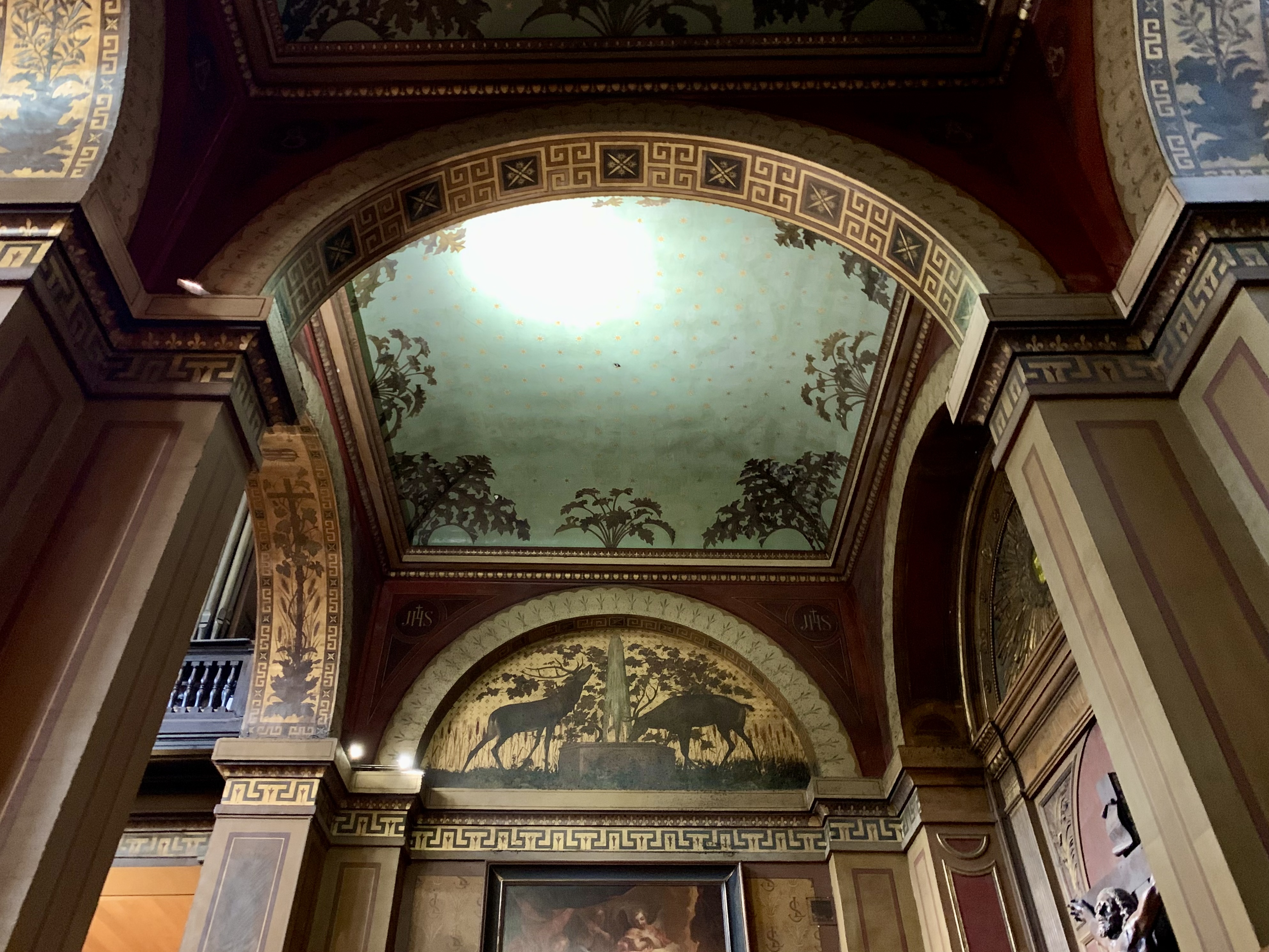
Classical decoration of the ceiling of the collateral aisle

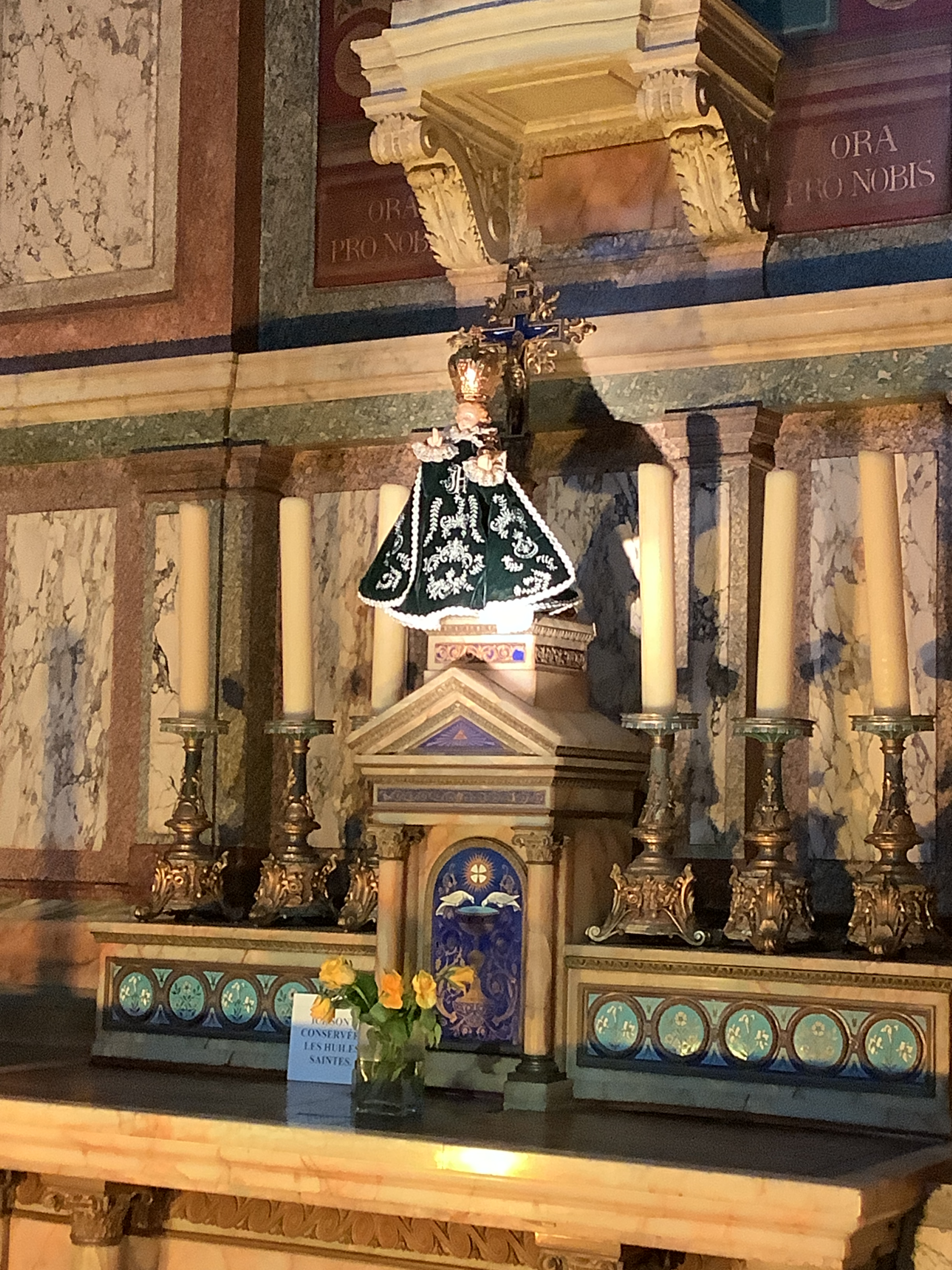
Detail of the altar of the Chapel of the Virgin, made of onyx encrusted with copper and enamel

The walls on the right side of the nave are divided into sections by classical pilasters, with semi-circular stained glass windows on the upper level and alternating murals and framed paintings by prominent 19th-century French artists on the lower level.

The interior has only a single collateral aisle, on the left side of the nave, separated from the nave by an arcade of pillars and rounded arches. The collateral aisle has a series of chapels.

The Chapel of the Virgin is particularly lavish, with walls ornamented with marble and stucco. The chapel altar is also notable, made of onyx, encrusted with enamel and copper. The sculpture of the Virgin is by Raymond Gayard (1777-1858).

The collateral aisle was decorated with painted ceilings and walls with floral, vegetal and geometric designs inspired by classical Roman art.

== Art and decoration ==
=== Paintings ===
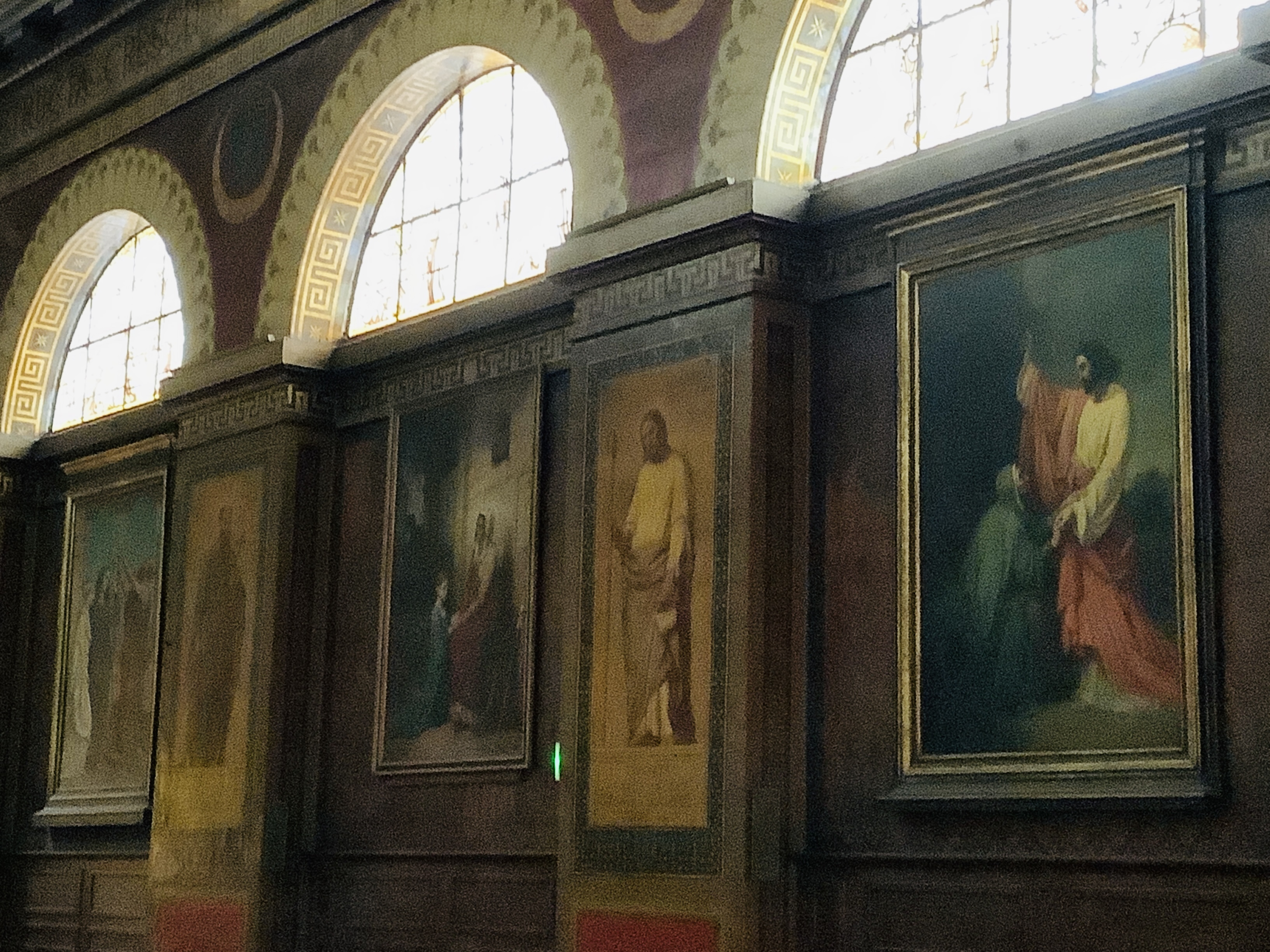
The alternating frescoes and paintings in the nave

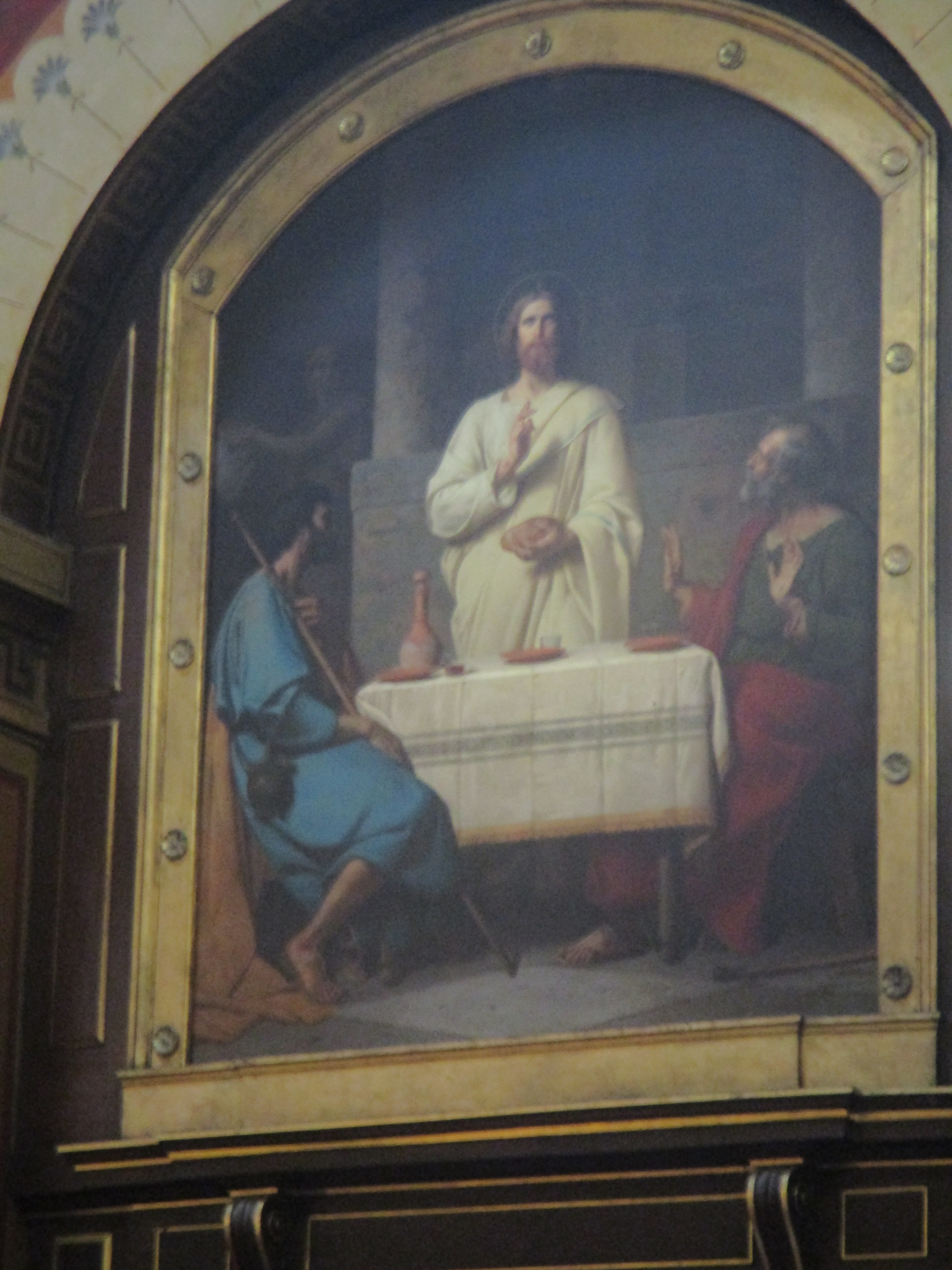
Nave painting

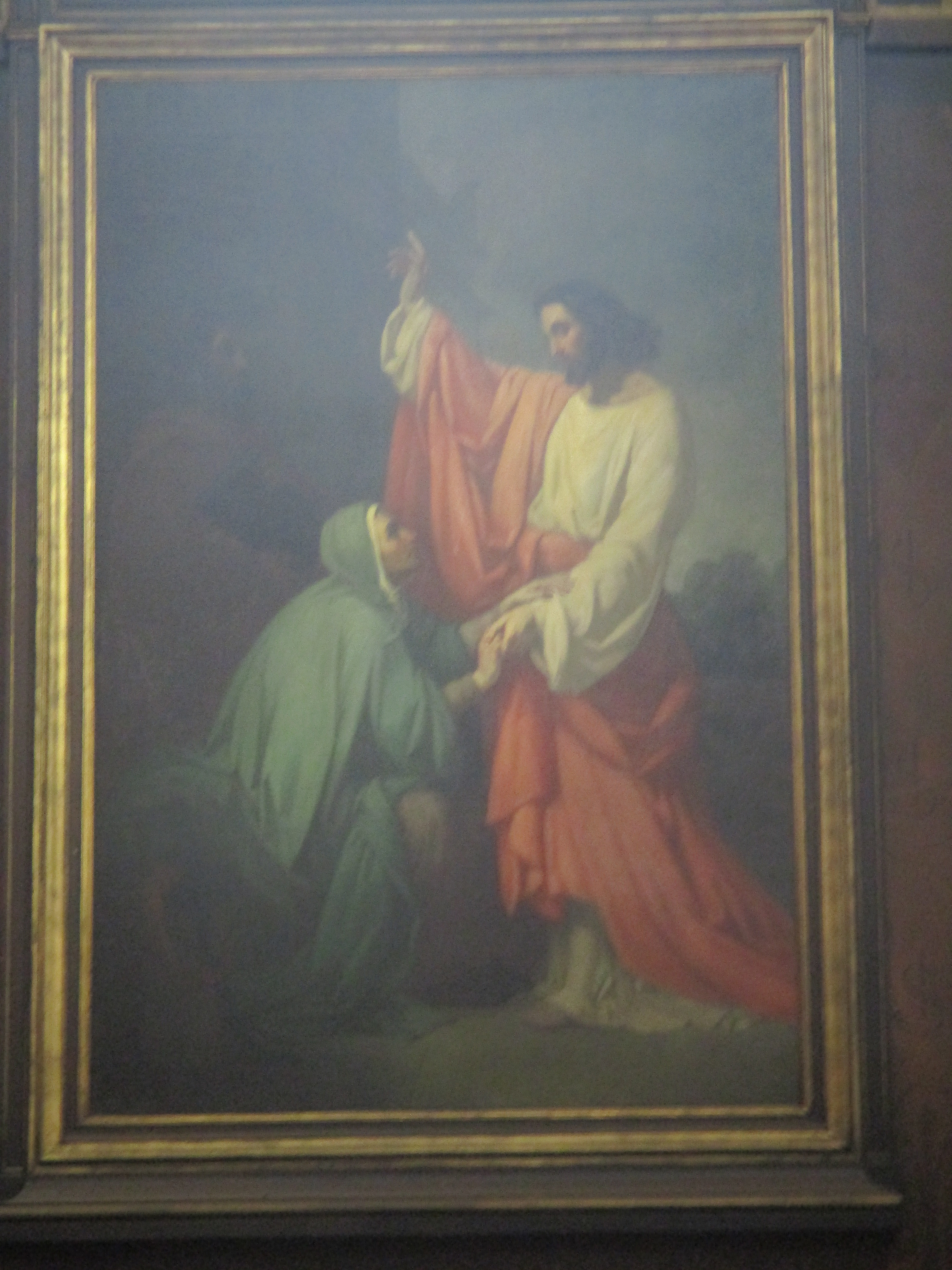
Nave painting

=== Stained glass ===
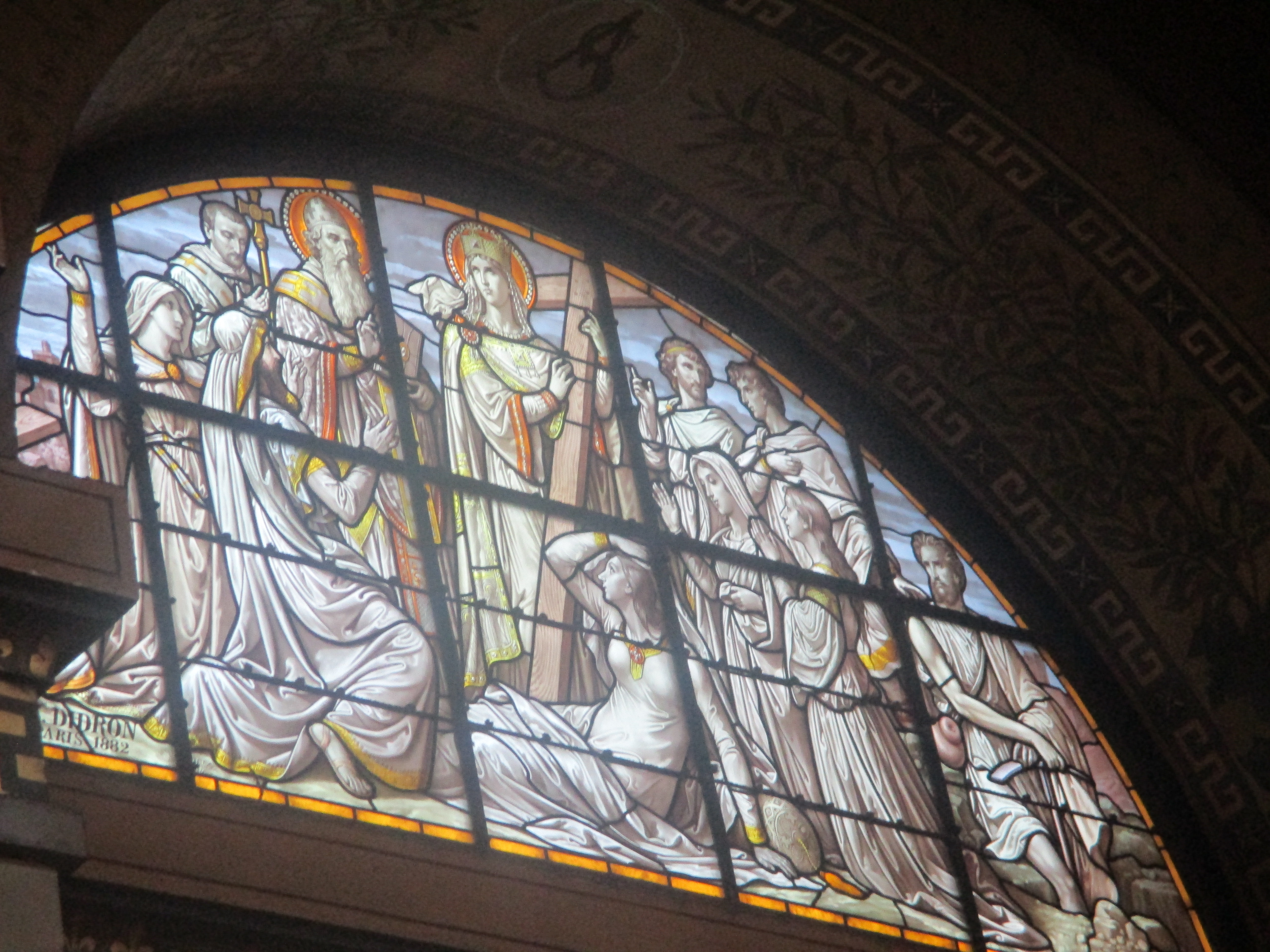
"The Cardinal Virtues - Temperance";

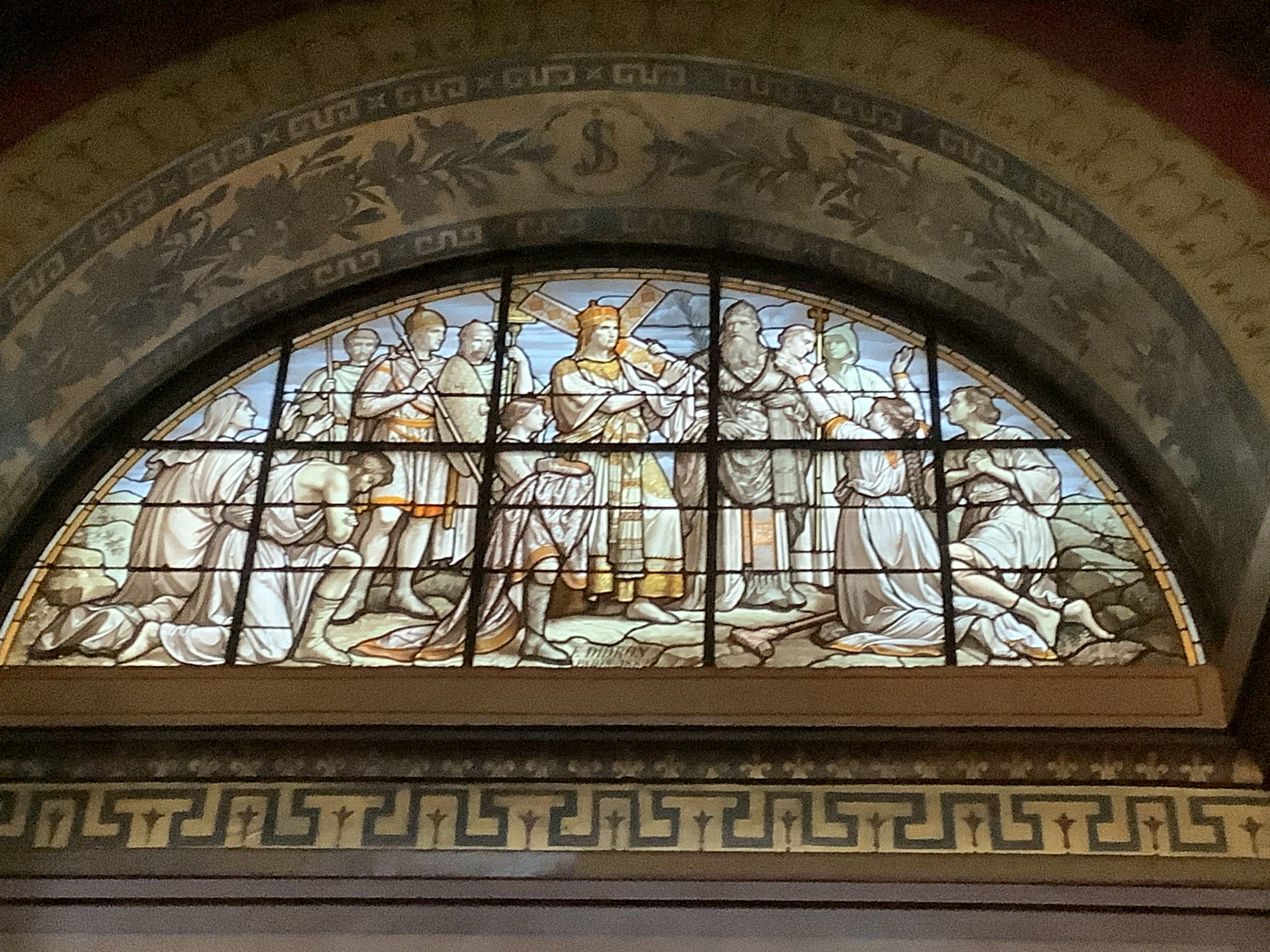
"Cardinal virtues - Faith" by Edouard-Amédée Didron (1882)

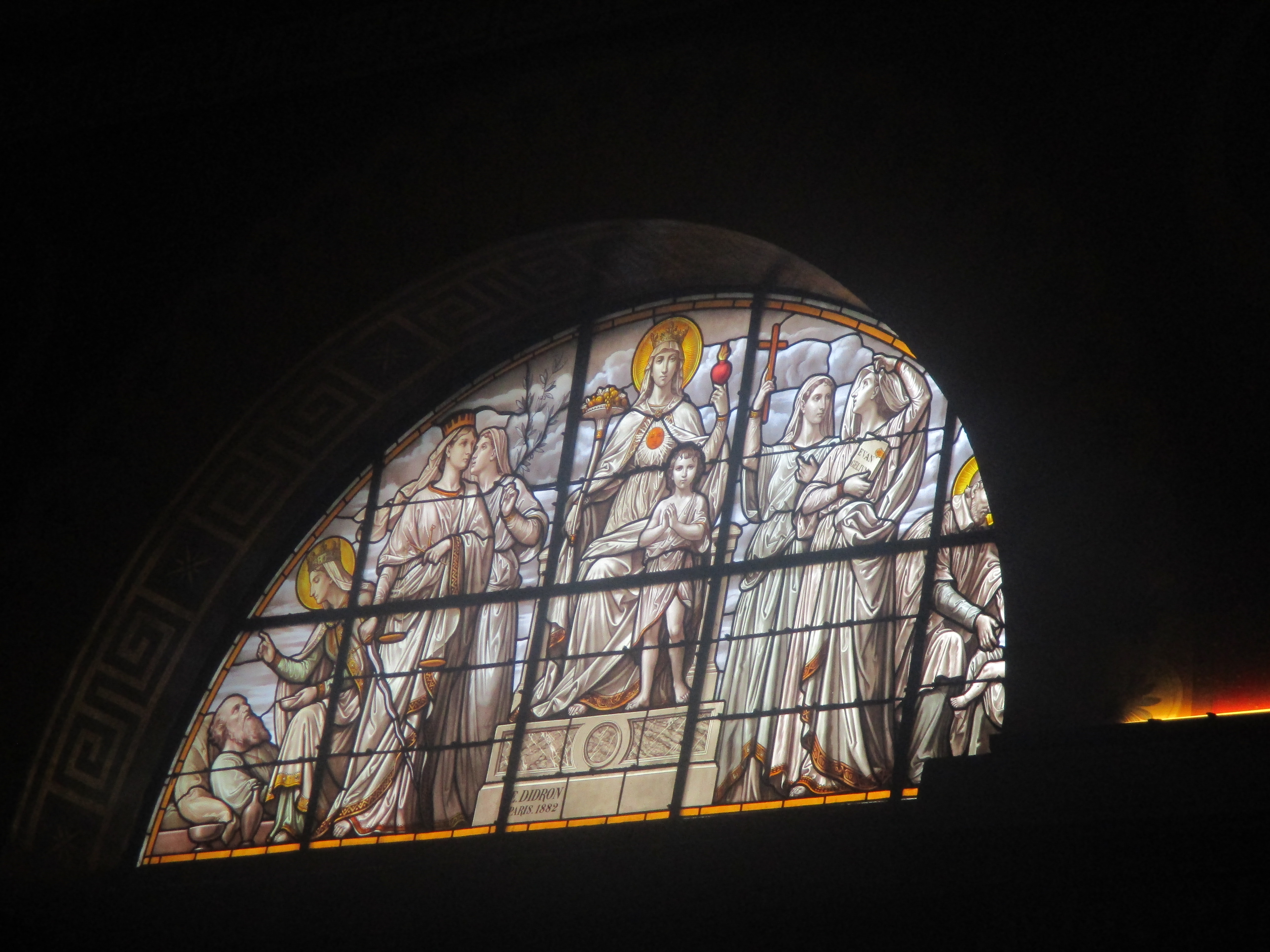

Five bays of the nave are decorated with unusual stained glass windows in the 19th century. The windows were made by Edouard-Amédée Didron (1836–92), with grisaille designs highlighted with silver and yellow. they illustrate the three theological virtues: Faith, Hope and Charity; and two of the four Cardinal Virtues; Force and Temperance. Didron, their creator, was a notable advocate of drawing upon earlier styles and sources of art, and a supporter of the Pre-Raphaelite movement in France.

== Organ ==
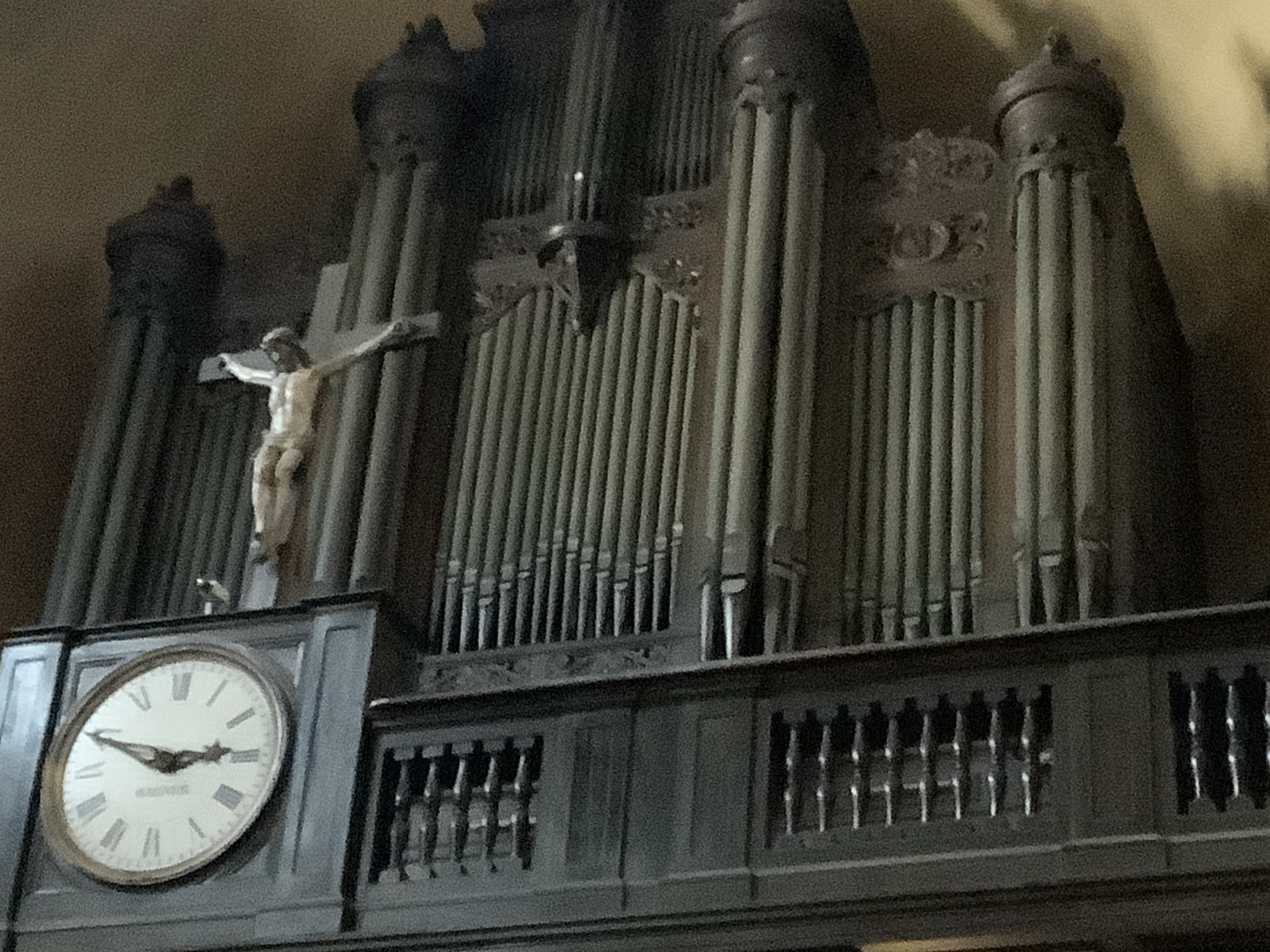
The grand organ, (1858) located in the Tribune over the portal

The church organ is located in the tribune over the portal at the back of the nave. The instrument was built by Cavaillé-Coll in 1858, and was updated in 1973.

== See also ==
- List of historic churches in Paris

== Online sources ==
- website of the church (in French)
- fr:Église Saint-Louis-d'Antin French Wikipedia article on the church
- "Patrimoine-Histoire.fr" Site on the art and history of church (in French)
