= Rue Paul-Escudier =

Street in Paris

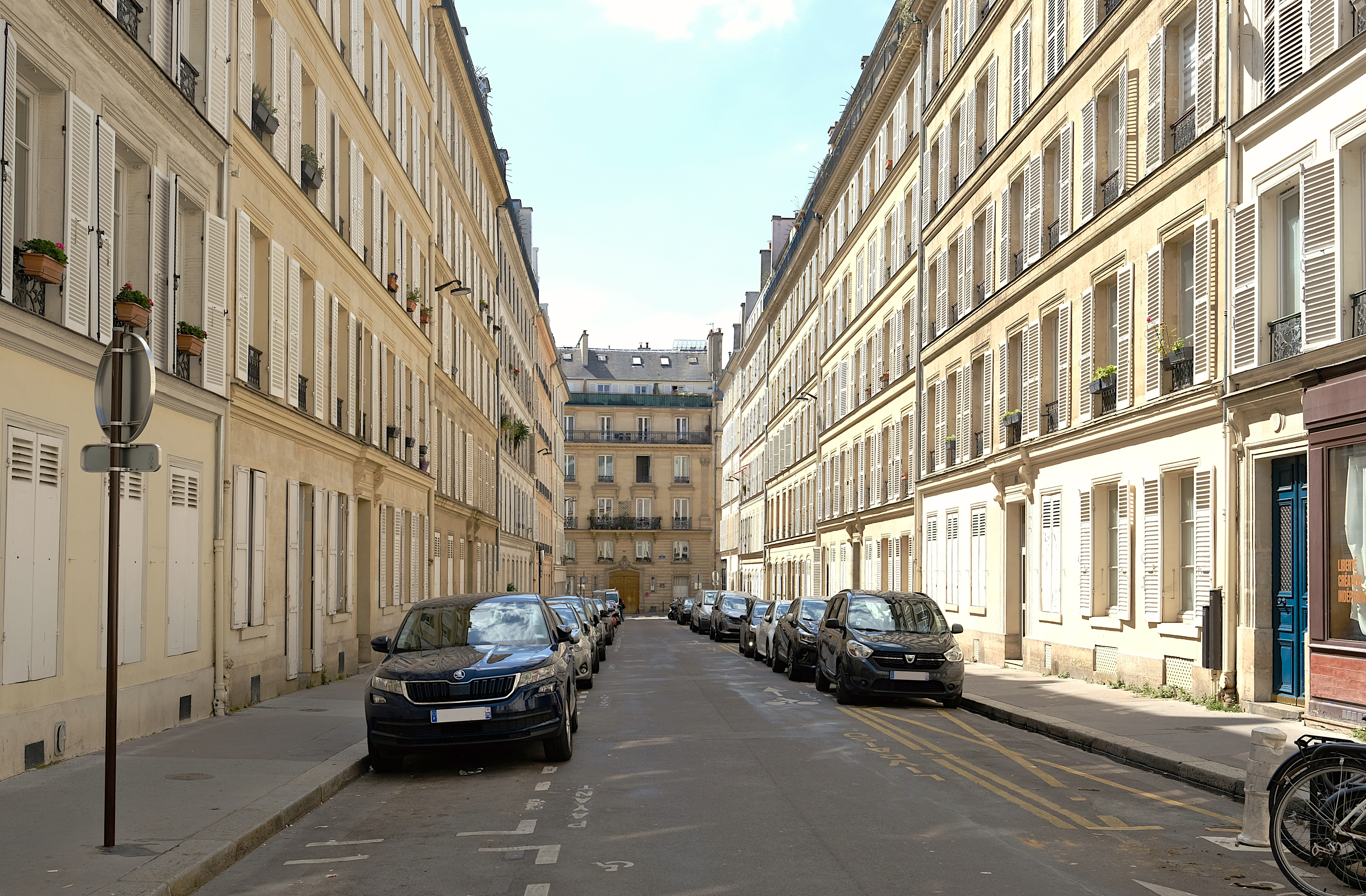
Rue Paul-Escudier in 2026

The Rue Paul-Escudier is a street that passes through the 9th arrondissement of Paris, France.

== Situation and access ==
The Rue Paul-Escudier is a public street in the 9th arrondissement of Paris starting at no. 56 rue Blanche and ending at no. 9 rue Henner.

== Origin of the name ==
The name of the street comes from the French politician Paul Escudier (1858–1931) who was deputy of the arrondissement as well as councilor of the district.

== History ==
Originally, the street was called the 'Cité Gaillard', as it was on the lands of Mr. Gaillard, who was an entrepreneur in masonry. During that period, the street was closed by grids at its ends, before becoming a public street later in 1903, as it was renamed 'Rue Gaillard'. The current name of the street was decided by the decree of May 10, 1933.

The French painter Paul Jourdy (1805–1856) lived in the street.
