= Passage du Havre =

Arcade in Paris, France

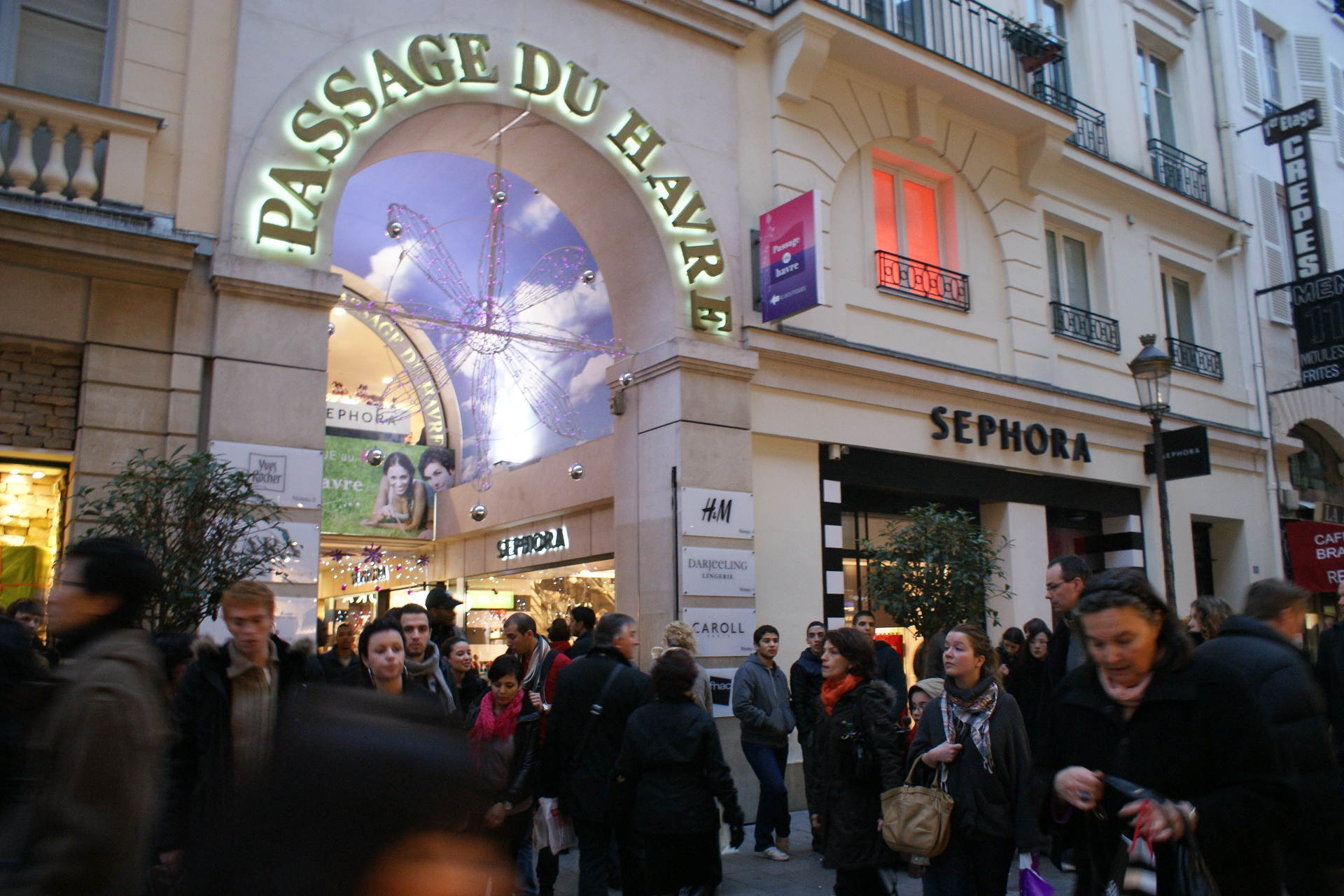
- Entrance of the Passage du Havre on the Rue de Caumartin

- Location within Paris
- Length: 115 m (377 ft)
- Width: 3.65 m (12.0 ft)
- Arrondissement: 9th
- Quarter: Rue de la Chaussée-d'Antin
- Coordinates: 48°52′30″N 2°19′40″E
- From: 69 Rue de Caumartin
- To: 109 Rue Saint-Lazare

Construction
- Completion: 1845

The Passage du Havre is one of the covered passages of Paris. Formerly known for fish shops and railway modelling (e.g. Hornby, La Maison du Train), the arcade was rebuilt in the late 1990s as a modern mall, at the same time as the construction of Paris' RER E underground railway line. The redevelopment aimed to attract shops more in line with the character of the Quartier de l'Opéra-Saint Lazare, the heart of Paris's major business district.

The passage is located near the Gare Saint-Lazare and directly opposite the Hilton Paris Opera (the station's hotel). It begins at the Place du Havre and extends to Rue de Caumartin where it ends.

The shopping centre is owned and maintained by Eurocommercial Properties N.V.

== See also ==
- Passages couverts de Paris
