= Square Montholon =

Urban park in Paris, France

Coordinates: 48°52′37″N 2°20′47″E

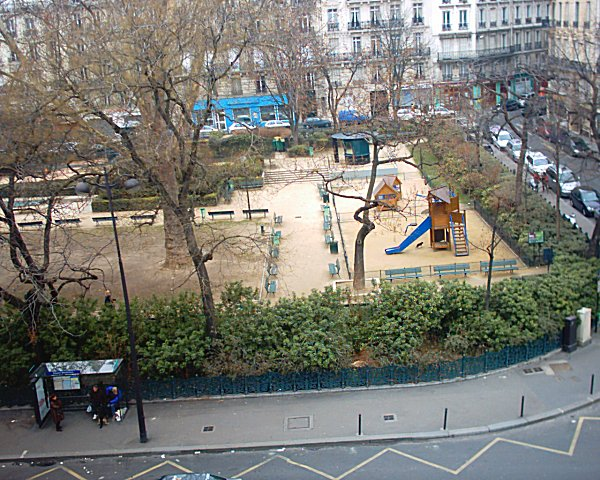
A winter view of the square from the fifth floor of the Hôtel Montholon.

The Square Montholon is a square in the 9th arrondissement of Paris, France.

Construction of the 4571 m^{2} square began in 1862, costing 160,000 francs, at the time of building of Rue Lafayette, and opened in 1863.

The square comprises two terraces and is encircled by a Louis-Philippe-style fence. The central grass garden is home to two hundred-year-old 30 m tall oriental plane trees as well a marble statuary group by Julien Lorieux dedicated to the young working women of the quarter.

A fountain with a bronze sculpture, “The Bear, the Eagle and the Vulture”, was removed and melted down in 1941 or 1942, during the Nazi occupation of Paris.
