= Rue de Caumartin =

Street in Paris, France

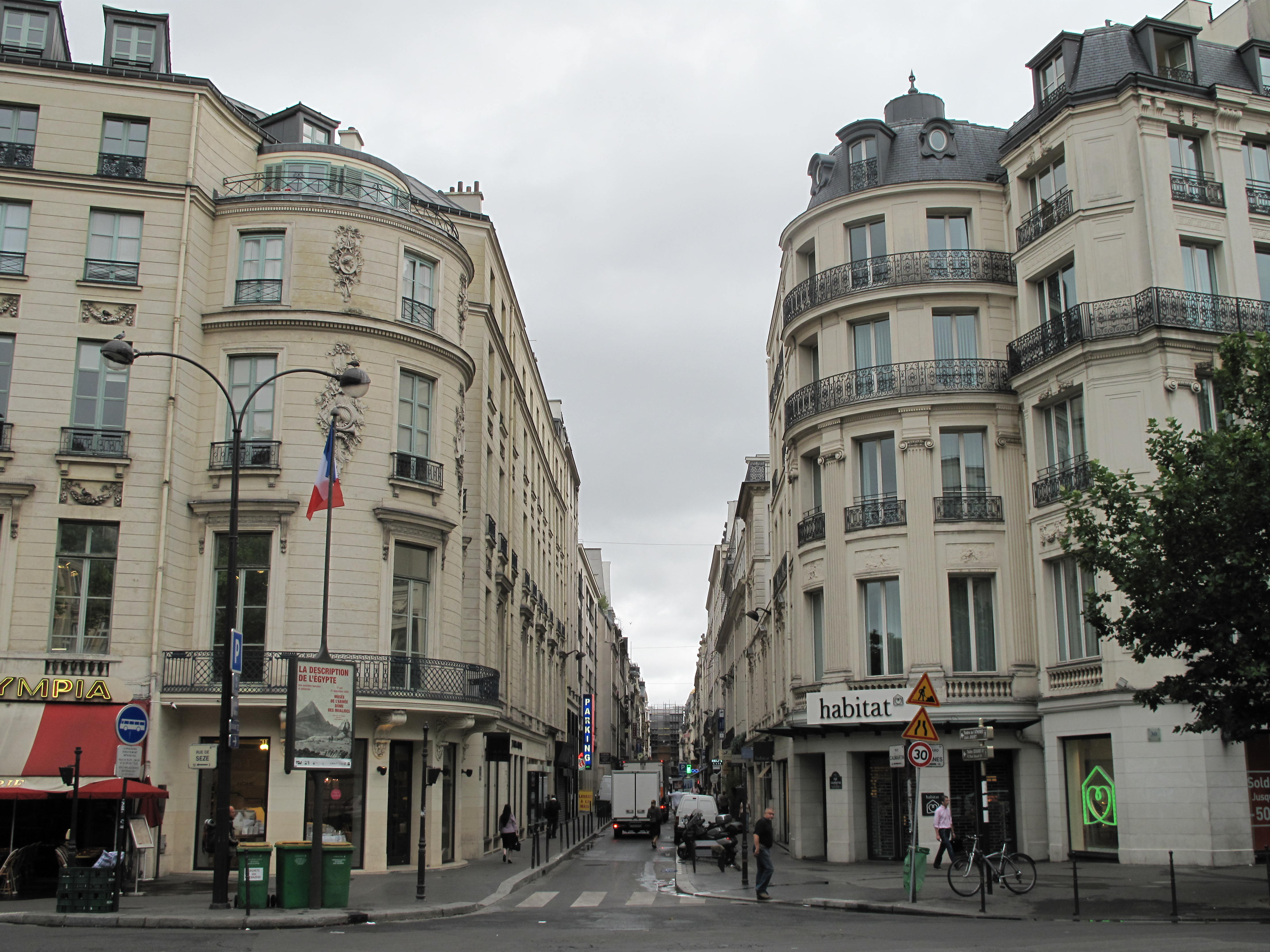
- With mansion Marin-Delahaye on the left and mansion d'Aumont on the right.

- Location within Paris
- Arrondissement: 9th
- Quarter: Chaussée-d'Antin
- Coordinates: 48°52′21.07″N 2°19′41.68″E
- From: Boulevard Haussmann
- To: Rue Saint-Lazare

Construction
- Completion: 1780

The Rue de Caumartin is a street in the 9th arrondissement of Paris. It received its name from Antoine-Louis Lefebvre de Caumartin, marquis de Saint-Ange, Comte de Moret (1725-1803), who was prévôt des marchands (1778-1784). He gave the authorization to open the street on 3 July 1779.

Located near the Metro stations: Havre - Caumartin, Saint-Lazare and Opéra.

== History ==
Opened in 1780, the street extended from the Rue Basse-du-Rempart located at the foot of the rampart (now the Boulevard des Capucines) to the Rue Neuve-des-Mathurins through land acquired from the priests mathurins by Charles-Marin Delahaye, general-farmer. Further on the north, was the small Rue Thiroux, opened in 1773 by President Thiroux of Arconvillé. The small Rue Sainte-Croix opened further on the north in 1780 through marshes and fields. The Rue de Caumartin absorbed them on 5 May 1849.

The French architect Aubert built 28 mansions in the area, including the nos. 1 and 2, on each side of the street at the beginning and the junction with the Boulevard des Capucines. They were decorated with figures in half relief, small amours, medallions, and various ornaments. Both included an outside rotunda on the street.

== Notable places ==
- No. 1: Mansion Marin-Delahaye. Its roof bore a hanging gardens with shrubs, ponds, rocks, waterfalls, and statues, as well as columns and pyramids to hide chimneys. Mirabeau lived there in 1789.
- No. 2: Mansion d'Aumont, where lived from 1785 the maréchal d'Aumont, duke and pair de France, who joined the French Revolution and was rewarded by commanding the Garde Nationale.
- No. 5 (then No. 3): Louis Antoine de Saint-Just, deputy to the National Convention and member of the Committee of Public Safety, lived here from March to July 1794.
- No. 8: Stendhal wrote La Chartreuse de Parme (The Charterhouse of Parma) there. George Sand also lived there for a time, until 1816.
- No. 24: Former location of Le Grand Teddy cafe (closed in 1922), original location of The Grand Teddy tea-rooms paintings by Édouard Vuillard.
- No. 25: Theater Comédie-Caumartin.
- No. 26: Building where was installed the head office of the French Canal of Panama Company when it failed.
- No. 63: Église Saint-Louis d'Antin.
- No. 65: Annex entrance of the Lycée Condorcet.
- No. 66: One time residence of Édouard de Max, theatre actor and Marcel Petiot, war-time serial killer.
- No. 69: Entrance of the Passage du Havre.
