= 9th arrondissement of Paris =

- Municipal arrondissement
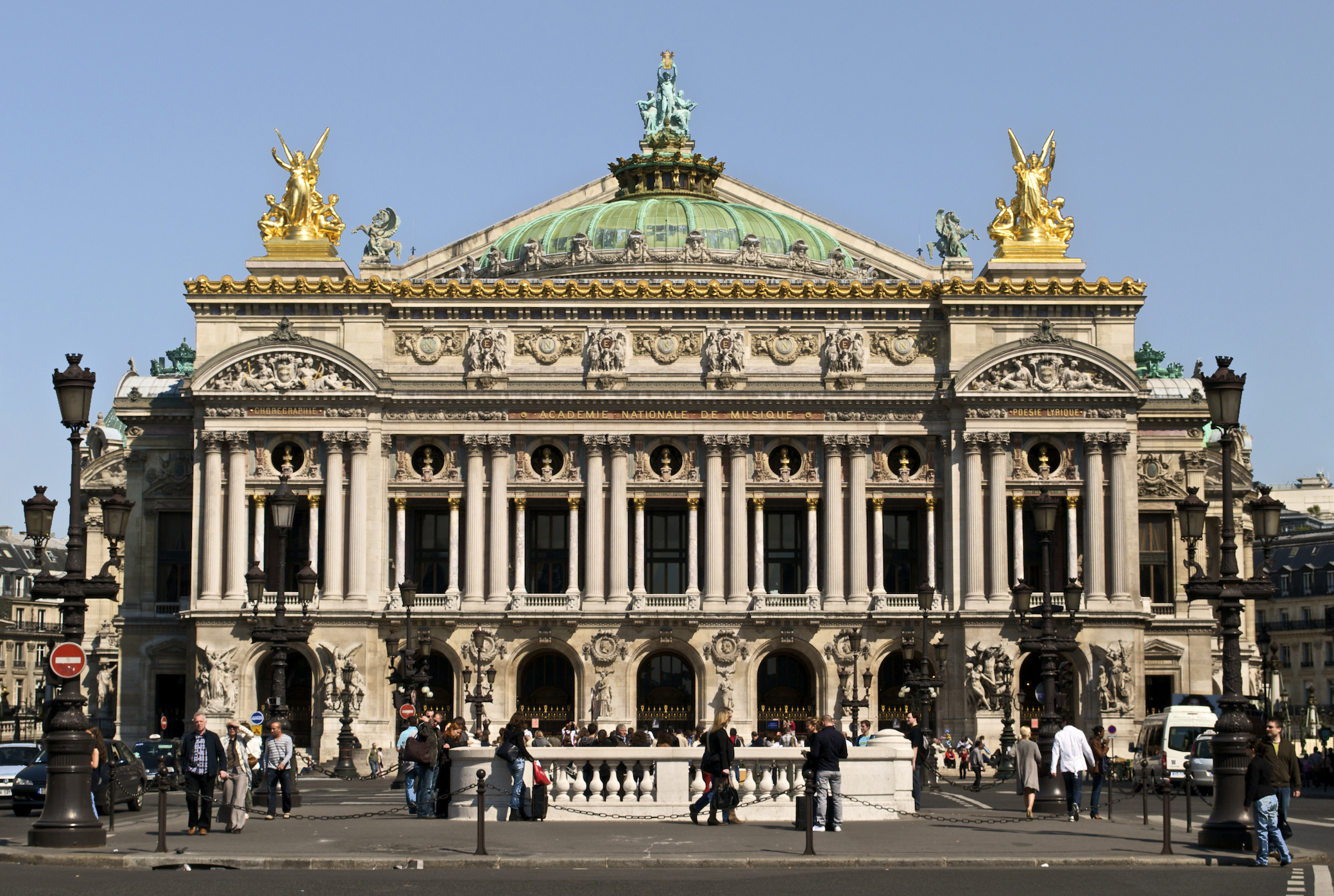
- The Palais Garnier on the Place de l'Opéra

- Coat of arms

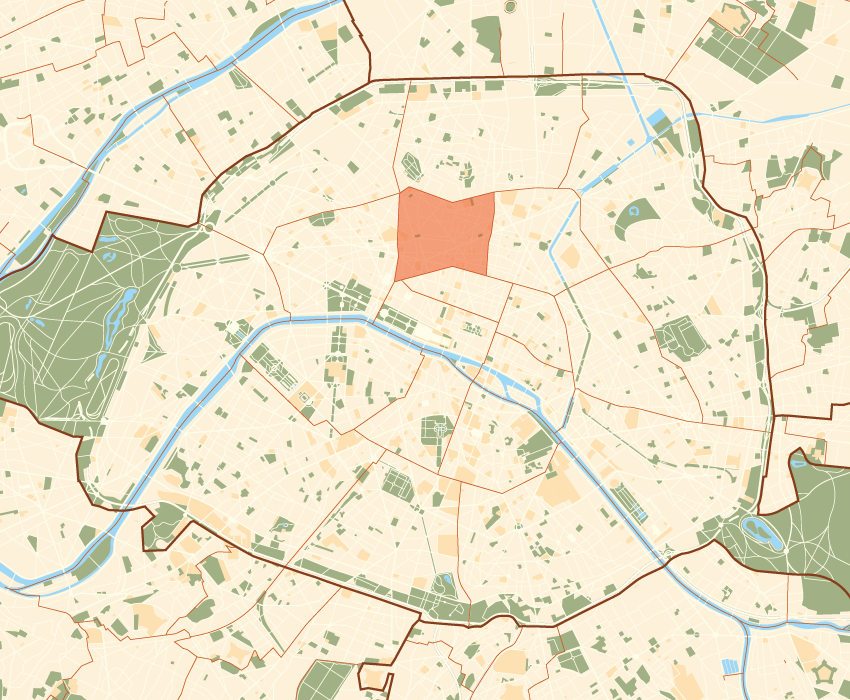
- Location within Paris
- Coordinates: 48°52′42″N 2°20′13″E
- Country: France
- Region: Île-de-France
- Department: Paris
- Commune: Paris

Government
  - Mayor (2020–2026): Delphine Bürkli (Horizons)
- Area: 2.18 km^{2} (0.84 sq mi)
- Population (2023): 57,271
  - Density: 26,300/km^{2} (68,000/sq mi)
- INSEE code: 75109

The 9th arrondissement of Paris (French: 9e arrondissement de Paris) is one of the twenty arrondissements of the capital city of France. In spoken French, it is referred to as le neuvième ([nœvjɛm]; 'ninth').

The arrondissement, called Opéra, is located on the right bank of the River Seine. It contains many places of cultural, historical and architectural interest, including the Palais Garnier (home to the Paris Opera), on the Place de l'Opéra, together with the InterContinental Paris Le Grand Hotel's Café de la Paix, as well as Boulevard Haussmann, with the Galeries Lafayette and Printemps, two large department stores, in addition to the Le Figaro newspaper. It hosts two historic churches, noted for their classical architecture, art and decoration: Saint-Louis-d'Antin (18th c.) and Notre-Dame-de-Lorette (19th c.).

The arrondissement also contains a number of theatres and music venues including the Olympia, Folies Bergère, Théâtre Mogador, Théâtre Édouard VII and Théâtre de Paris. Along with the 2nd and 8th arrondissements, it hosts one of the business centres of Paris, located around the Palais Garnier. In 2023, it had a population of 57,271.

== Geography ==
The land area of this arrondissement is 2.179 km^{2} (0.841 sq mi; 538 acres).

=== Quarters ===
The quarters of the 9th arrondissement

- Quartier Saint-Georges (33)
- Quartier Chaussée-d'Antin (34)
- Quartier Faubourg-Montmartre (35)
- Quartier Rochechouart (36)

The area in the north-west of the 9th is sometimes called "New Athens".

=== Main streets and squares ===
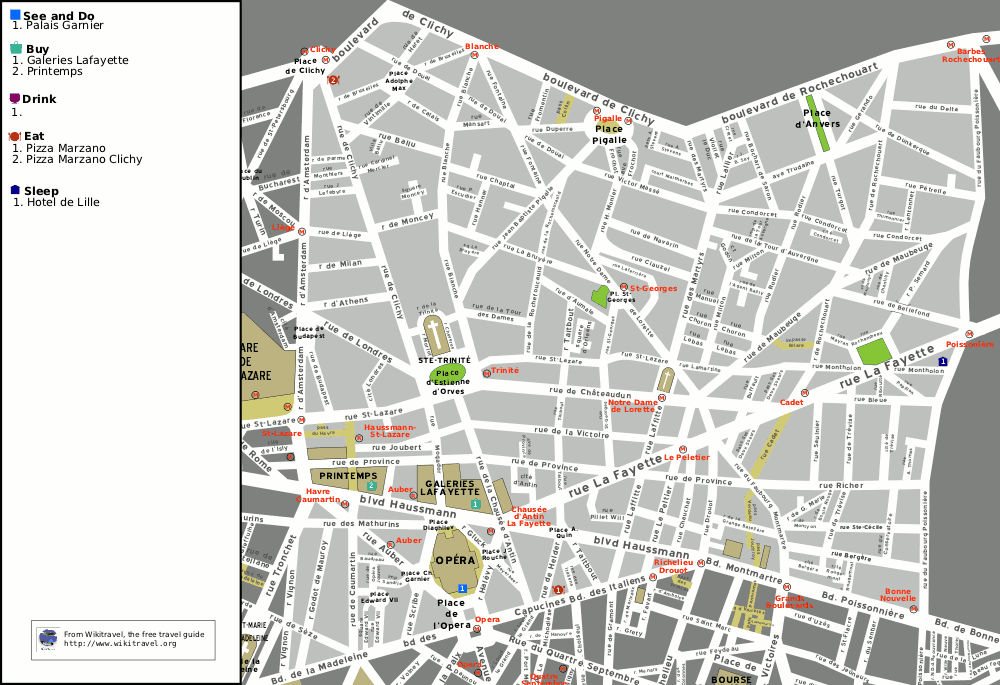
Map of the 9th arrondissement

- Place de l'Opéra
- Boulevard des Capucines (partial)
- Boulevard des Italiens (partial)
- Rue Bleue
- Rue des Martyrs (partial)
- Boulevard Haussmann (partial)
- Rue de la Chaussée-d'Antin
- Passage du Havre
- Square Montholon
- Boulevard de Clichy (partial)
- Rue La Fayette (partial)
- Rue de Provence (partial)
- Rue Saint-Lazare (partial)
- Place de Clichy (partial)
- Rue de la Victoire
- Rue de Caumartin
- Rue Laffitte
- Place Pigalle

=== Places of interest ===
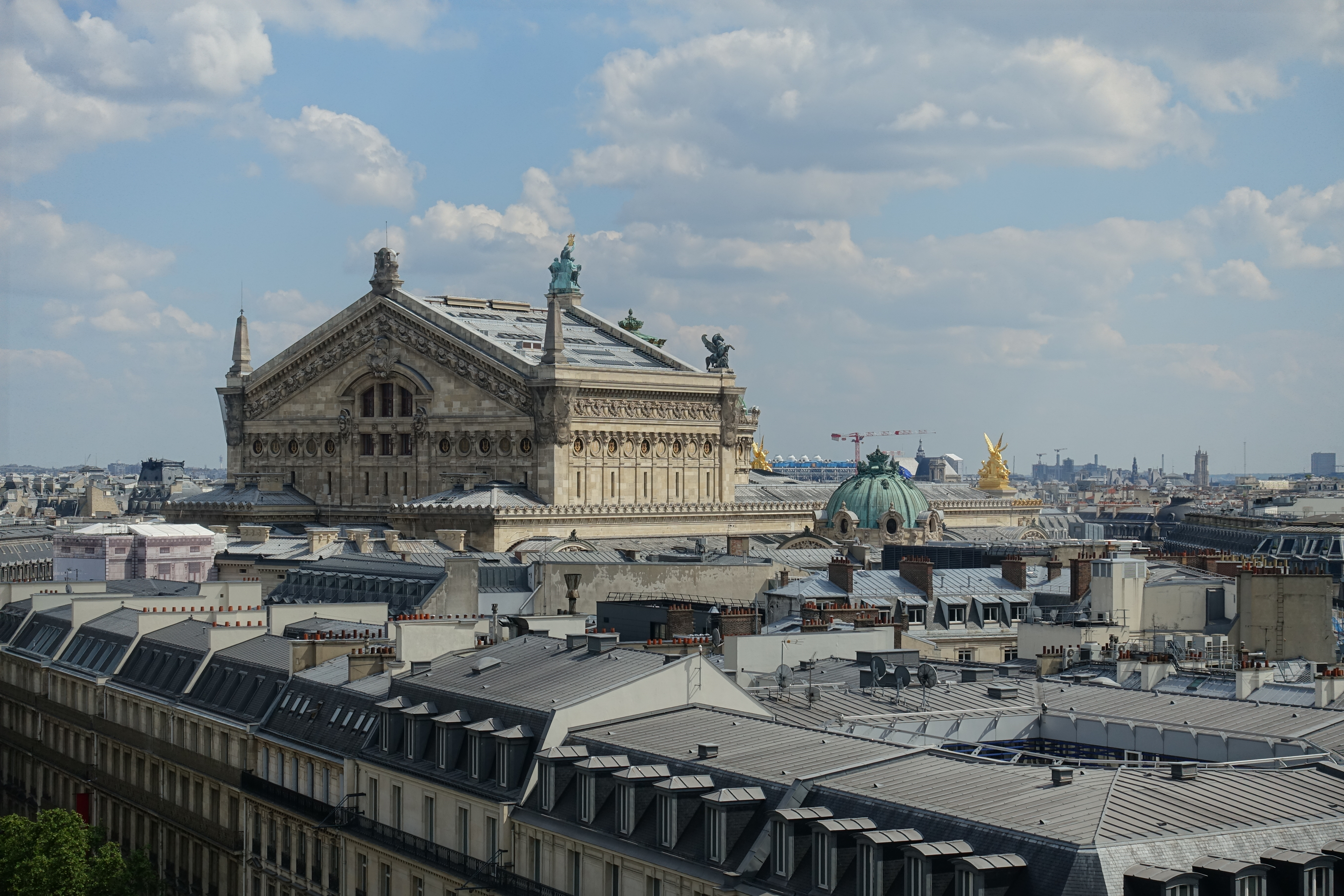
Opéra Garnier seen from the Printemps Haussmann

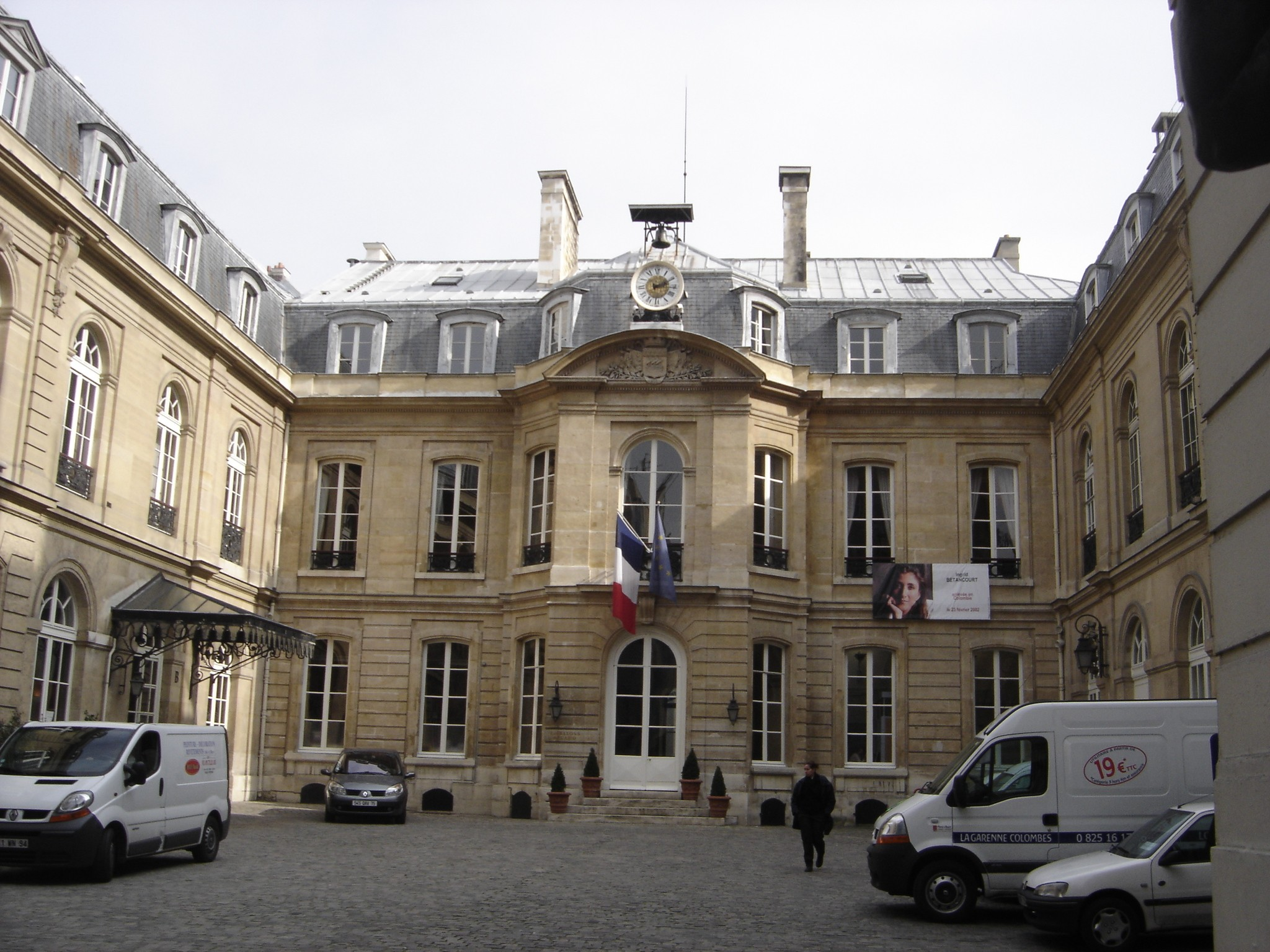
Mairie du IX^{e} arrondissement

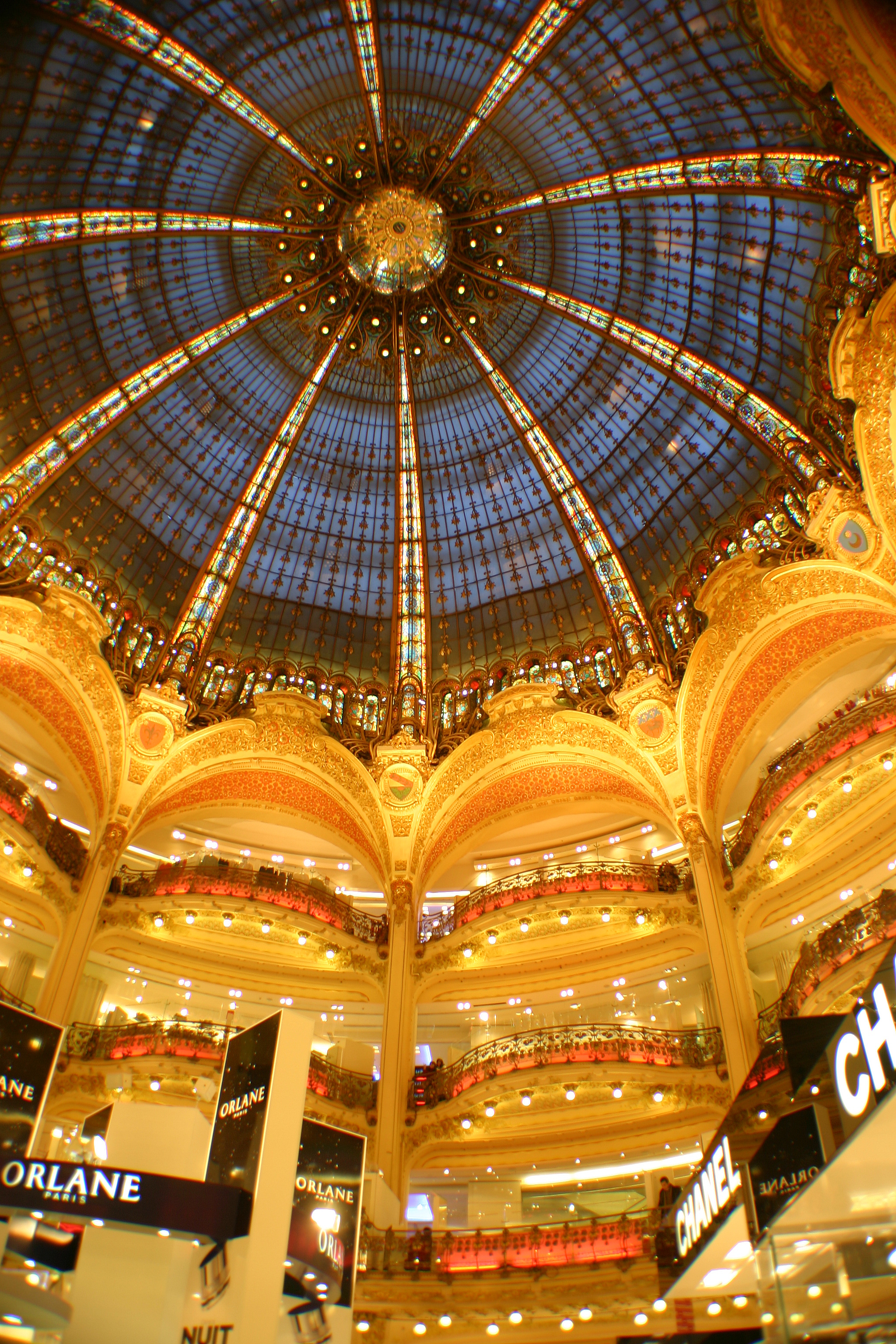
Galeries Lafayette flagship store

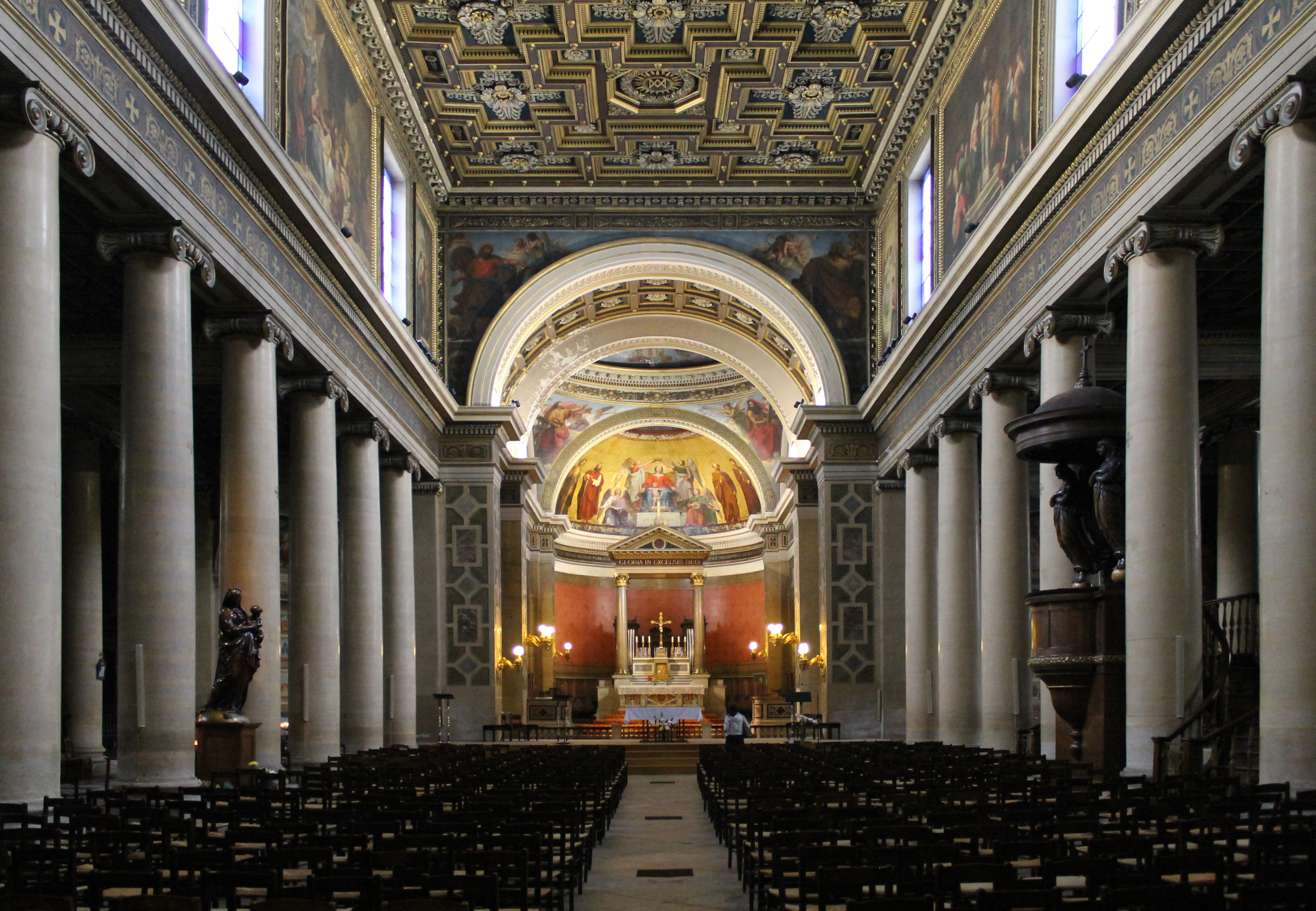
Notre-Dame-de-Lorette historic church

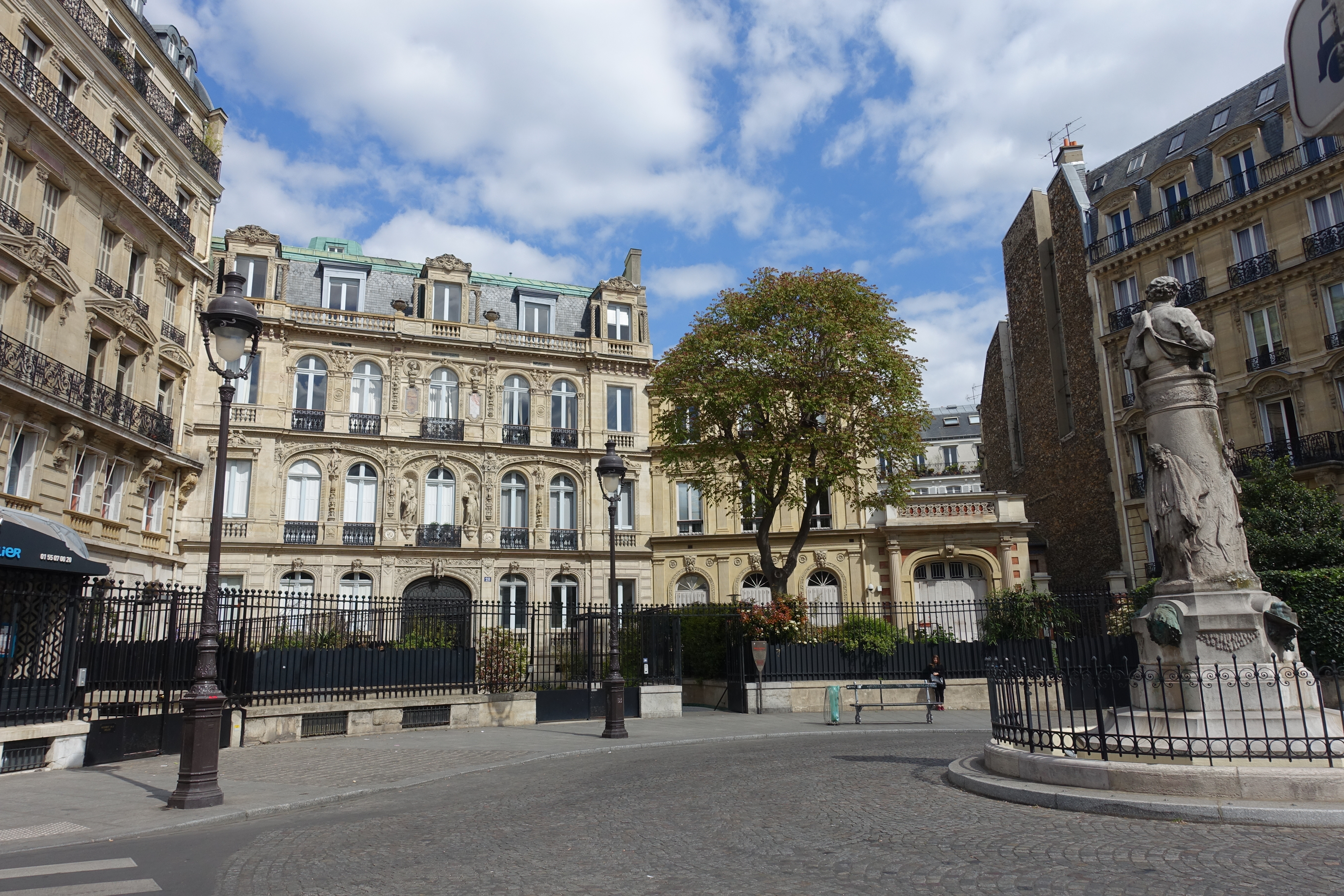
Place Saint-Georges

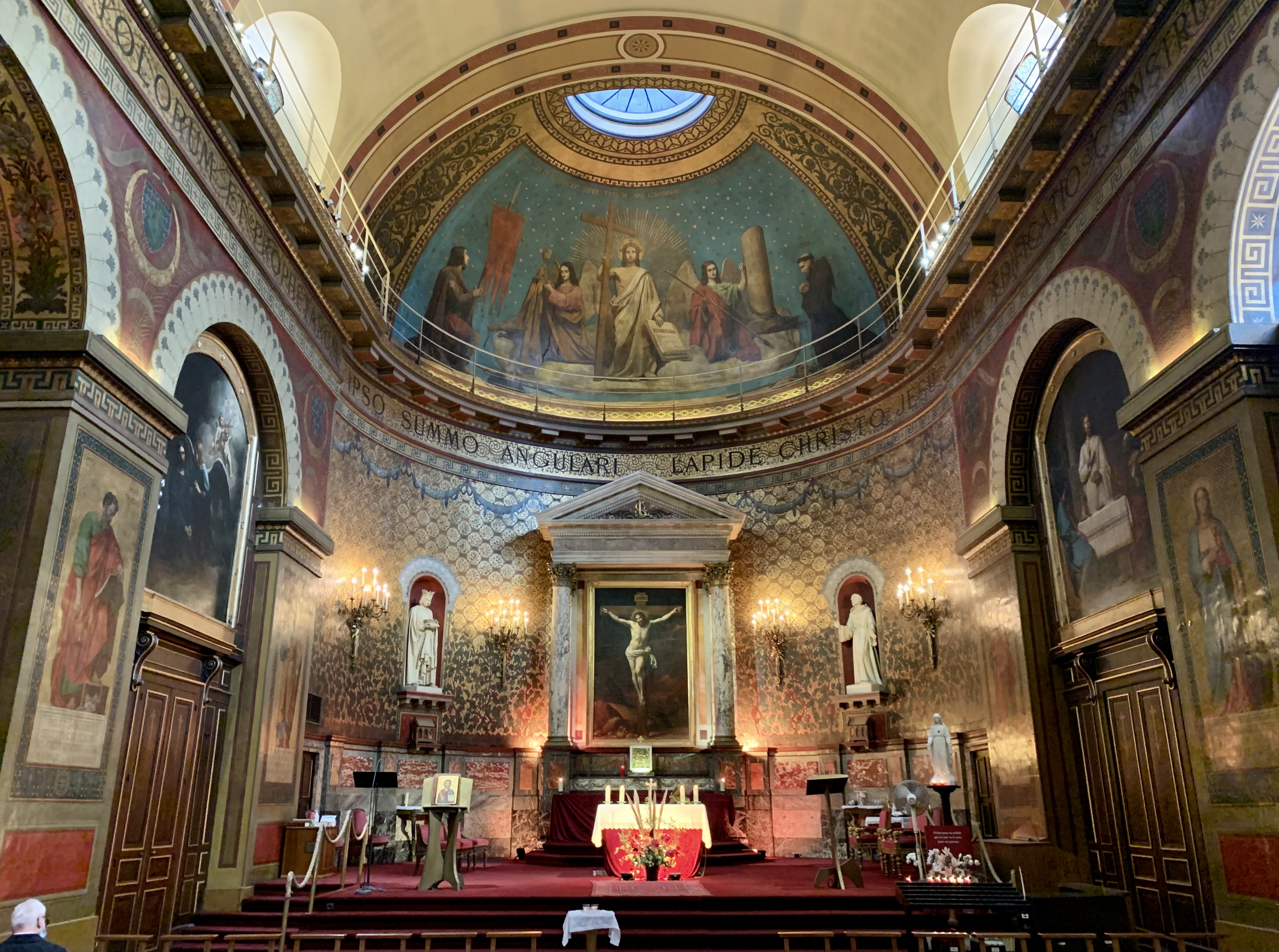
Saint-Louis-d'Antin historic church

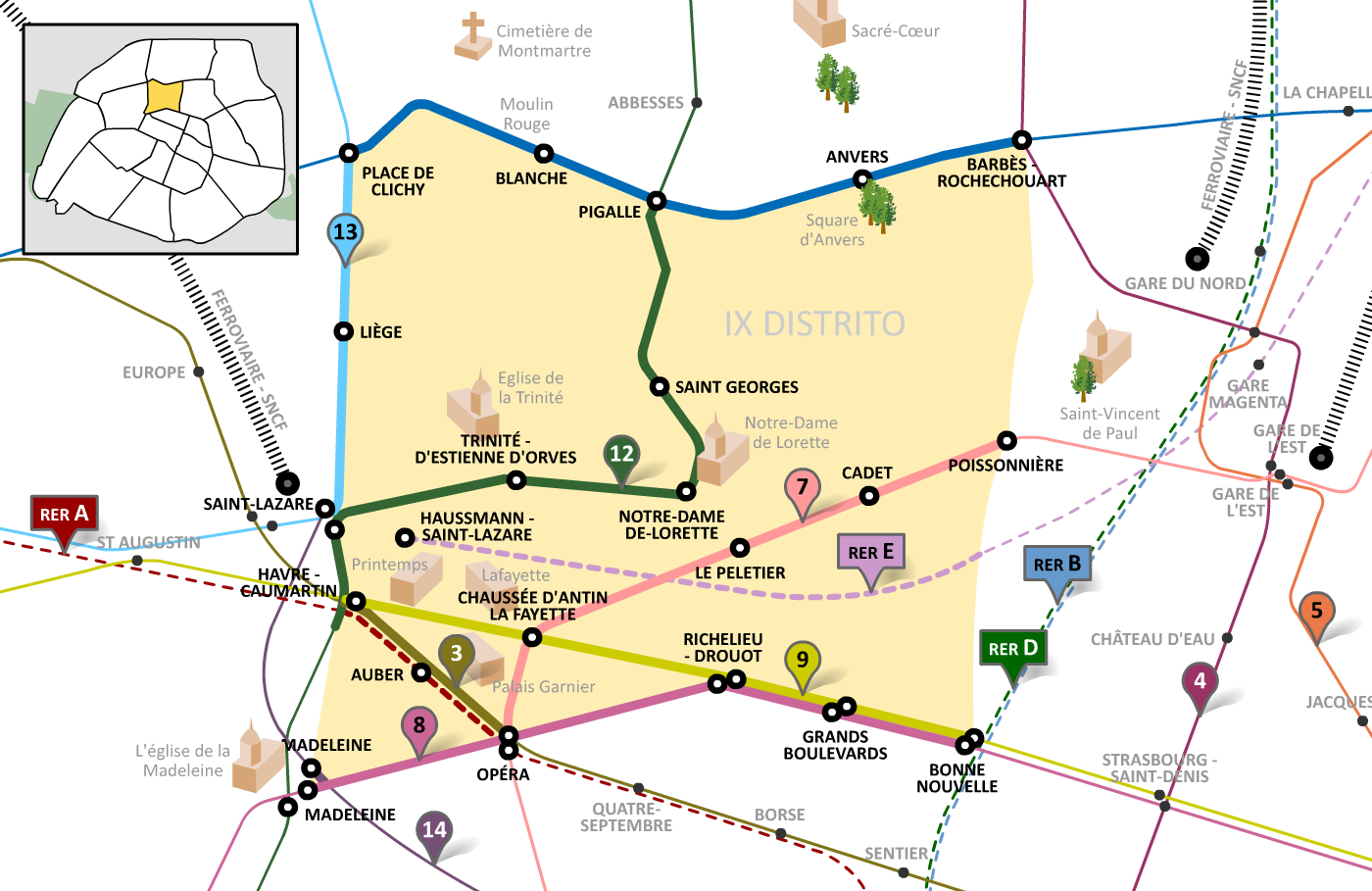
Public transport in the arrondissement

- Bibliothèque-Musée de l'Opéra National de Paris
- Folies Bergère at 32, Rue Richer
- Fondation Dosne-Thiers
- Hôtel Drouot, auction house
- Opera Garnier ("Paris Opera")
- Galeries Lafayette (flagship store) at 40, Boulevard Haussmann
- Paris Olympia
- Printemps department store (flagship store)
- Maison Souquet, hotel
- Musée de la Franc-Maçonnerie
- Musée Grévin
- Musée Gustave Moreau at 14, Rue de la Rochefoucauld
- Musée du Parfum
- Musée de la Vie Romantique
- Notre-Dame-de-Lorette, Paris
- Parts of Pigalle area
- Saint-Louis-d'Antin historic church (18th c.)
- Takashimaya Paris

Wikimedia France has its offices in the arrondissement, at 28 Rue de Londres.

== Economy ==
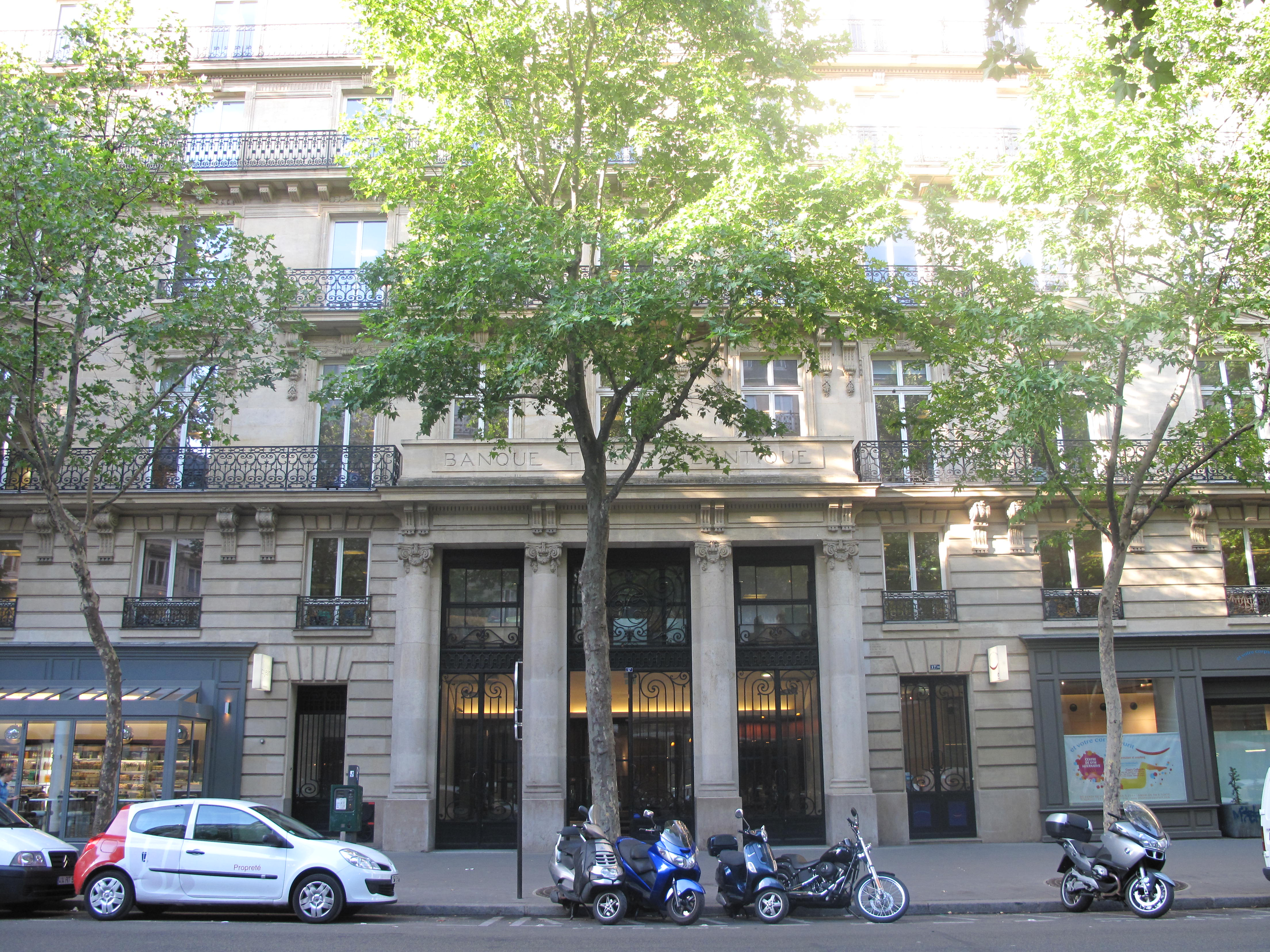
Groupe Danone head office

Groupe Danone has its head office in the 17 Boulevard Haussmann building in the 9th arrondissement. Danone moved there in 2002.

BNP Paribas has its head office in the arrondissement. Crédit Industriel et Commercial. Kroll Inc. also has an office in this arrondissement.

DotEmu has its head office in the 9th arrondissement.

Gameloft has its registered office and head office in the 9th arrondissement. It is on the fifth floor of 14 rue Auber.

Until June 1995, the head office of Société Générale was located in this arrondissement. On that month the head office moved to the Société Générale Towers. The former head office remains as the company's registered office.

Google Paris has its offices within the arrondissement.

The fashion School MOD'SPE Paris is also located in the arrondissement.

== Demographics ==
The peak population of the 9th arrondissement occurred in 1811, when it had 124,337 inhabitants. Since then, the arrondissement has widely attracted business activity. As a result, in 1999 it held 111,939 jobs.

=== Historical population ===
Historical population

Year	Pop.	±% p.a.
1861	107,326	—
1872	103,767	−0.31%
1881	124,337	+2.03%
1891	121,289	−0.25%
1901	124,011	+0.22%
1911	119,629	−0.36%
1921	113,392	−0.53%
1931	102,797	−0.98%
1936	95,877	−1.38%
1946	96,666	+0.08%
1954	102,287	+0.71%

Year	Pop.	±% p.a.
1962	94,094	−1.04%
1968	84,969	−1.69%
1975	70,270	−2.68%
1982	64,134	−1.30%
1990	58,019	−1.24%
1999	55,838	−0.42%
2007	58,632	+0.61%
2012	59,474	+0.29%
2017	59,555	+0.03%
2023	57,271	−0.65%

Source: Demographia (1861-1999) and INSEE (1876-2023)

=== Immigration ===
Place of birth of residents of the 9th arrondissement in 1999
Born in metropolitan France	Born outside metropolitan France			
78.3%	21.7%			
78.3%	Born in overseas France	Born in foreign countries with French citizenship at birth^{1}	EU-15 immigrants^{2}	Non-EU-15 immigrants
78.3%	0.8%	4.6%	5.6%	10.7%
^{1} This group is made up largely of former French settlers, such as pieds-noirs in Northwest Africa, followed by former colonial citizens who had French citizenship at birth (such as was often the case for the native elite in French colonies), as well as to a lesser extent foreign-born children of French expatriates. A foreign country is understood as a country not part of France in 1999, so a person born for example in 1950 in Algeria, when Algeria was an integral part of France, is nonetheless listed as a person born in a foreign country in French statistics.^{2} An immigrant is a person born in a foreign country not having French citizenship at birth. An immigrant may have acquired French citizenship since moving to France, but is still considered an immigrant in French statistics. On the other hand, persons born in France with foreign citizenship (the children of immigrants) are not listed as immigrants.
