= Napoleon III's Louvre expansion =

Iconic Paris transformation project of the Second French Empire

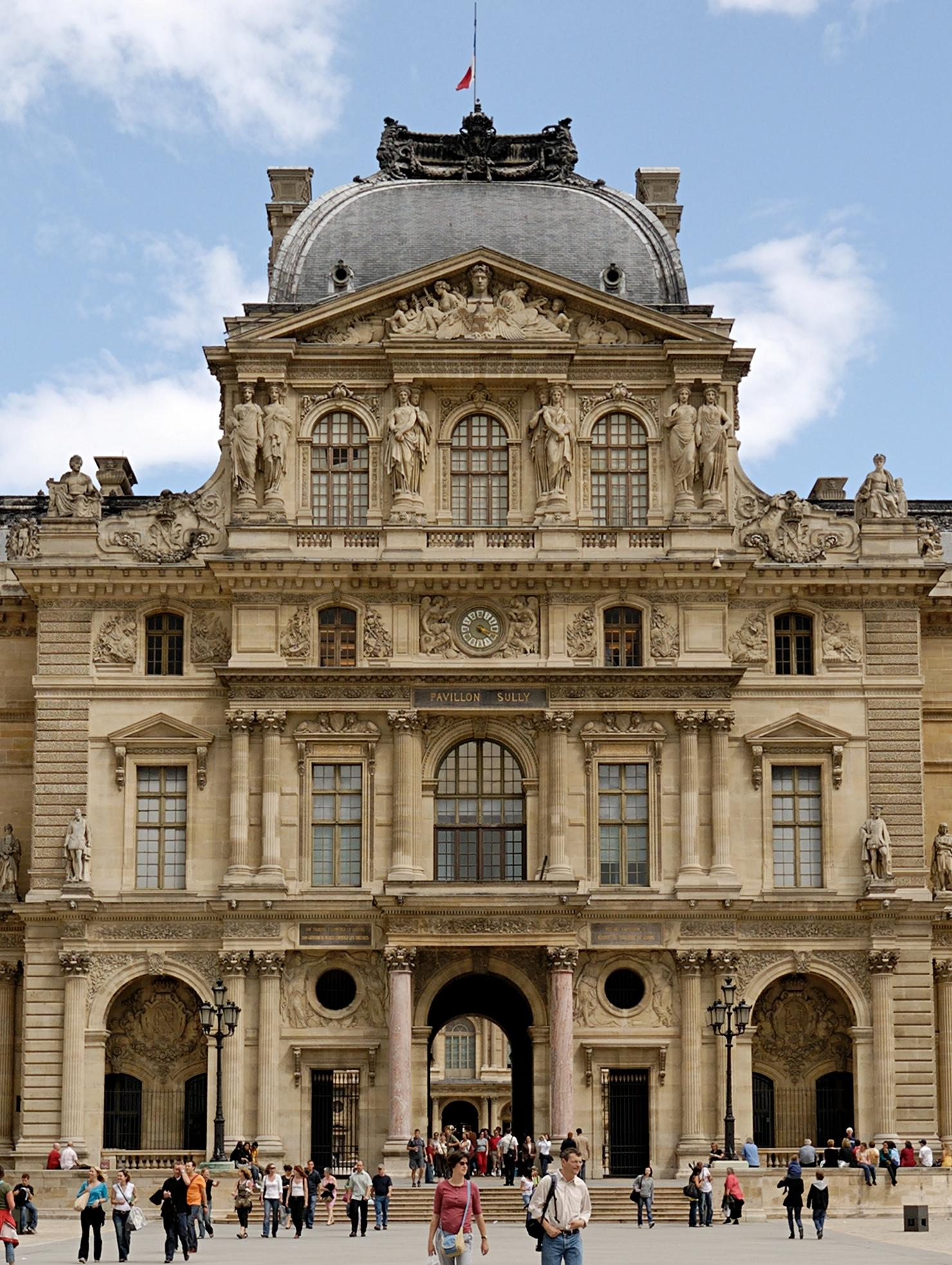
The Louvre's pavillon de l'Horloge, refaced in the 1850s at the eastern end of the Nouveau Louvre

The expansion of the Louvre under Napoleon III in the 1850s, known at the time and until the 1980s as the Nouveau Louvre or Louvre de Napoléon III, was an iconic project of the Second French Empire and a centerpiece of its ambitious transformation of Paris. Its design was initially produced by Louis Visconti and, after Visconti's death in late 1853, modified and executed by Hector-Martin Lefuel. It represented the completion of a centuries-long project, sometimes referred to as the grand dessein ("grand design"), to connect the old Louvre Palace around the Cour Carrée with the Tuileries Palace to the west. Following the Tuileries' arson at the end of the Paris Commune in 1871 and demolition a decade later, Napoleon III's nouveau Louvre became the eastern end of Paris's axe historique centered on the Champs-Élysées.

The project was initially intended for mixed ceremonial, museum, housing, military and administrative use, including the offices of the ministère d'État and ministère de la Maison de l'Empereur which after 1871 were attributed to the Finance Ministry. Since 1993, all its spaces have been used by the Louvre Museum.

== Project development ==
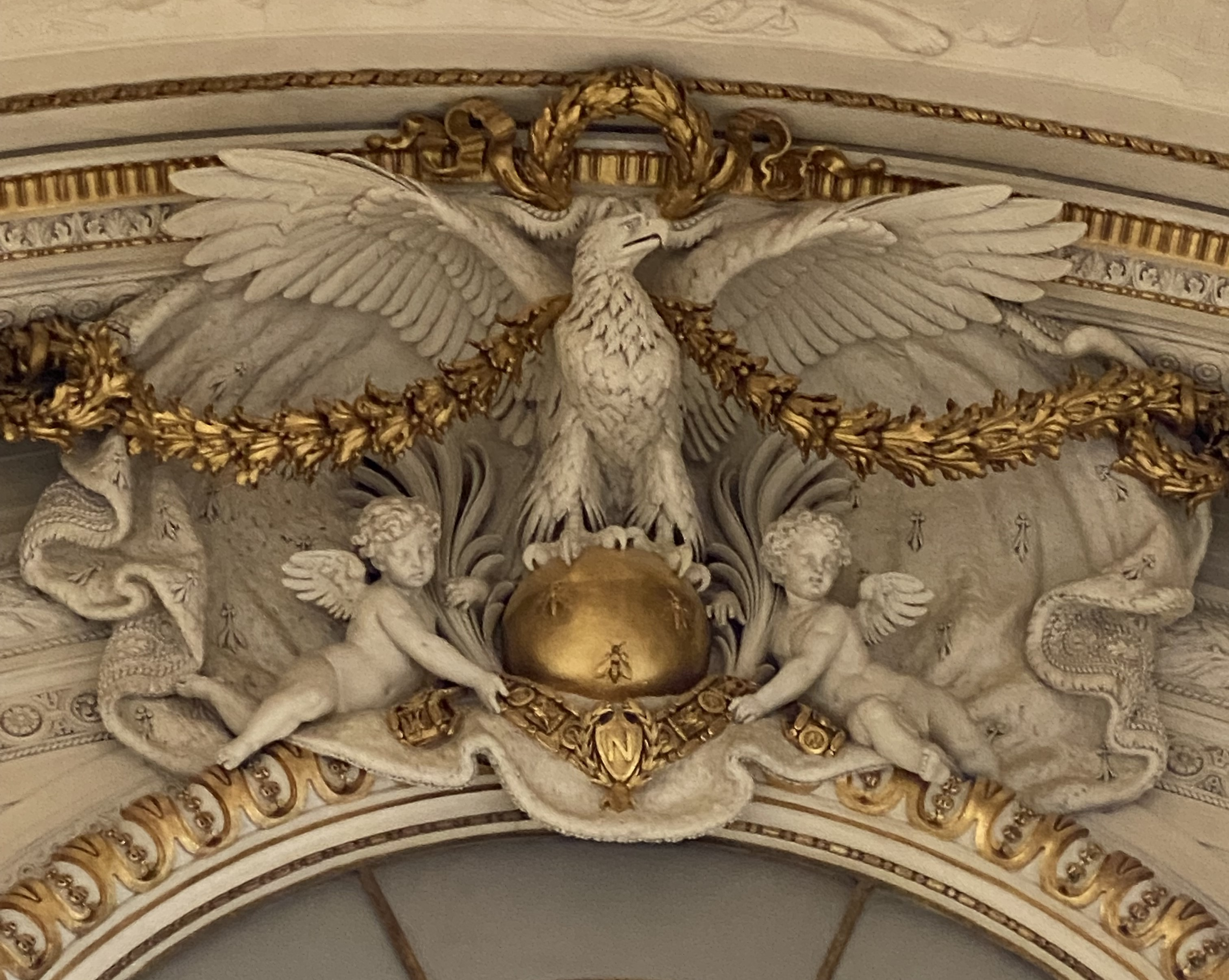
Imperial eagle and Napoleonic ornamentation on the ceiling of Escalier Mollien

Following the French Revolution of 1848, the provisional government adopted a decree on the continuation of the rue de Rivoli toward the east and the completion of the Louvre Palace's north wing, building on the steps taken to that effect under Napoleon. Architect Louis Visconti and his disciple Émile Trélat produced a draft design for completing the entire palace and presented it to the Legislative Assembly in 1849. These plans were not implemented, however, until President Louis-Napoleon was in a position to prioritize them following his successful coup d'état on 2 December 1851, even before he would formally rebrand himself as Emperor Napoleon III. On Napoleon III's order, Minister François-Xavier Joseph de Casabianca commissioned Visconti to design the new Louvre's plans on 30 January 1852, and the first stone was laid on 25 July 1852.

After Visconti died of a heart attack on 29 December 1853, Hector-Martin Lefuel, by then the architect of the Palace of Fontainebleau, was appointed to replace him. Lefuel modified Visconti's project, keeping its broad architectural outlines but opting for a considerably more exuberant decoration program that came to define the nouveau Louvre in the eyes of many observers. Old houses and other buildings that still encroached on the central space of the Louvre-Tuileries complex, between the Cour Carrée and the place du Carrousel, were swept clear. The project was swiftly executed, under the close attention of Napoleon III who visited the works on multiple occasions. The new buildings were substantially completed at the time of their inauguration by the emperor on 14 August 1857. The next day, which was the National Day as the date of "Saint-Napoléon", the public was invited to roam the new buildings.

The young American architect Richard Morris Hunt, who had studied under Lefuel at the École des Beaux-Arts, worked on the Louvre as a junior architect between April 1854 and September 1855, as also did Italian architect Marco Treves from May 1854 to September 1857. Following Hunt's graduation, Lefuel made him inspector of the Louvre work and allowed him to design the façade of the Pavillon de la Bibliothèque facing the rue de Rivoli.

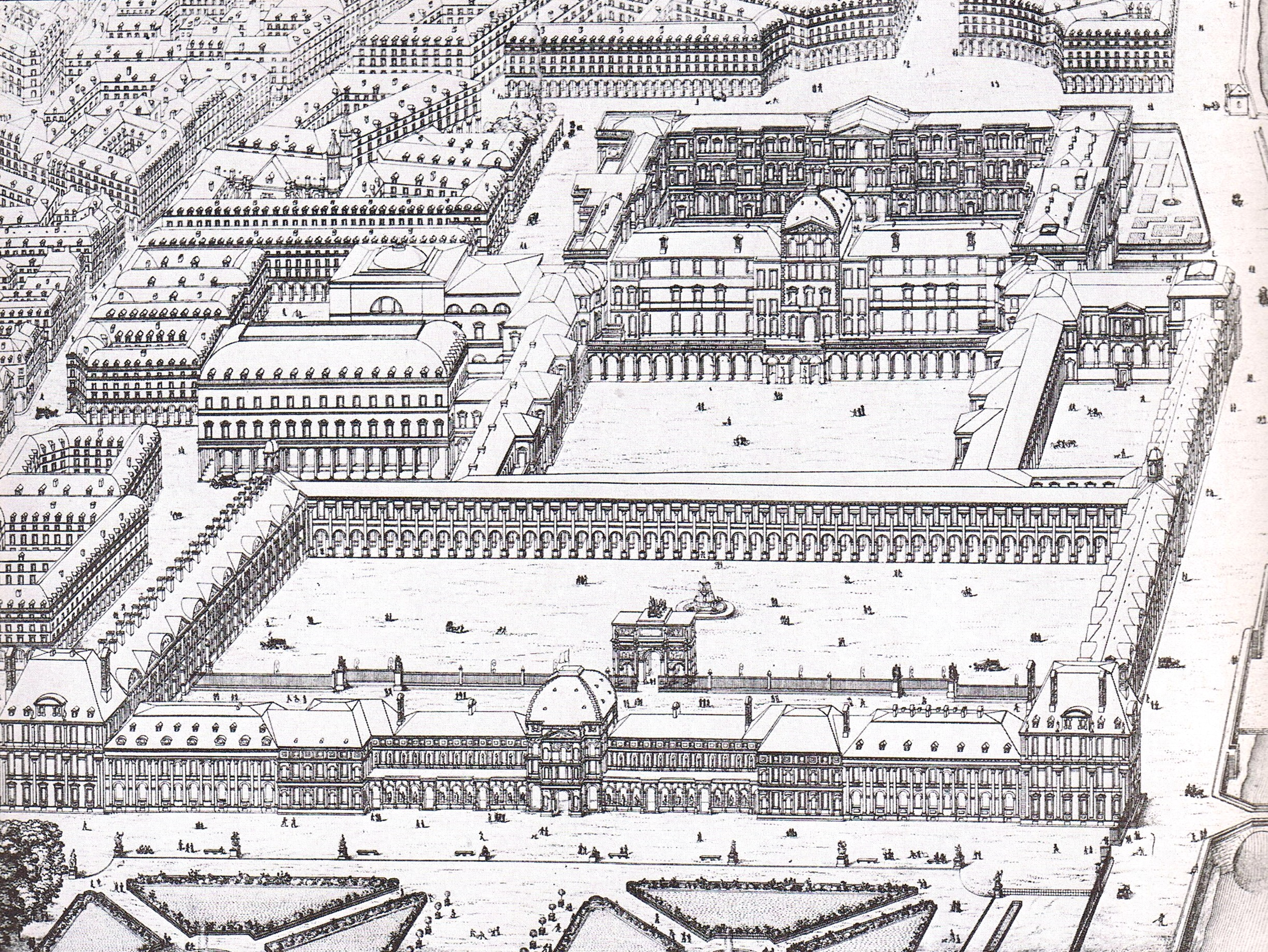
One of many earlier unrealized proposals for the completion of the Louvre, by Percier and Fontaine (1807 or 1808)

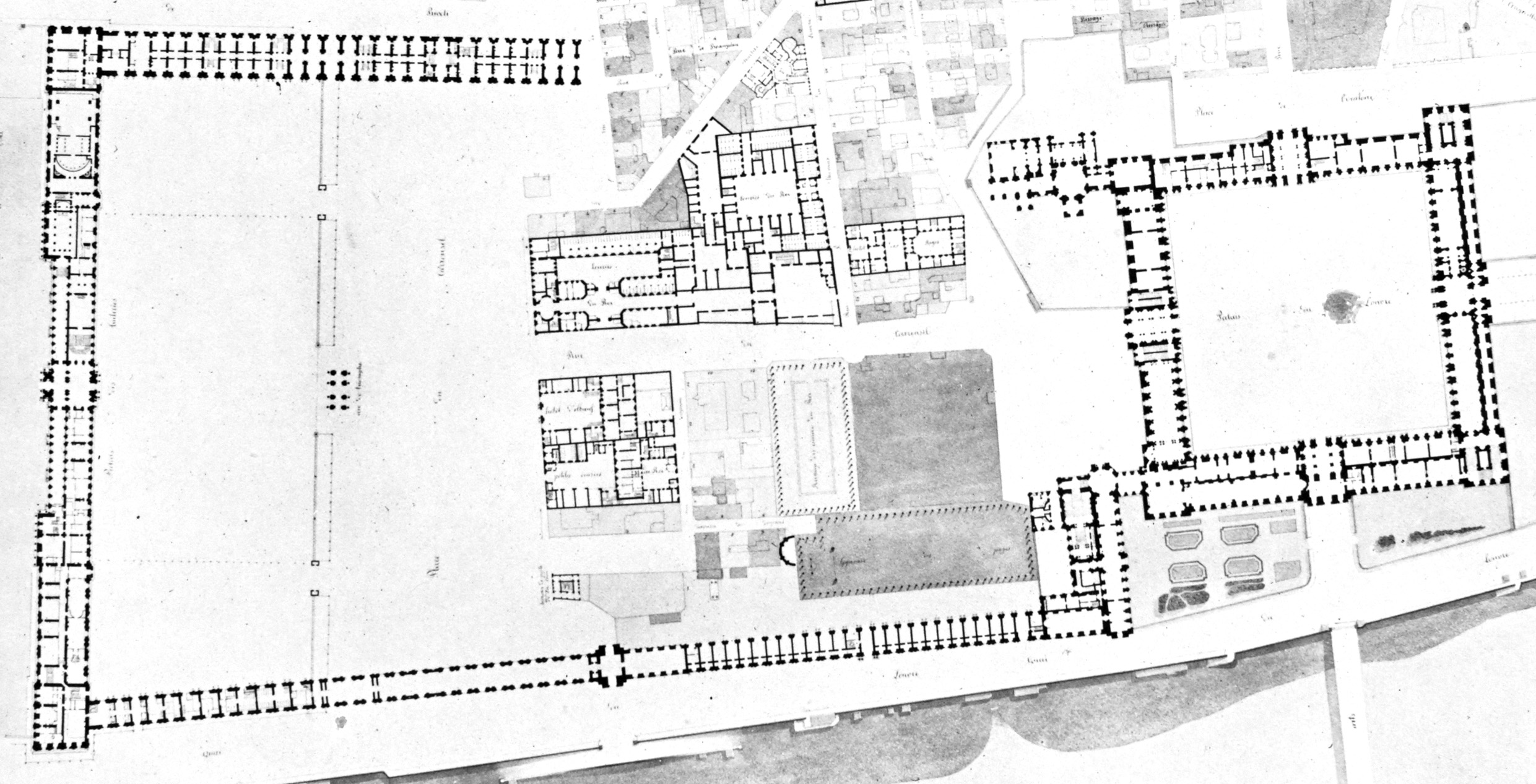
Plan of the unfinished Louvre by Charles Vasserot, showing the jumble of buildings on the location of the present-day Cour Napoléon (1830)

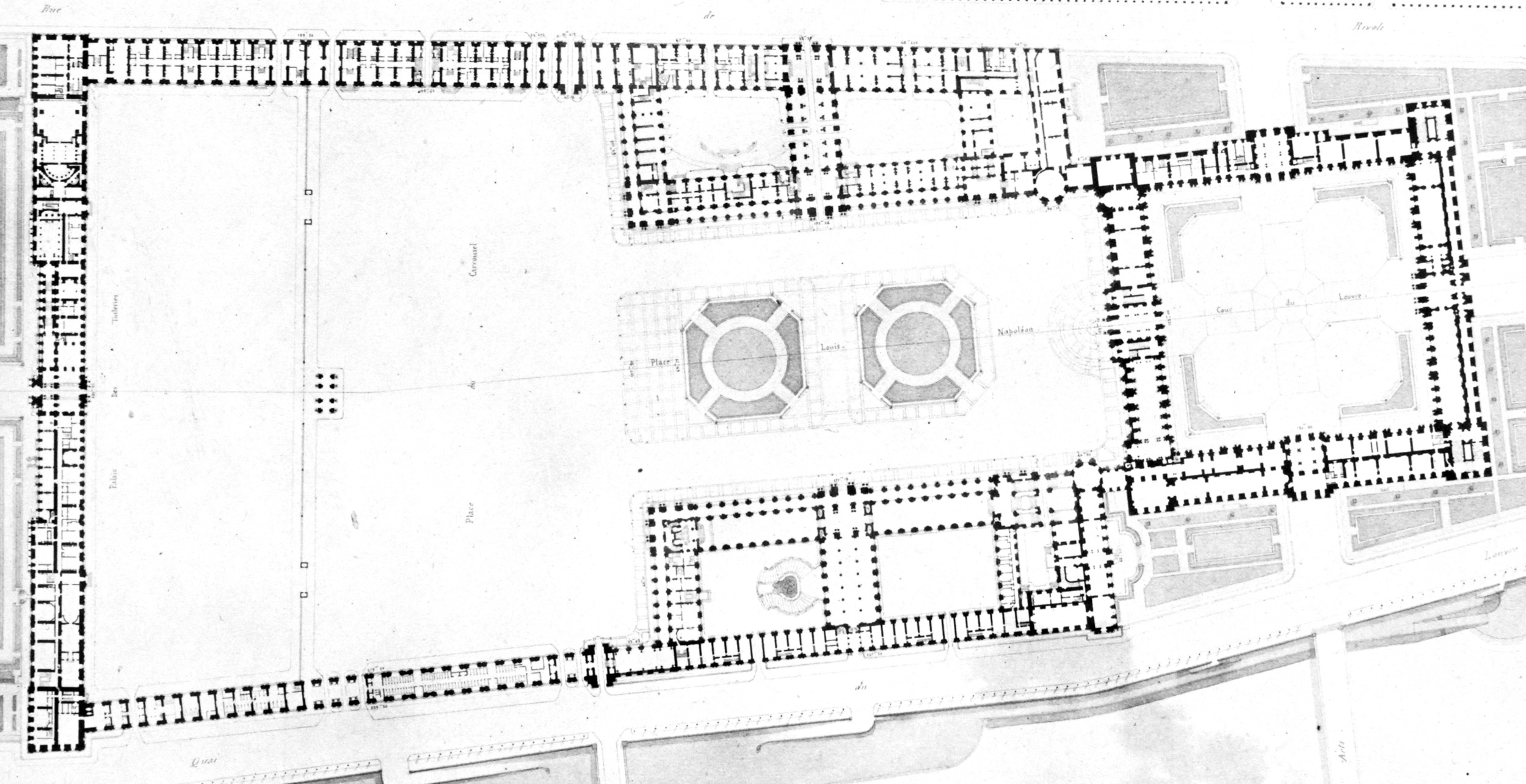
Design of the Louvre expansion by Louis Visconti (1853)
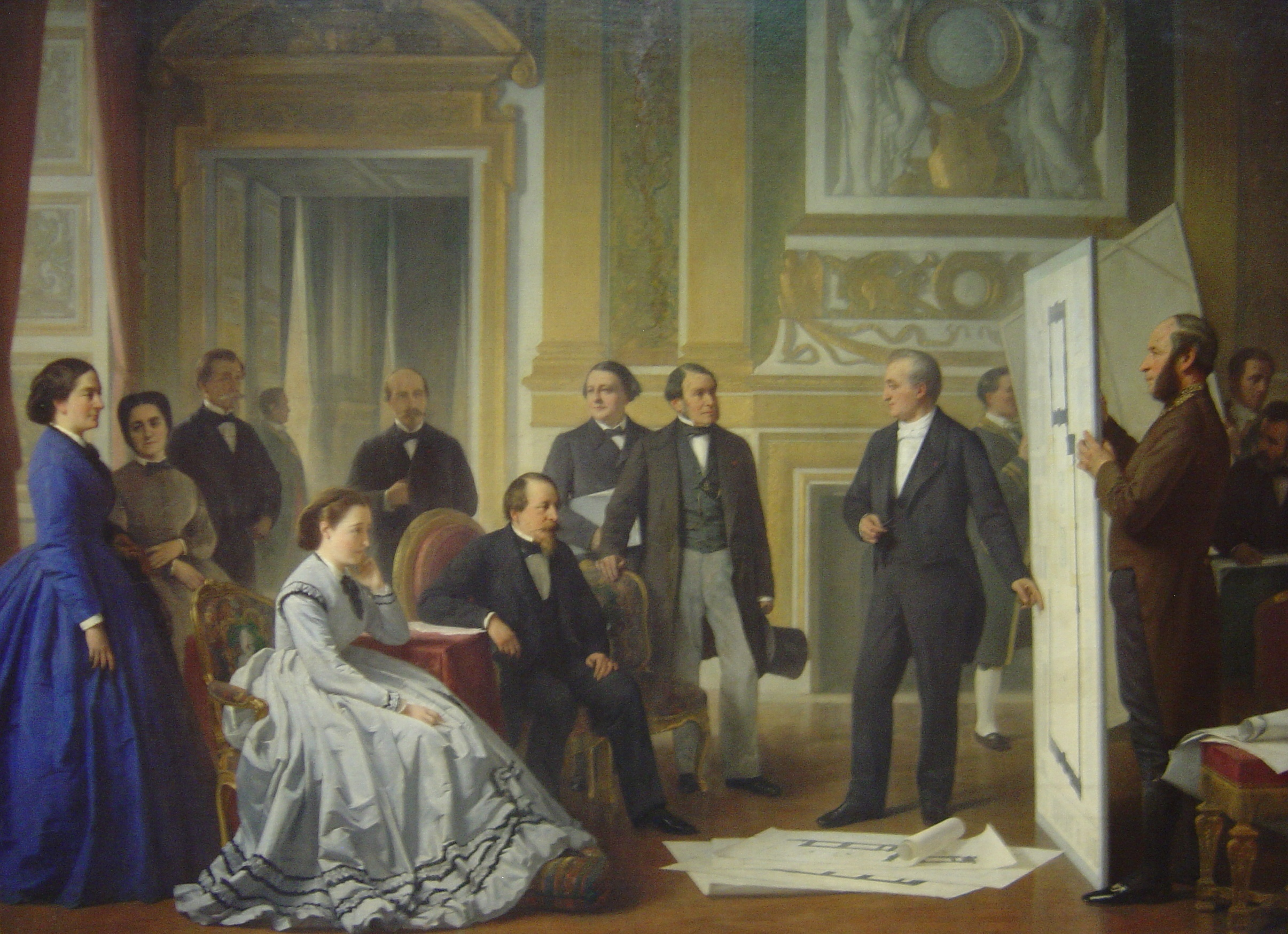
Visconti presents the plans for the Nouveau Louvre to Emperor Napoleon III and Empress Eugénie in 1853 at the Tuileries, painting by Jean-Baptiste-Ange Tissier (1865)

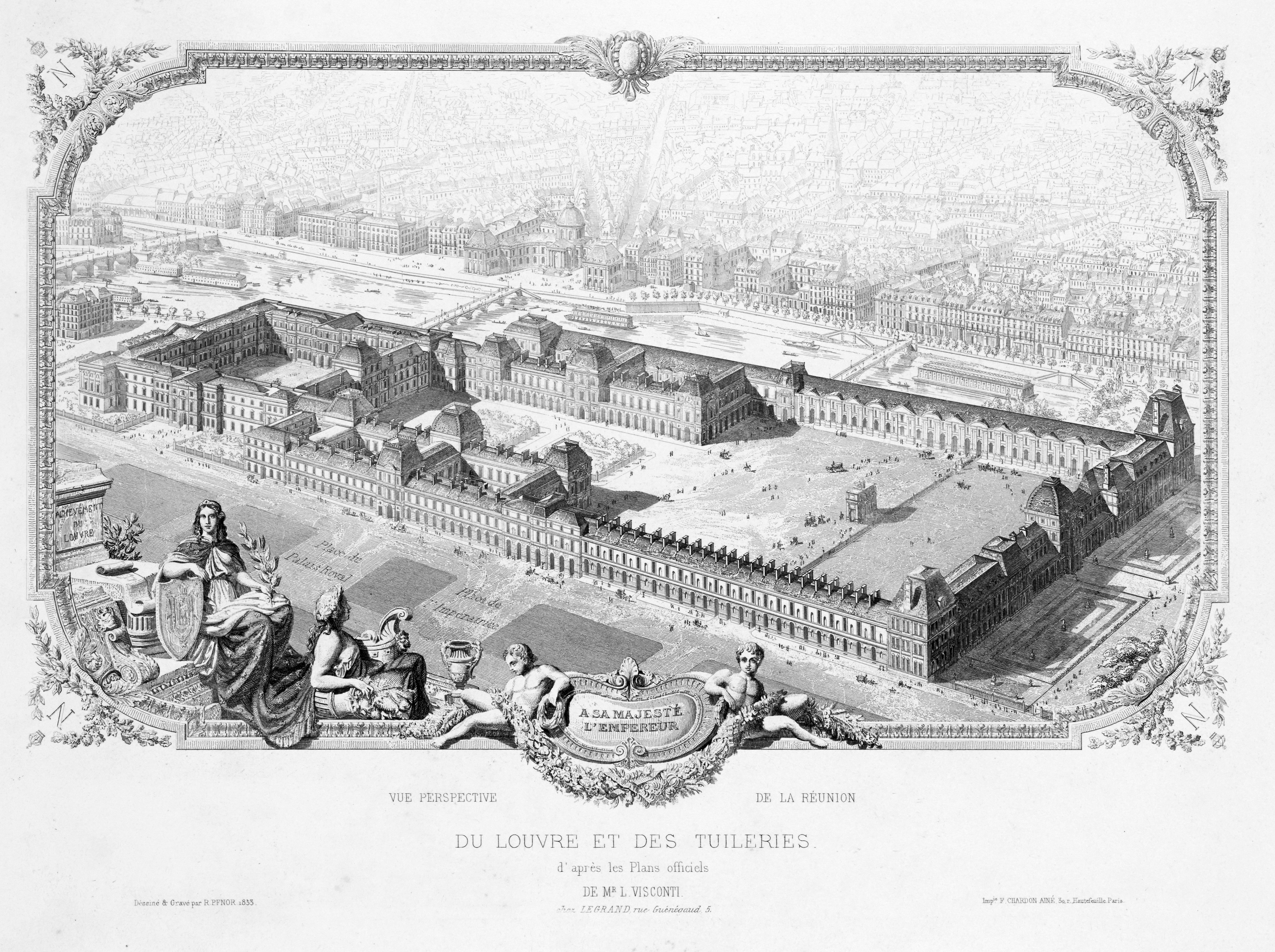
Engraving dedicated "to His Majesty the Emperor" showcasing Visconti's design, by Rudolf Pfnor (1853)

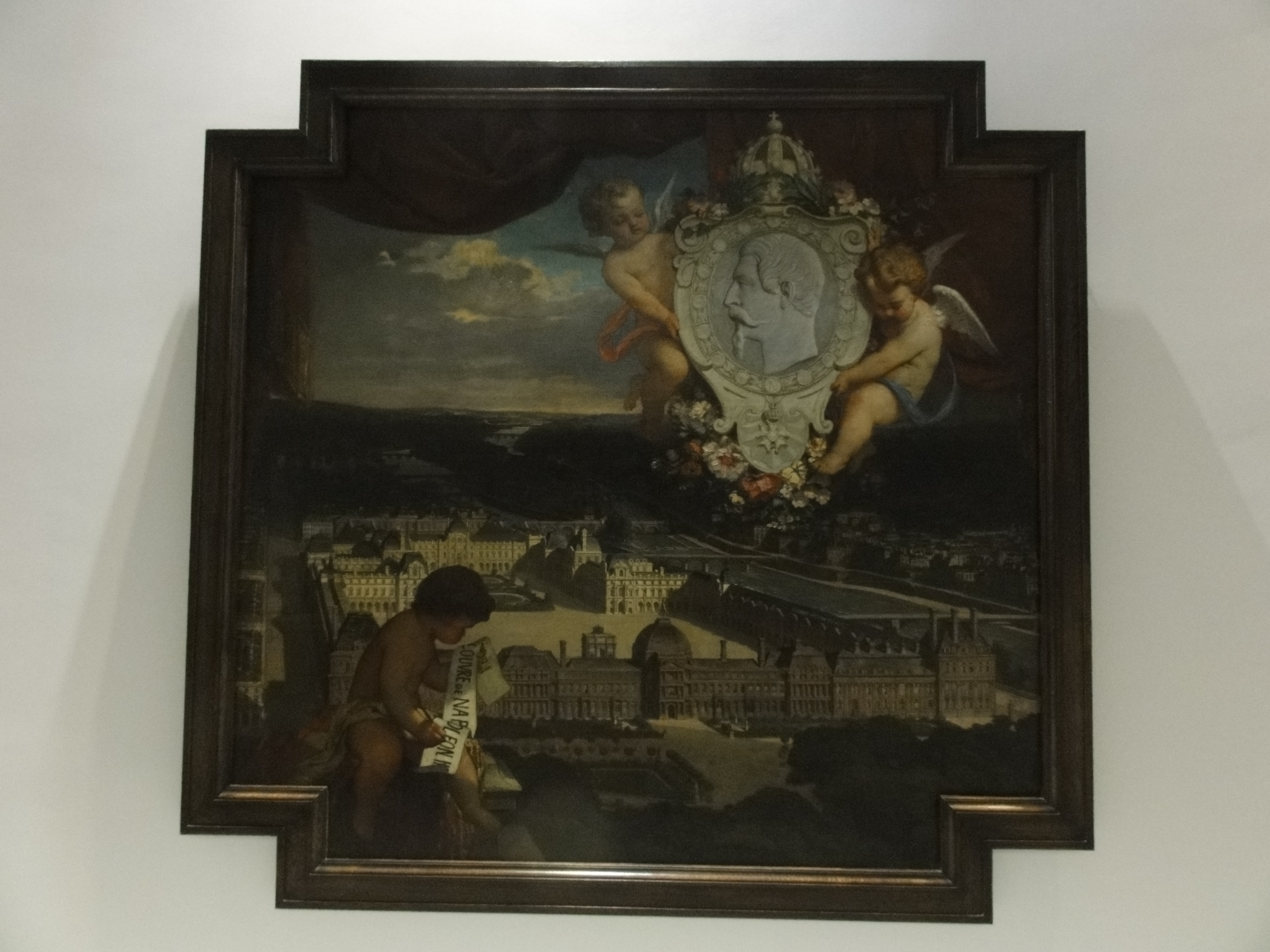
Celebratory tapestry cartoon showing the expanded Louvre between a cherub holding a ribbon inscribed with "LE LOUVRE DE NAPOLEON III" (lower left) and two angels holding the Emperor's profile (upper right), by Victor Chavet (1857); now at the Louvre

== Description ==
The Nouveau Louvre mostly consists of two sets of buildings or wings, on the northern and southern sides of the central space that is now called the Cour Napoléon. The new buildings were structured around a sequence of pavilions that were given names of French statesmen from the Ancien Régime (North Wing) and the Napoleonic era (South Wing), still used to this day: from the northwest to the southwest, pavillon Turgot, pavillon Richelieu, pavillon Colbert, pavillon Sully (the project's new name for the pre-existing pavillon de l'Horloge), pavillon Daru topping the eponymous staircase, pavillon Denon, and pavillon Mollien also featuring a monumental staircase. (From 1989, the names of the three central pavilions have also been given to the entire respective wings of the Louvre museum complex. Thus, the Louvre's North Wing is now known as aile Richelieu, its eastern square of buildings around the Cour Carrée is the aile Sully, and the South Wing is the aile Denon.)

Lefuel created two octagonal gardens at the center of the Cour Napoléon (now replaced by the Louvre Pyramid). In multiple parts of the project, Napoleon III emphasized his role as continuator of the great French monarchs of the past, and as the one who completed their unfinished work. On both sides of the Pavillon Sully, black marble plaques bear gilded inscriptions that read, respectively: "1541. François Ier commence le Louvre. 1564. Catherine de Médicis commence les Tuileries," and "1852–1857. Napoléon III réunit les Tuileries au Louvre." Separately, Napoleon III created a Musée des Souverains in the Louvre's Colonnade Wing to similarly emphasize the continuity of his rule with the long legacy of French monarchy and thus bolster his legitimacy.

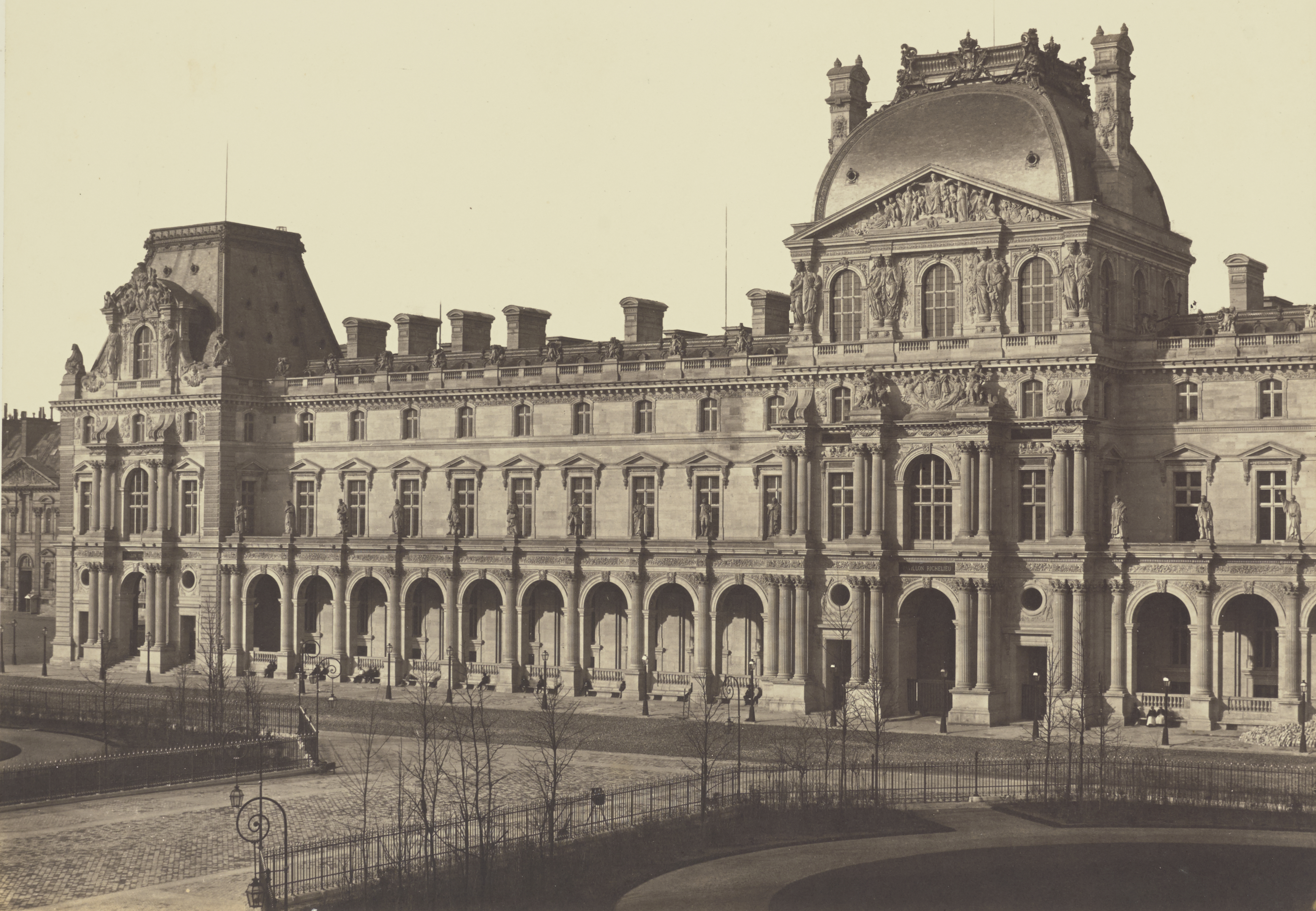
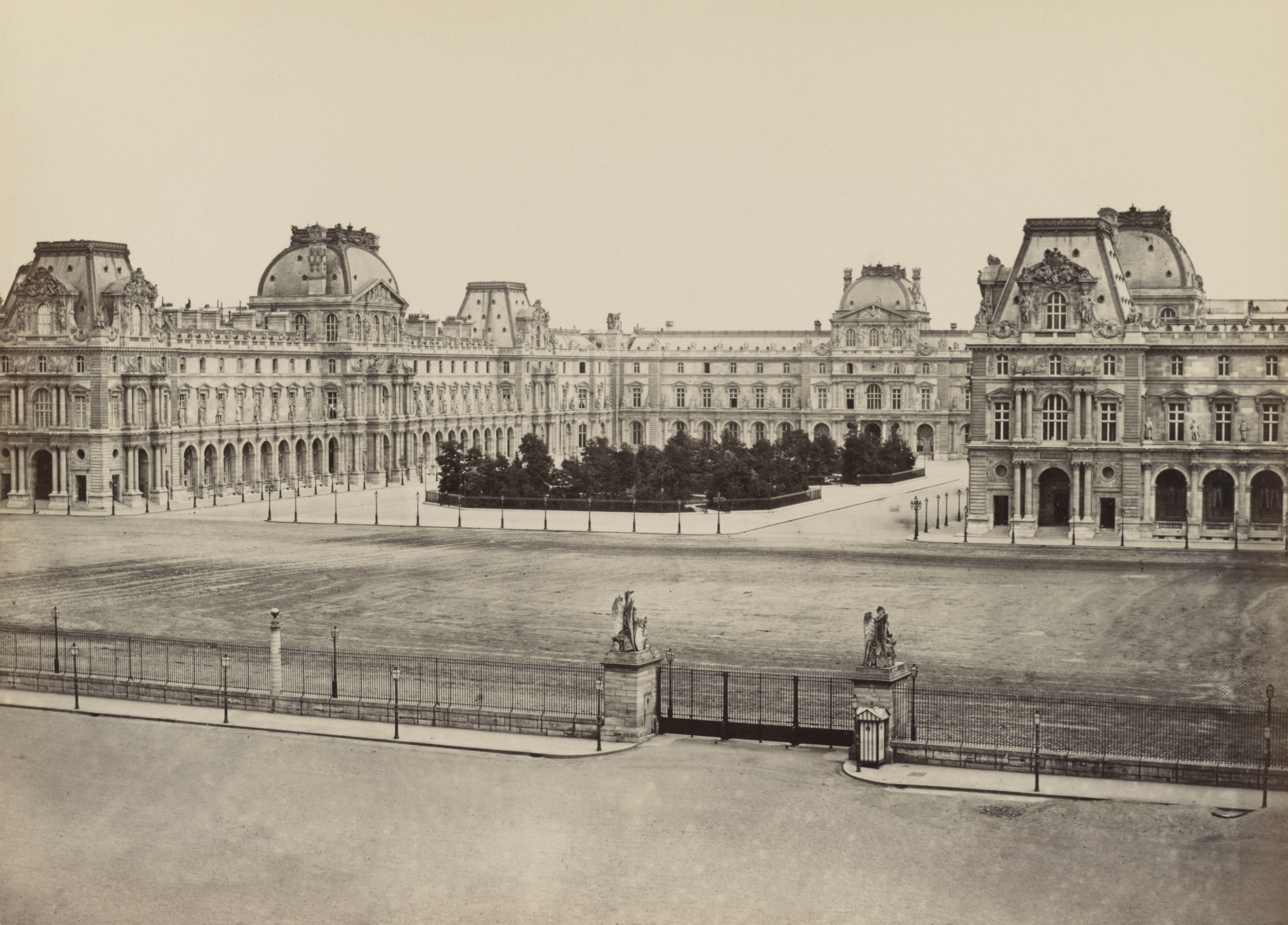
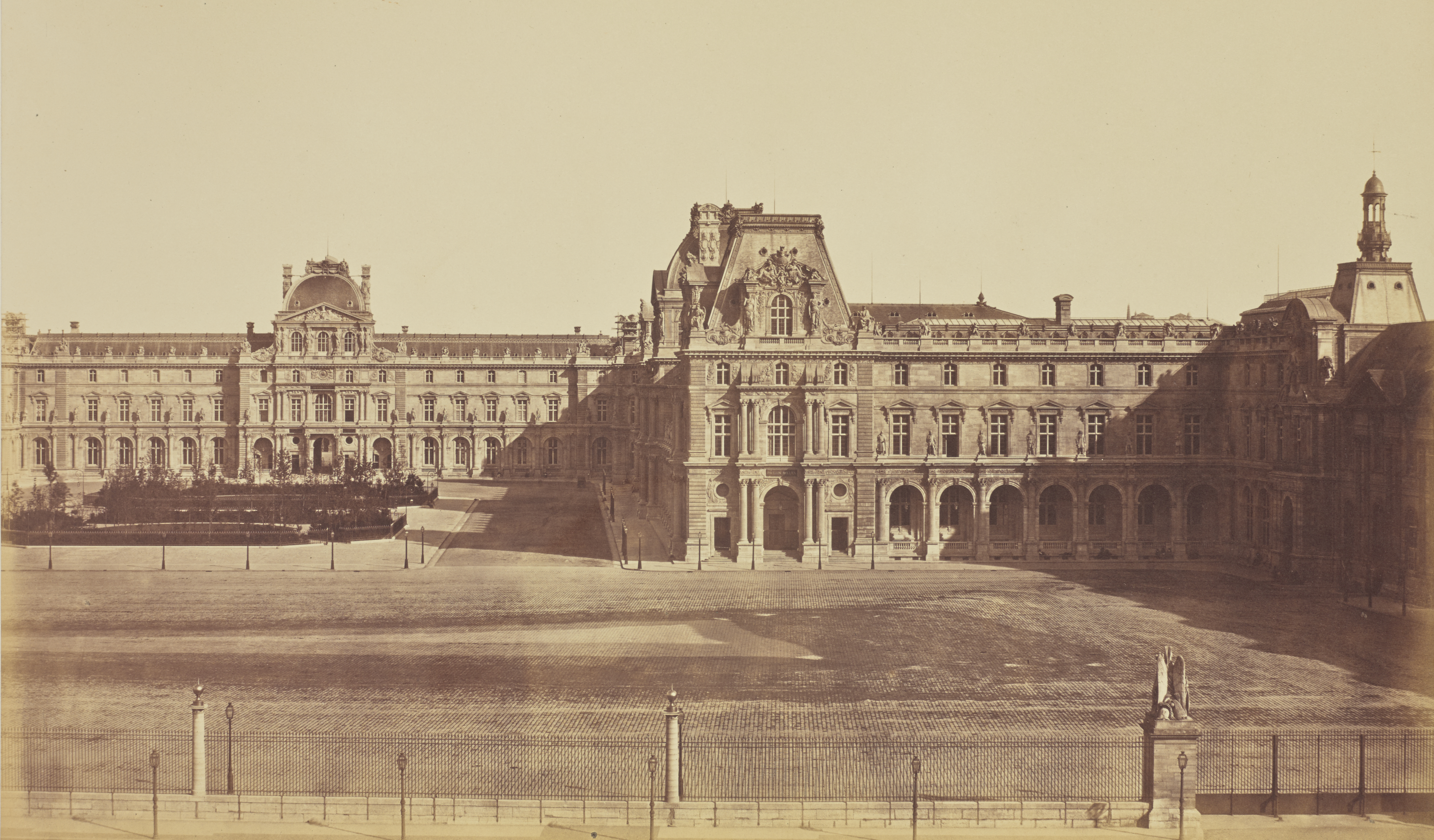
The Louvre expansion shortly after its completion, photographed by Édouard Baldus (late 1850s)

On the eastern side of the Cour Napoléon, the project entailed no new building but rather the exterior refacing of the pre-existing palace whose interior rooms were left unchanged. For the central pavillon de l'Horloge's new western façade, Visconti took inspiration from both its eastern side designed by Jacques Lemercier in the 1620s and from the central pavilion of the Tuileries Palace, itself influenced by Lemercier's. The same inspiration shaped the pavilions named after Richelieu and Denon on the Cour Napoléon's northern and southern sides. Lefuel transformed Visconti's understated original design and added a profusion of elaborate sculptural detail. Despite being criticized by a number of observers, e.g. by Ludovic Vitet, Prosper Mérimée and Horace de Viel-Castel, Lefuel's treatment of the square-dome-roofed pavilions became a seminal model for Second Empire architecture in France and elsewhere.

Inside the North Wing were prestige apartments for some of the regime's principal figures, including those of the Minister of State (long mistakenly attributed to the Duke of Morny and now known as the appartements Napoléon III), served by a monumental staircase later known as the escalier du ministre; administrative offices for the ministère d'Etat, the short-lived ministère de l'Algérie et des Colonies (1858–1860), the ministère de la Maison de l'Empereur (separated from the ministère d'Etat in 1860), and (briefly) the ministère des Beaux-Arts created in early 1870; the Directorate of Telegraphs; barracks for the Imperial Guard; and the Bibliothèque du Louvre (formerly bibliothèque impériale under Napoleon and bibliothèque du Cabinet du Roi under the Restoration), personal property of the emperor but open to the public, on the upper floor between the Pavillon Richelieu and the rue de Rivoli. The latter was acceded by the monumental escalier de la Bibliothèque (known since the late 19th century as escalier Lefuel), with sculpted decoration by Lefuel's friend Marie-Noémi Cadiot. Initial plans to locate the Minister of the Interior in the North Wing's eastern half were abandoned in the late 1850s.

The South Wing was largely devoted to a series of new spaces for the Louvre Museum that were dubbed the Nouveau Musée Impérial. These included, on the upper ground floor, a new entrance lobby flanked by two long stone-clad galleries, respectively named after Napoleon's ministers Pierre Daru (Galerie Daru) and Nicolas François, Count Mollien (Galerie Mollien), with the monumental staircases bearing those same names at both ends; and on the first floor, high-ceilinged exhibition rooms for large paintings, the Salle Daru and salle Mollien, with the Pavillon Denon in the middle, whose lavish interior decoration was completed in 1866. On the same floor, between the Pavillon Denon and the Grande Galerie, Lefuel created a large Estates Hall (Salle des États) for state events and ceremonies.

Below these prestige spaces was an extensive complex of stables for up to 149 horses and 34 carriages. At the center of it is the brick-and-stone salle du Manège, a monumental indoor space for horse-riding under the Salle des États, between two interior courts named after Caulaincourt (west) and Visconti (east). (The cour Caulaincourt was renamed after Lefuel following the architect's death in 1880.) The stables were nominally supervised by Great Equerry (grand écuyer) Émile Félix Fleury, whose spacious apartment was on the western side of the Cour Lefuel and adorned with a porticoed balcony. The South wing also included barracks for the Cent-gardes Squadron and lodgings for the palace's service personnel.

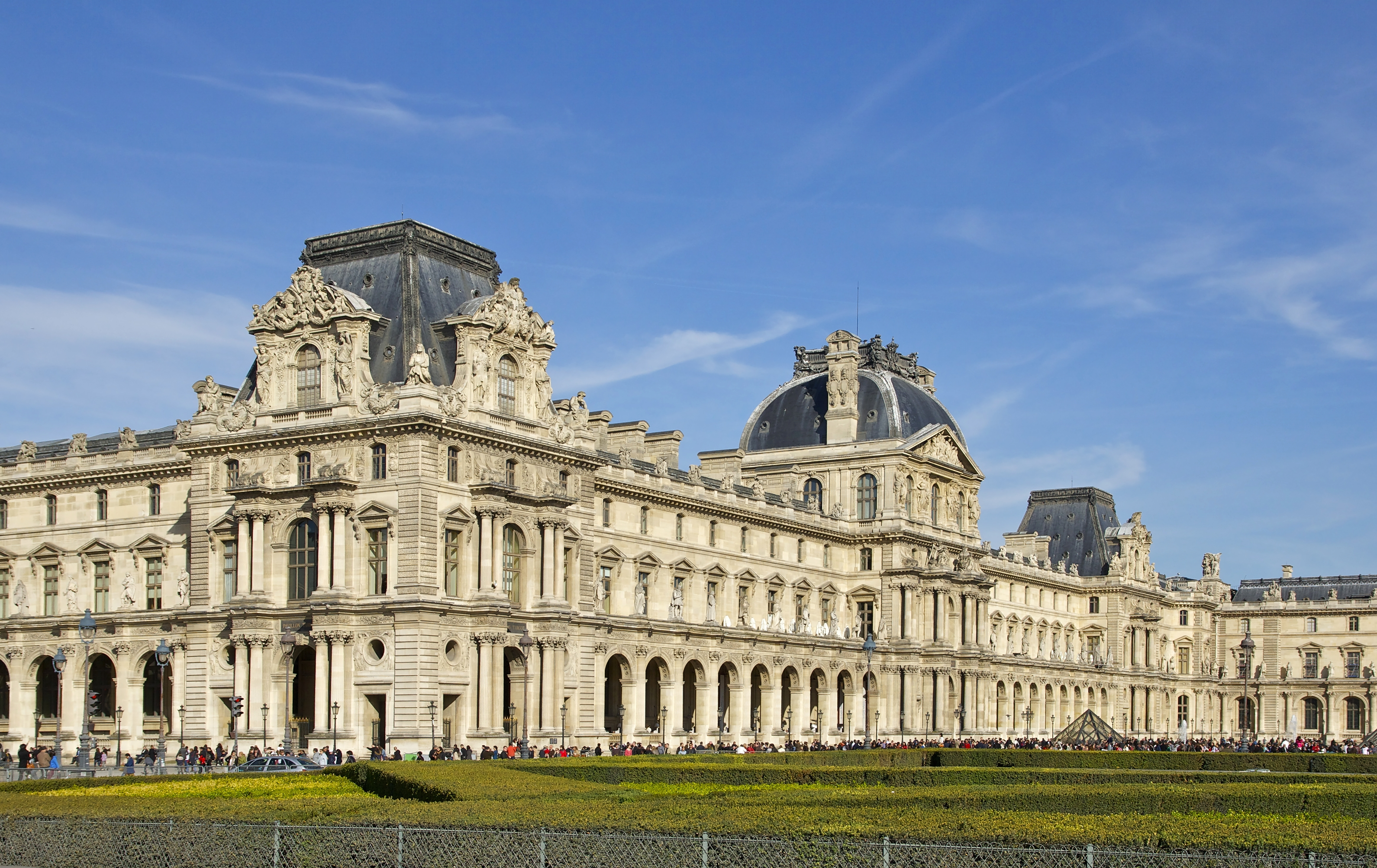
North Wing

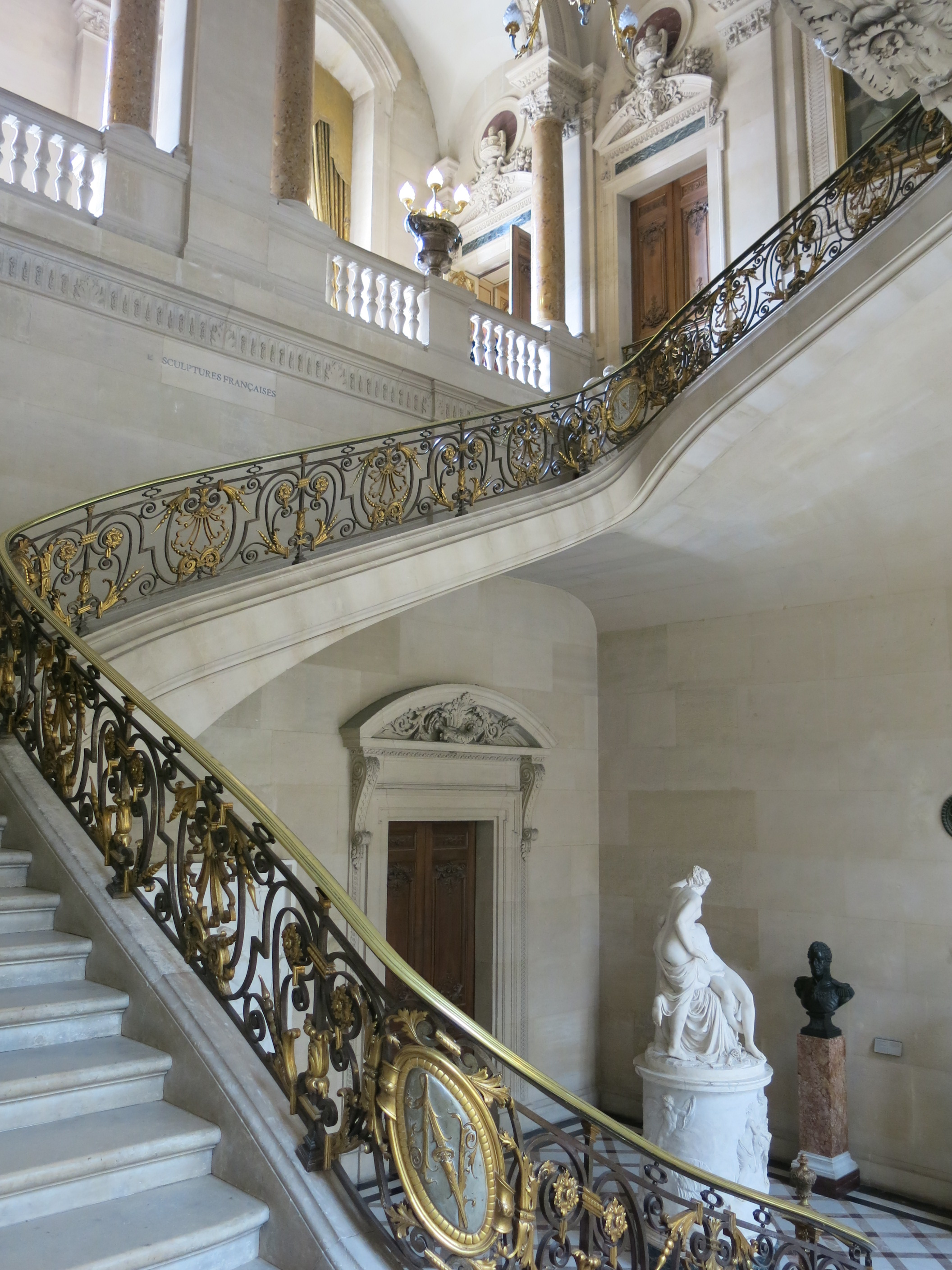
Escalier du Ministre

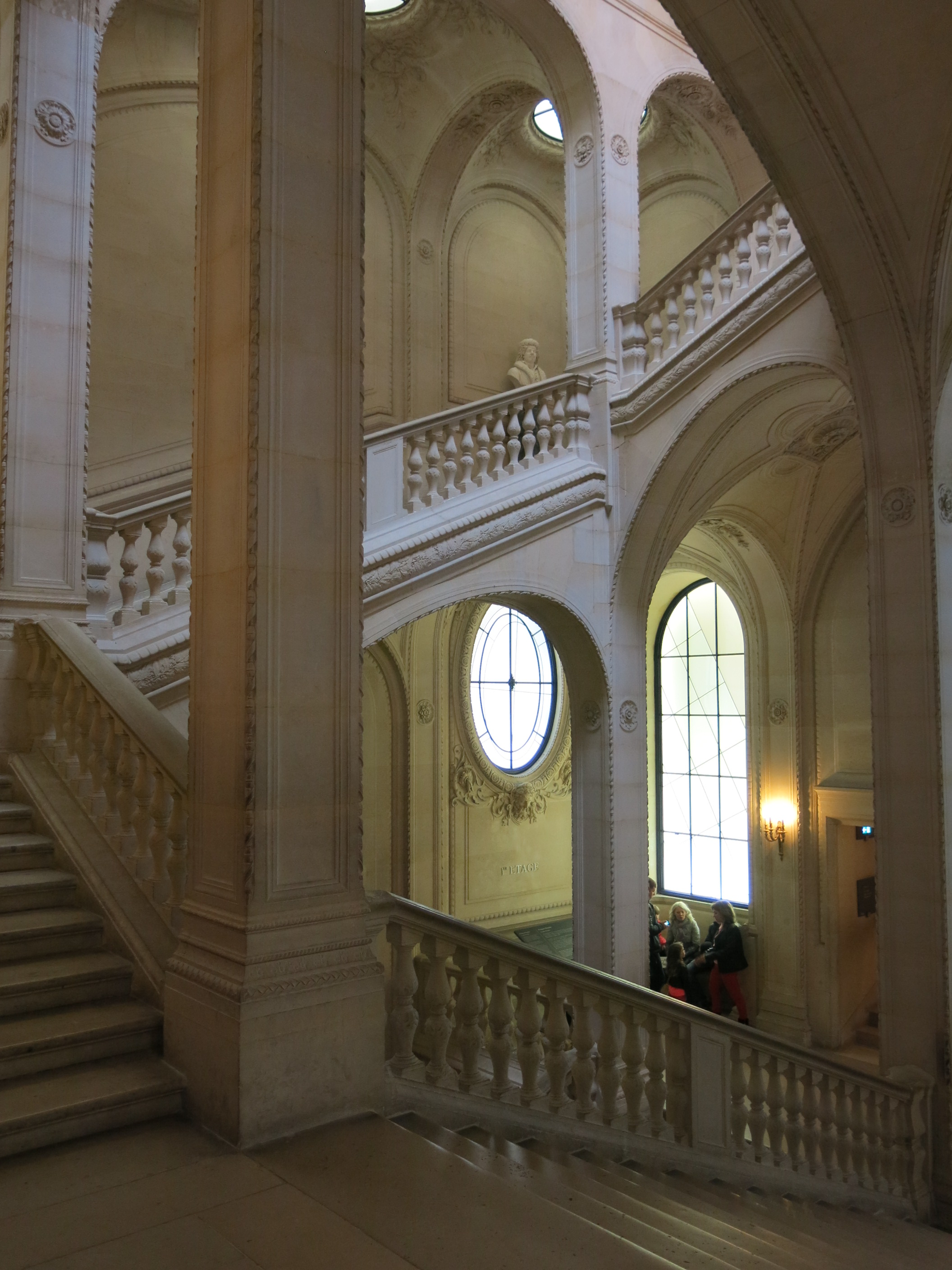
Escalier Lefuel

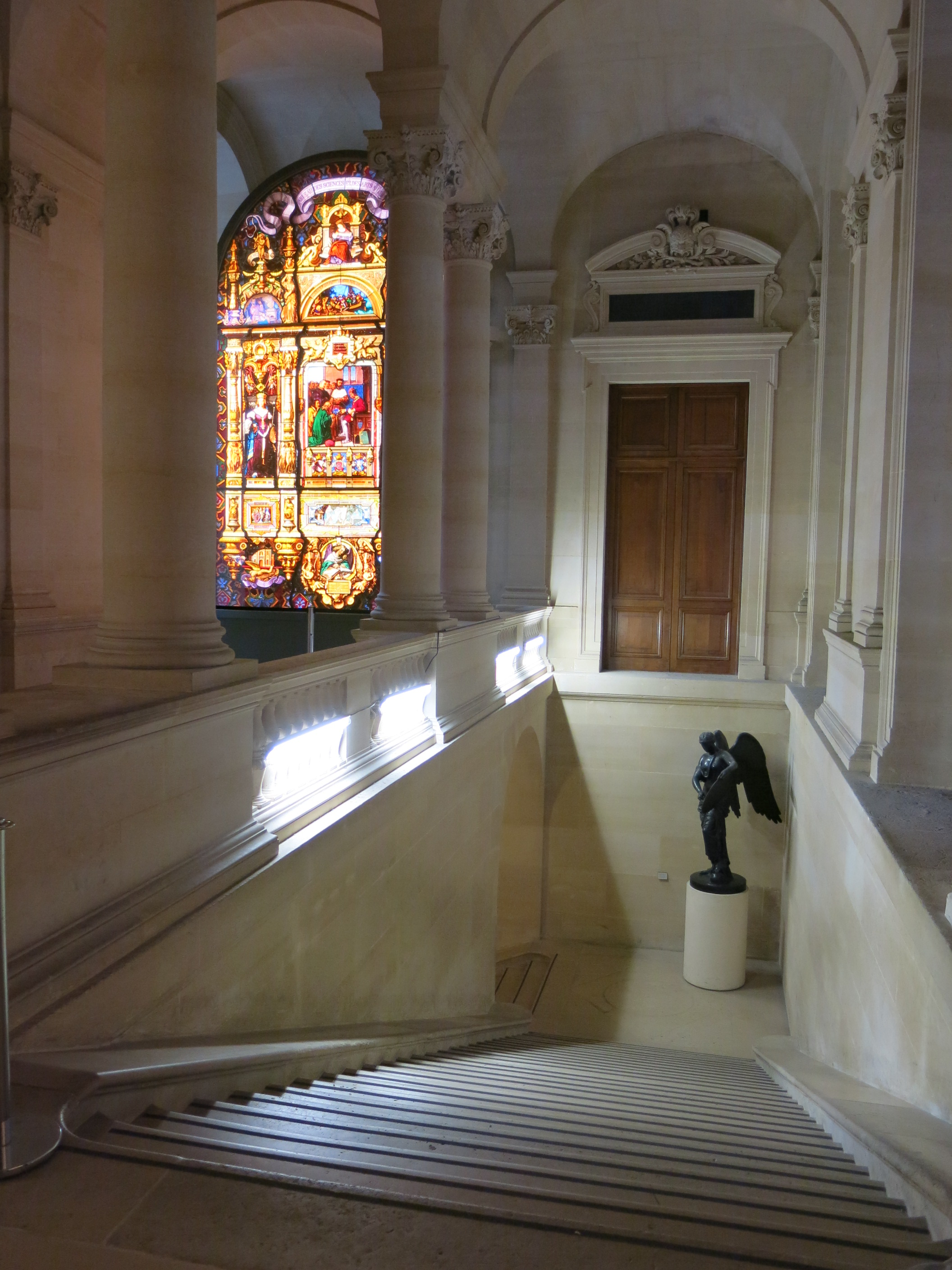
Escalier Colbert

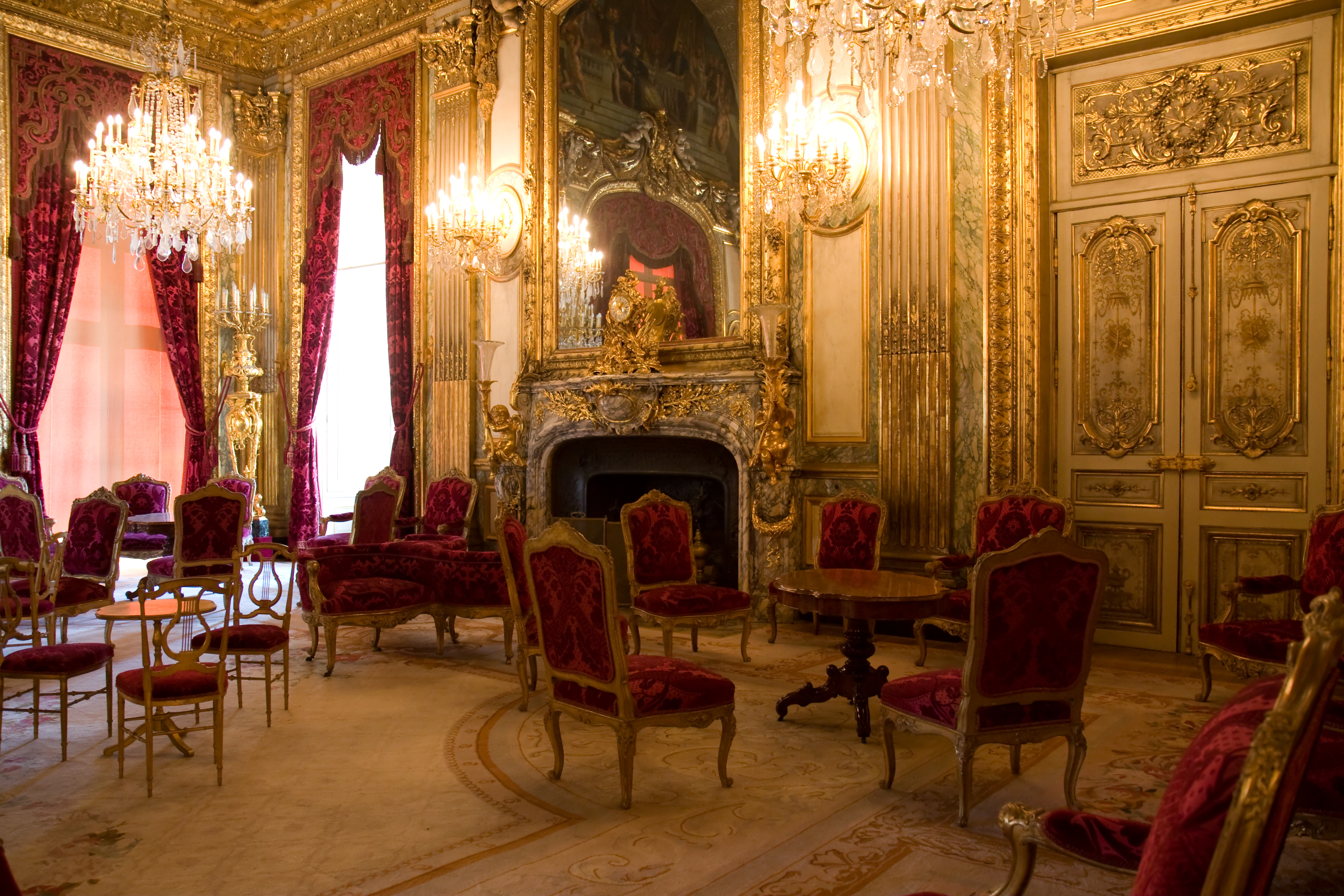
Appartements Napoléon III

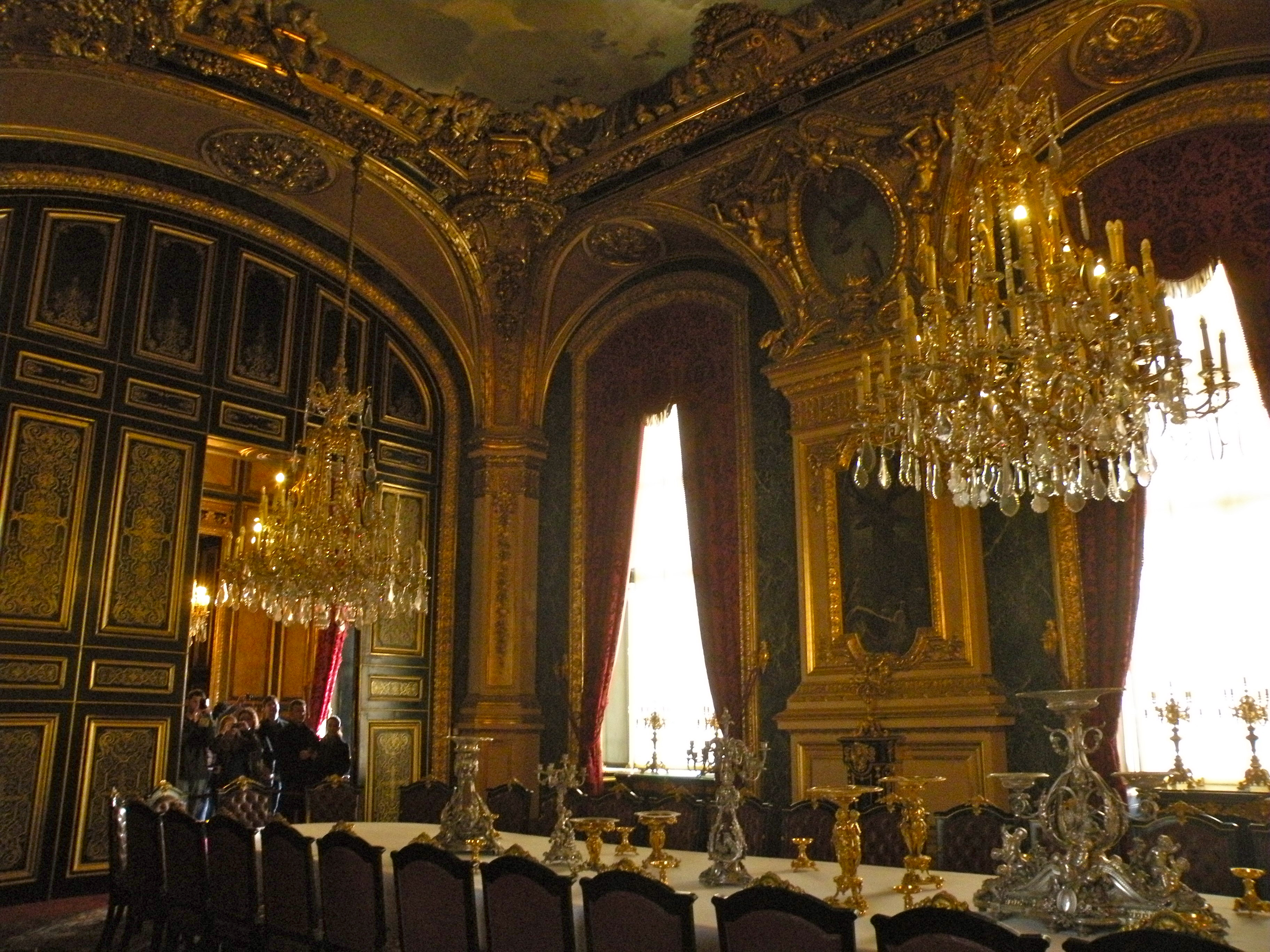
Appartements Napoléon III

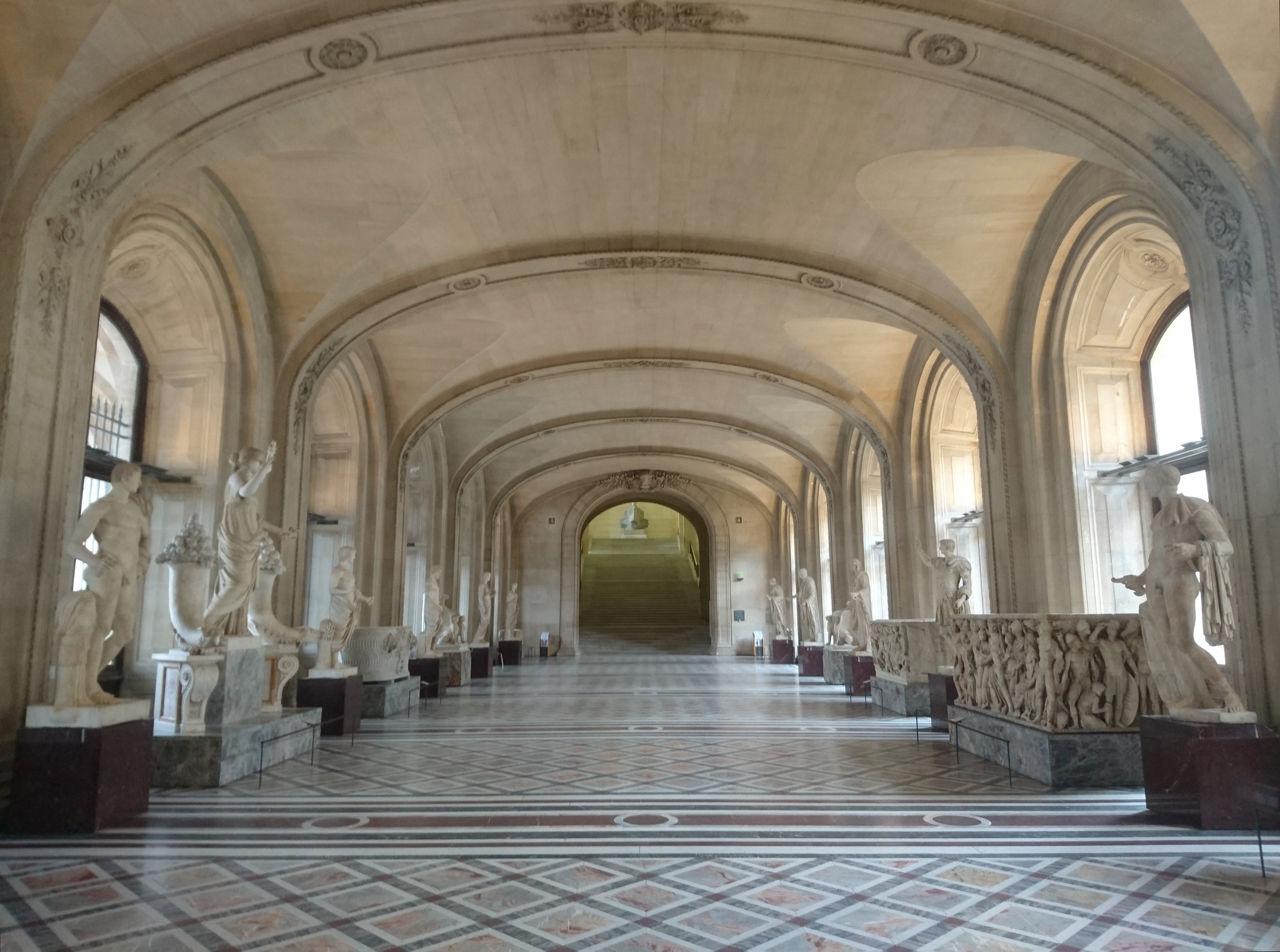
Galerie Daru

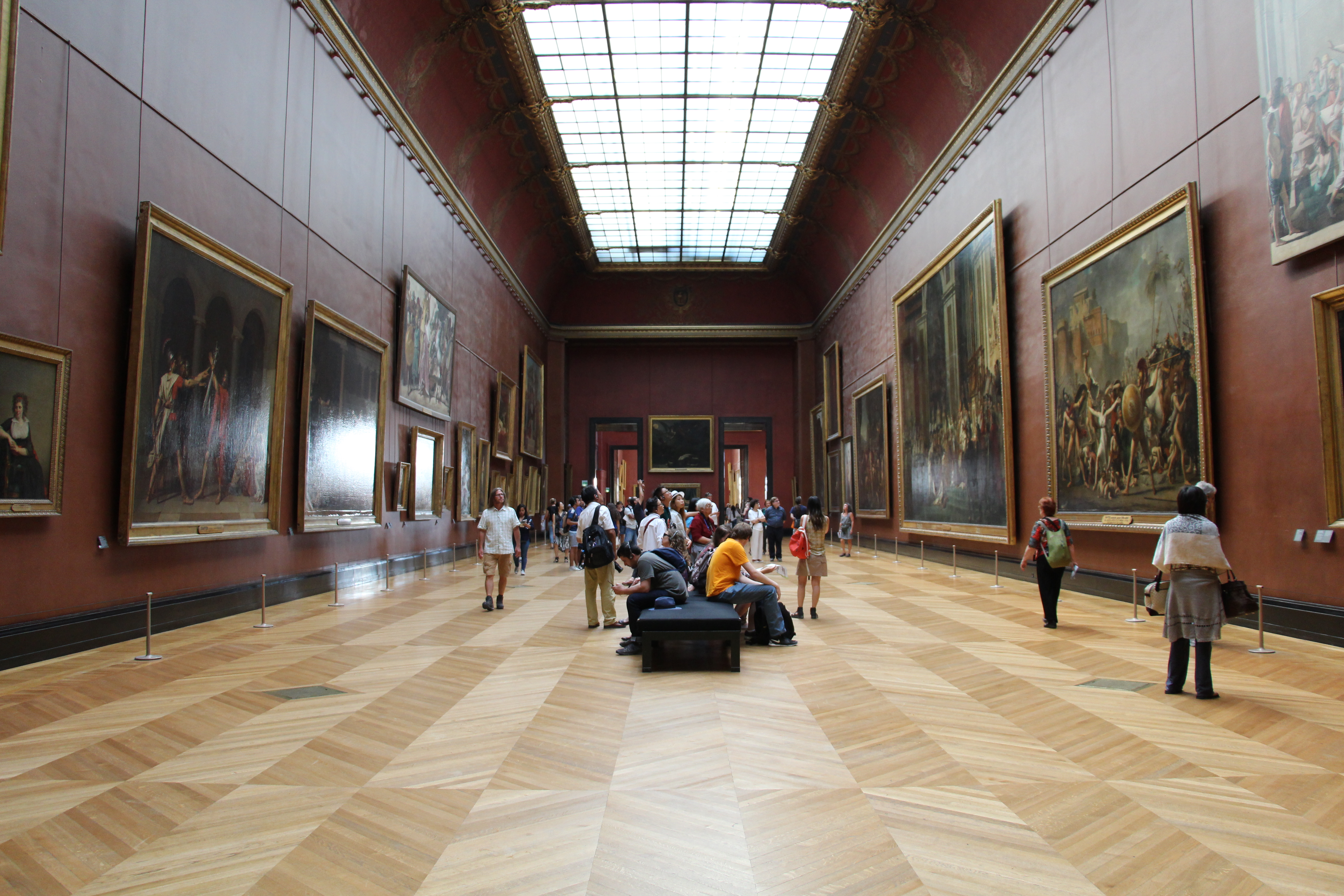
Salle Daru

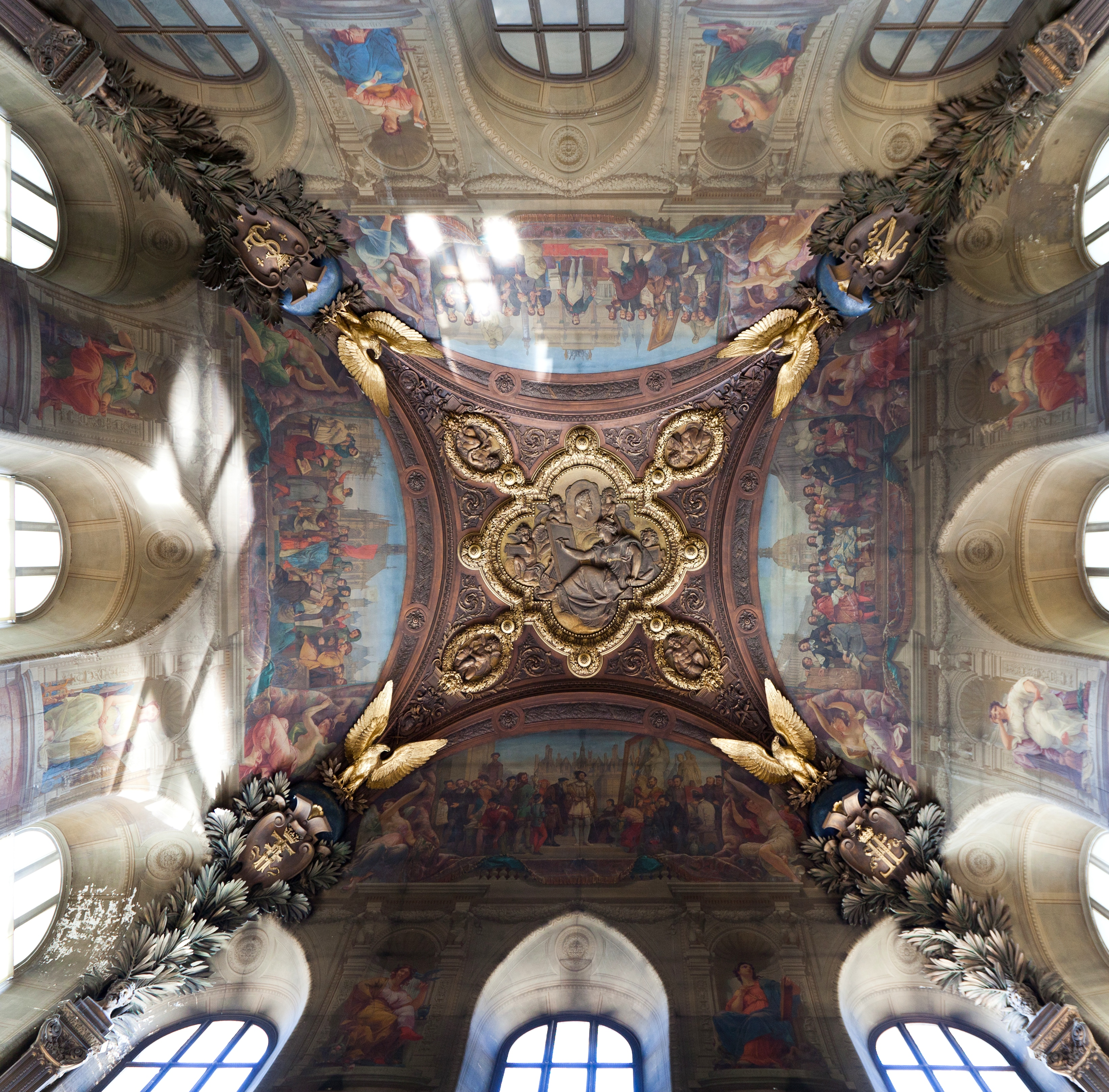
Pavillon Denon ceiling

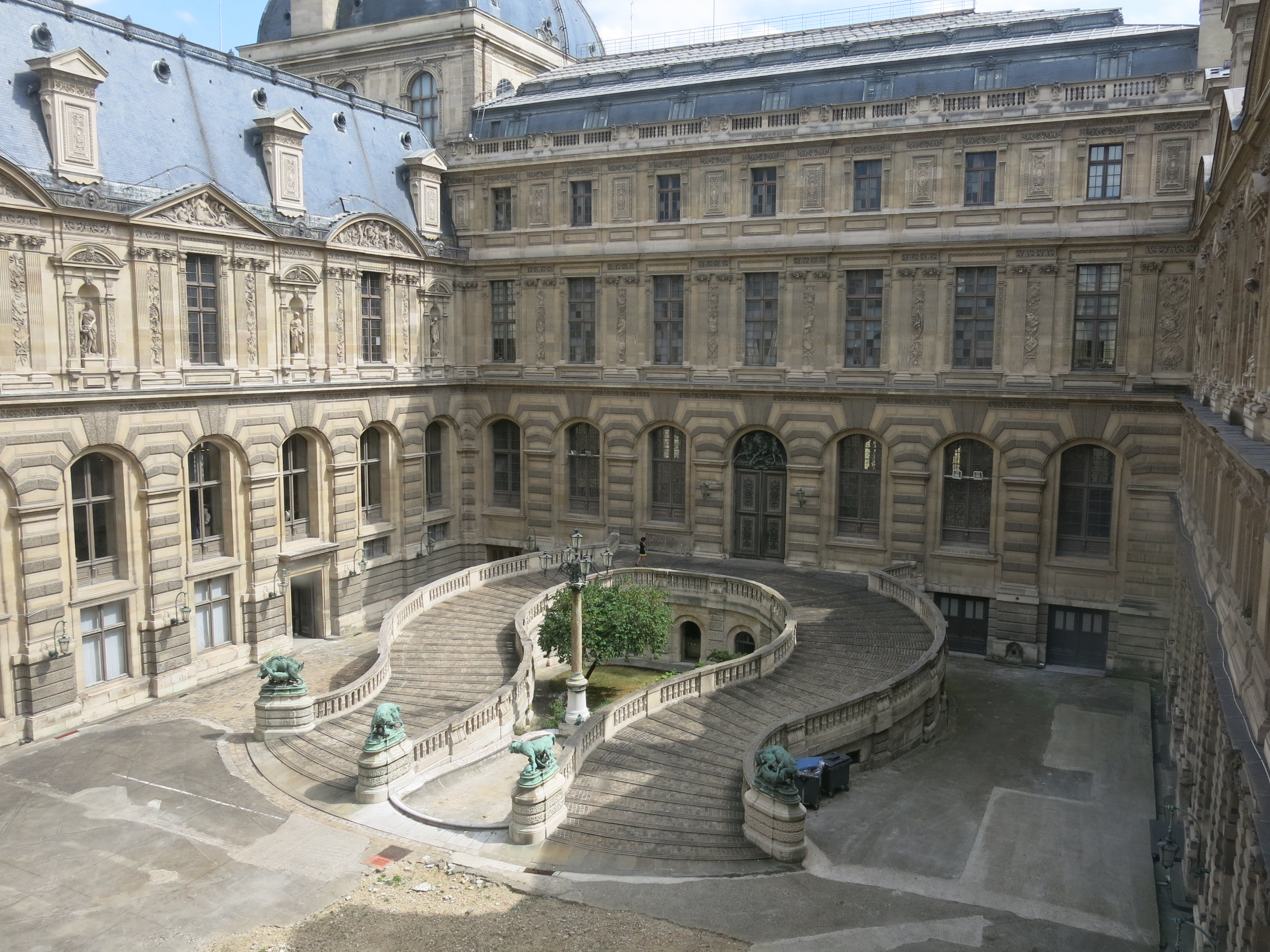
Cour Lefuel with ramps to the salle du Manège

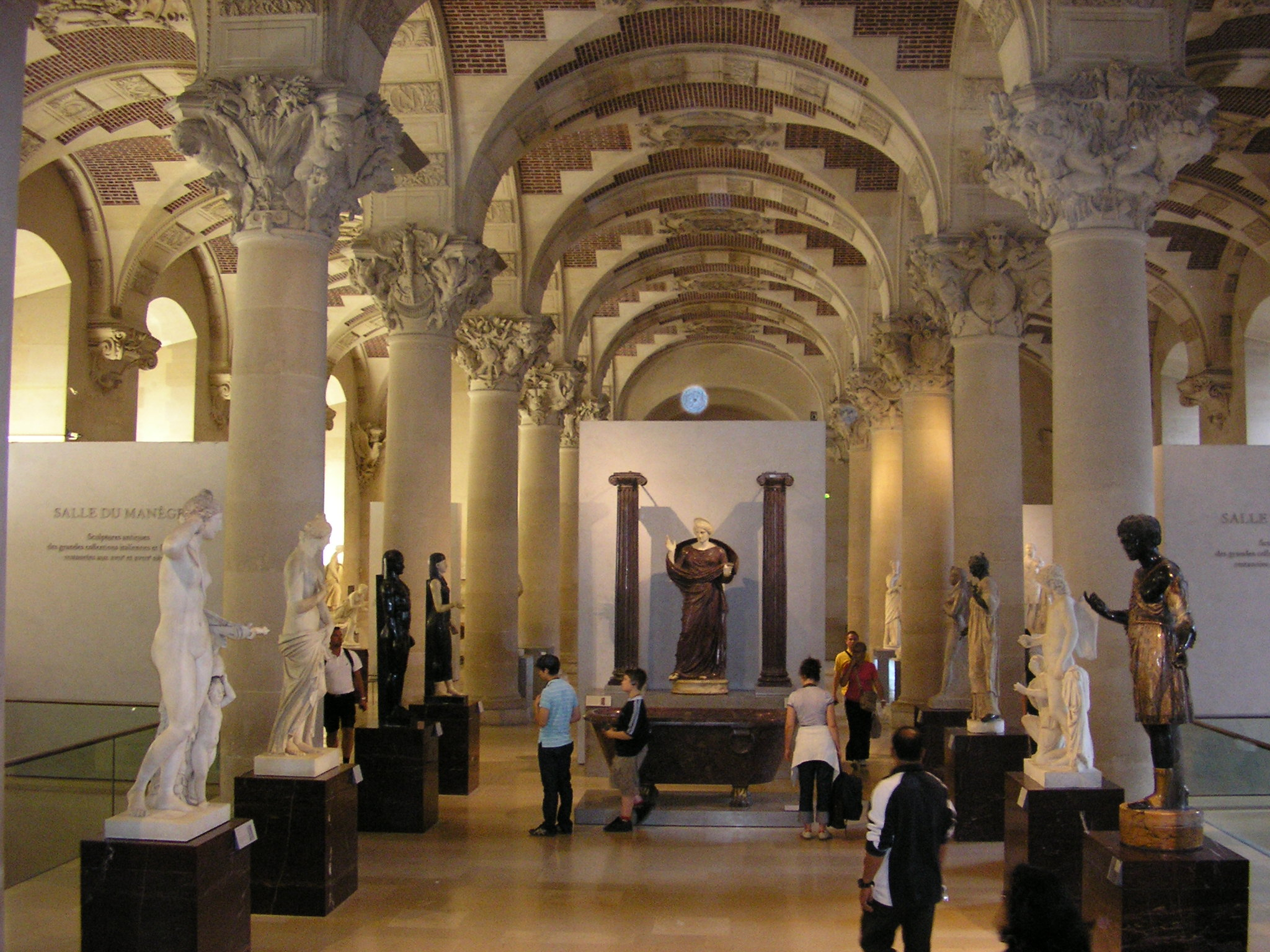
Interior of the salle du Manège

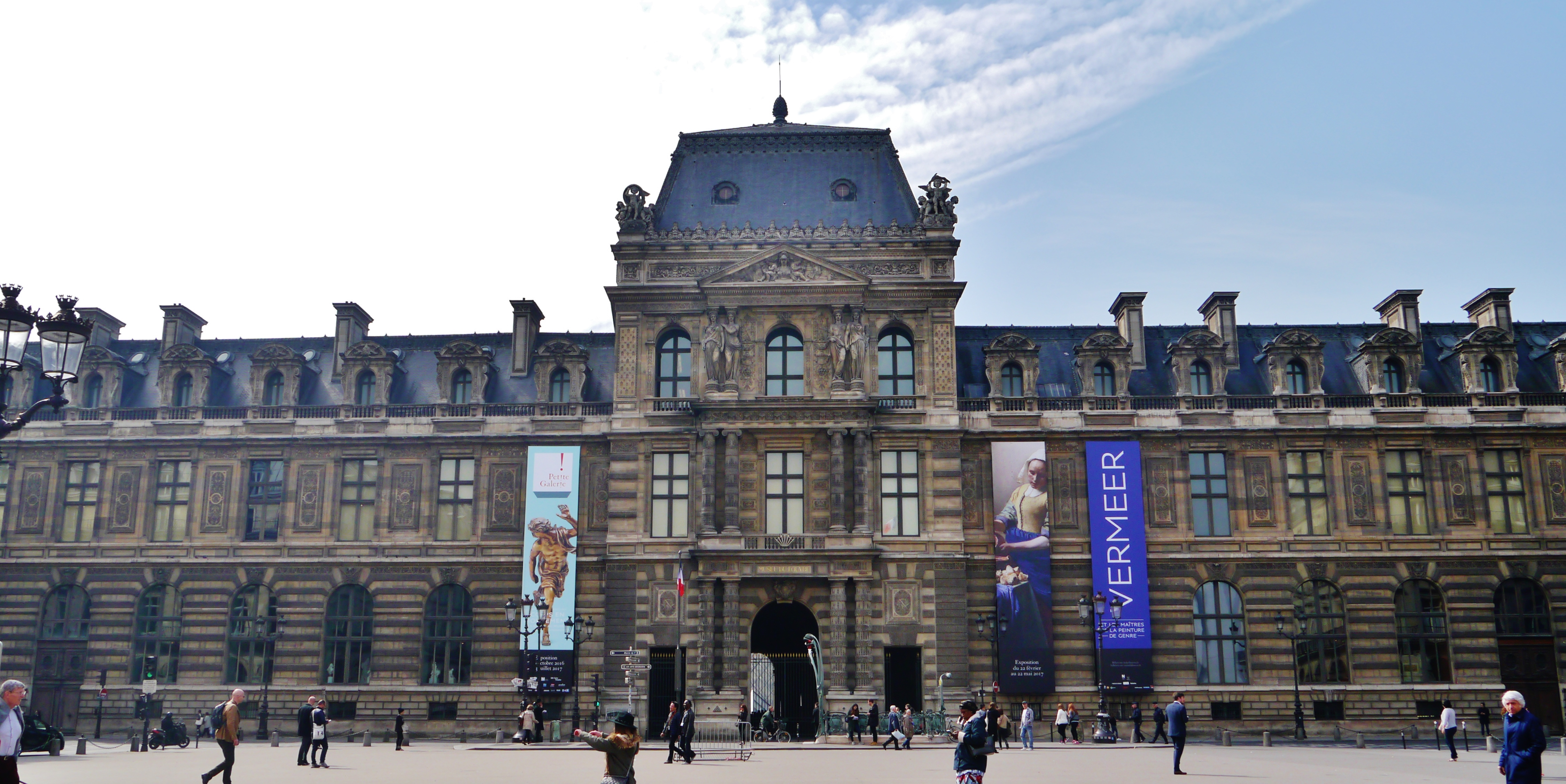
Pavillon de la Bibliothèque on the rue de Rivoli

== Statuary ==
Plan of the Louvre with the 86 hommes illustres marked in red

Initially, Visconti's plan was to erect equestrian statues of Louis XIV and Napoleon I at the center of the Cour Napoléon's two octagonal gardens, and another one of Francis I in the Cour Carrée. This was ostensibly intended to emphasize his claim to legitimacy as the inheritor of France's two (royal and imperial) strands of monarchical development. This program, however, was not realized.

Nevertheless, sculptural profusion was one of the defining features of Lefuel's approach. Arguably the most salient component is the series of 86 statues of celebrated figures (hommes illustres) from French history and culture, selected by Napoleon III himself, each one labelled with their name. These include, following the order of the wings from northwest to southwest:

- North Wing, western side: Jean de La Fontaine, by Jean-Louis Jaley; Blaise Pascal, by François Lanno; François Eudes de Mézeray, by Louis-Joseph Daumas; Molière, by Bernard Seurre; Nicolas Boileau-Despréaux, by Charles Émile Seurre; François Fénelon, by Jean-Marie Bonnassieux; François de La Rochefoucauld, by Noël-Jules Girard; and Pierre Corneille, by Philippe Joseph Henri Lemaire.
- North Wing, southern side: Gregory of Tours, by Jean Marcellin; François Rabelais, by Élias Robert (now a copy); François de Malherbe, by Jean-Jules Allasseur; Peter Abelard, by Pierre-Jules Cavelier; Jean-Baptiste Colbert, by Raymond Gayrard (copy); Cardinal Mazarin, by Pierre Hébert; Georges-Louis Leclerc, Comte de Buffon, by Eugène André Oudiné; Jean Froissart, by Philippe Joseph Henri Lemaire; Jean-Jacques Rousseau, by Jean-Baptiste Farochon; Montesquieu, by Charles-François Lebœuf; Mathieu Molé, by Charles-François Lebœuf; Anne Robert Jacques Turgot, by Pierre Travaux; Bernard of Clairvaux, by François Jouffroy; Jean de La Bruyère, by Joseph-Stanislas Lescorné; Suger, by Nicolas Raggi; Jacques Auguste de Thou, by Auguste-Louis Deligand; Louis Bourdaloue, by Louis Desprez; Jean Racine, by Michel-Pascal; Voltaire, by Antoine Desboeufs; Jacques-Bénigne Bossuet, by Louis Desprez; Marquis de Condorcet, by Pierre Loison; Denis Papin, by Jean-François Soitoux; Maximilien de Béthune, Duke of Sully, by Vital-Dubray (copy); Sébastien Le Prestre de Vauban, by Gustave Crauck; Antoine Lavoisier, by Jacques-Léonard Maillet; and Jérôme Lalande, by Jean-Joseph Perraud

. * Eastern side of the Cour Napoléon: François-Michel le Tellier, Marquis de Louvois, by Aimé Millet; Louis de Rouvroy, duc de Saint-Simon, by Pierre Hébert; Jean de Joinville, by Jean Marcellin; Esprit Fléchier, by François Lanno; Philippe de Commines, by Eugène-Louis Lequesne; Jacques Amyot, by Pierre Travaux; Pierre Mignard, by Debay fils; Jean Baptiste Massillon, by François Jouffroy; Jacques I Androuet du Cerceau, by Georges Diebolt; Jean Goujon, by Bernard Seurre; Claude Lorrain, by Auguste-Hyacinthe Debay; André Grétry, by Victor Vilain; Jean-François Regnard, by Théodore-Charles Gruyère; Jacques Cœur, by Élias Robert; Enguerrand de Marigny, by Nicolas Raggi; André Chénier, by Antoine-Augustin Préault; Jean-Balthazar Keller, by Pierre Robinet; and Antoine Coysevox, by Jules-Antoine Droz.

- South Wing, northern side: Jean Cousin the Younger, by Napoléon Jacques; André Le Nôtre, by Jean-Auguste Barre; Clodion, by Vital-Dubray; Germain Pilon, by Louis Desprez; Ange-Jacques Gabriel, by Augustin Courtet; Jean Le Pautre, by Bosio the Younger; Michel de l'Hôpital, by Jean-Baptiste Claude Eugène Guillaume; Jacques Lemercier, by Antoine Laurent Dantan; René Descartes, by Gabriel Garraud; Ambroise Paré, by Michel-Pascal; Cardinal Richelieu, by Jean-Auguste Barre; Michel de Montaigne, by Jean-François Soitoux; Jean-Antoine Houdon, by François Rude (copy); Étienne Dupérac, by Jacques Ange Cordier; Jean de Brosse, by Auguste Ottin; César-François Cassini de Thury, by Hippolyte Maindron; Henri François d'Aguesseau, by Louis-Denis Caillouette; Jules Hardouin-Mansart, by Jean-Joseph Perraud; Nicolas Poussin, by François Rude (copy); Gérard Audran, by Jacques-Léonard Maillet; Jacques Sarazin, by Honoré-Jean-Aristide Husson; Nicolas Coustou, by Augustin Courtet; Eustache Le Sueur, by Honoré-Jean-Aristide Husson; Claude Perrault, by Auguste-Hyacinthe Debay; Philippe de Champaigne, by Louis-Adolphe Eude; and Pierre Puget, by Antoine Étex.
- South Wing, western side: Pierre Lescot, by Henri de Triqueti; Jean Bullant, by Pierre Robinet; Charles Le Brun, by Jean-Claude Petit; Pierre Chambiges, by Jules-Antoine Droz; Libéral Bruand, by Armand Toussaint; Philibert de l'Orme, by Jean-Pierre Dantan; Bernard Palissy, by Victor Huguenin; and Hyacinthe Rigaud, by Victor Thérasse.
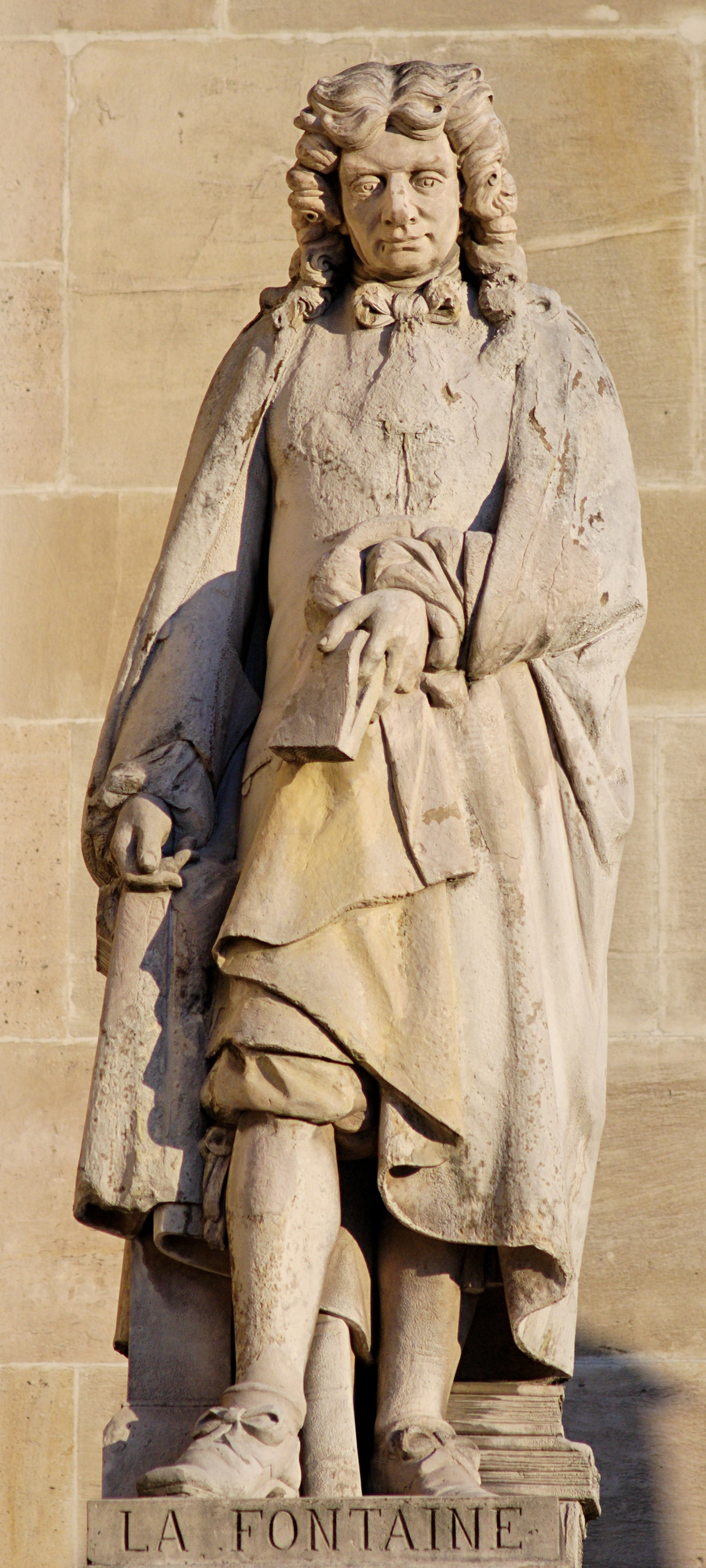

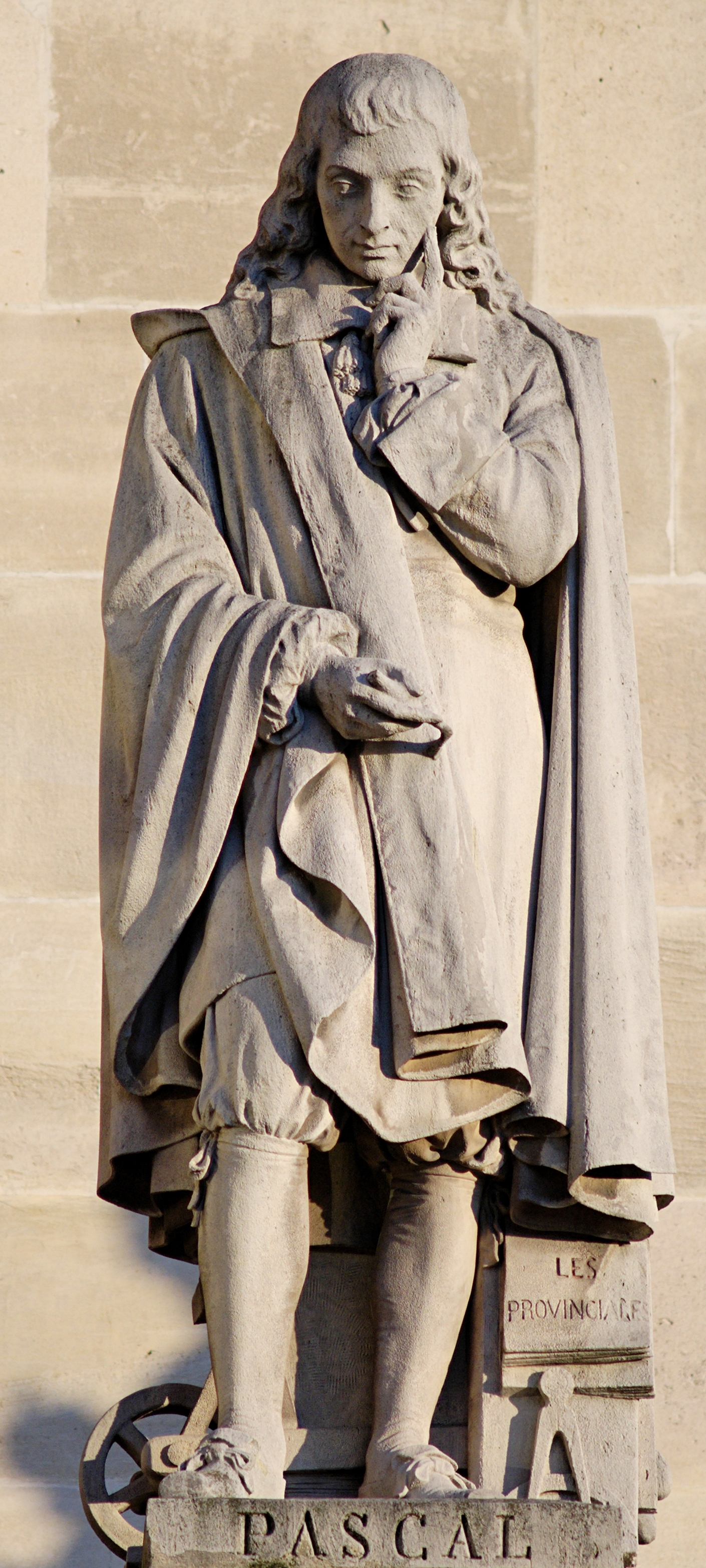

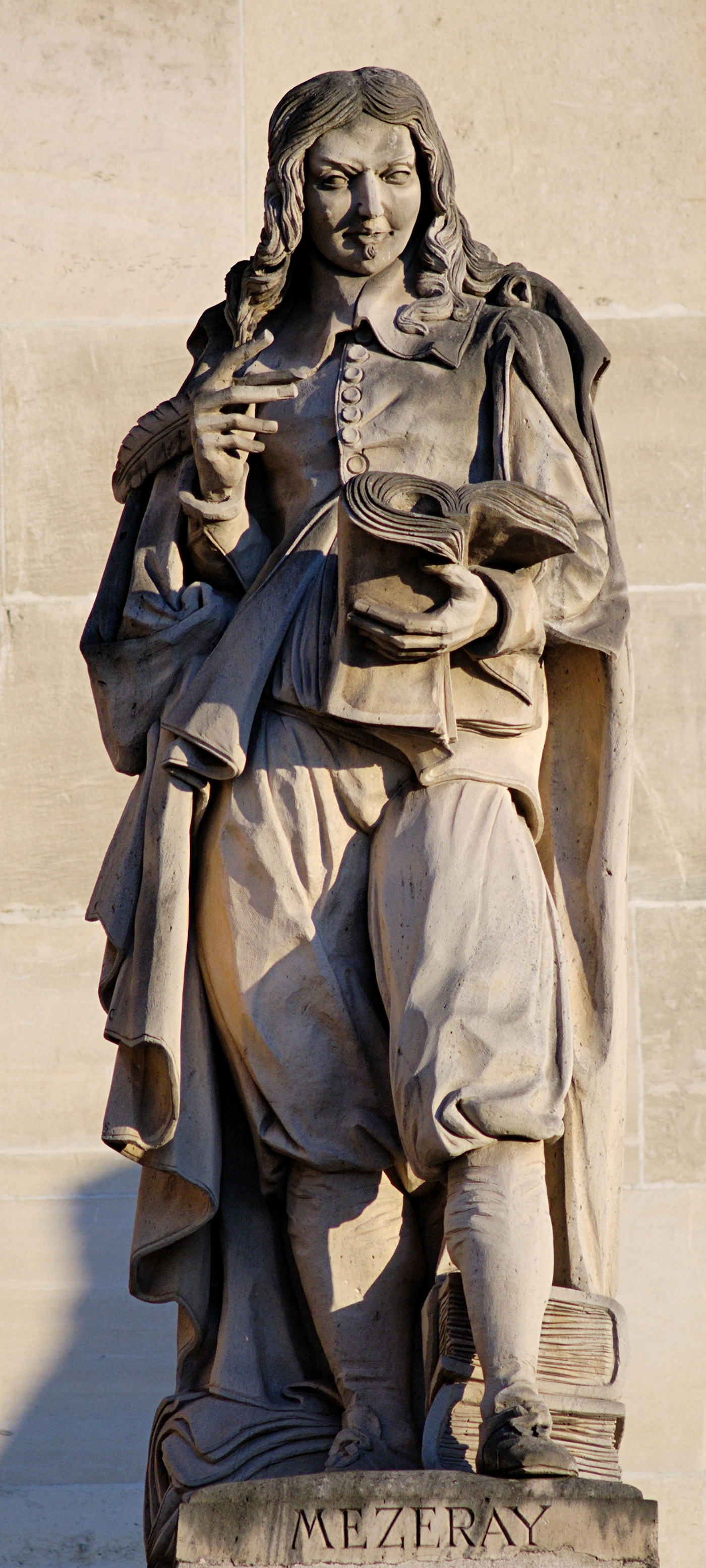

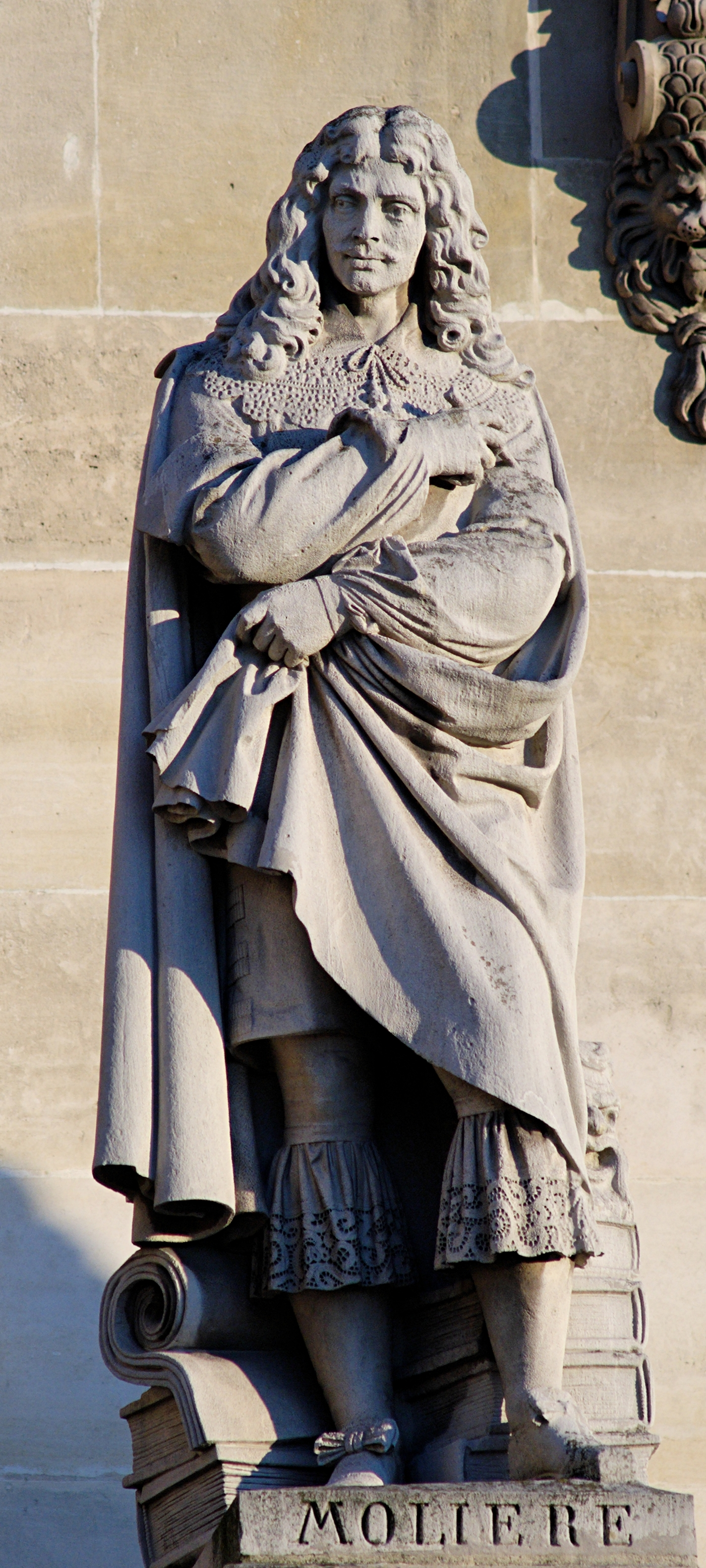

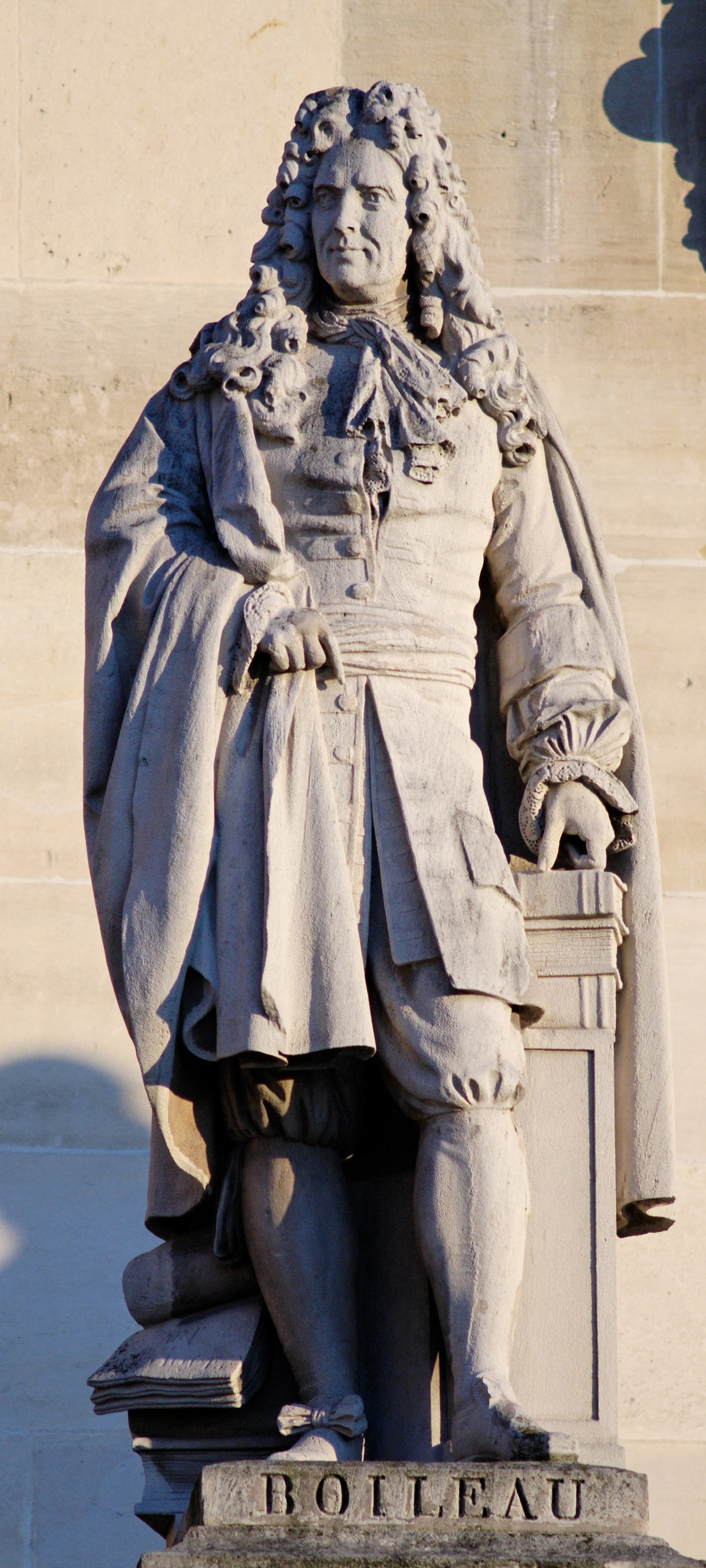

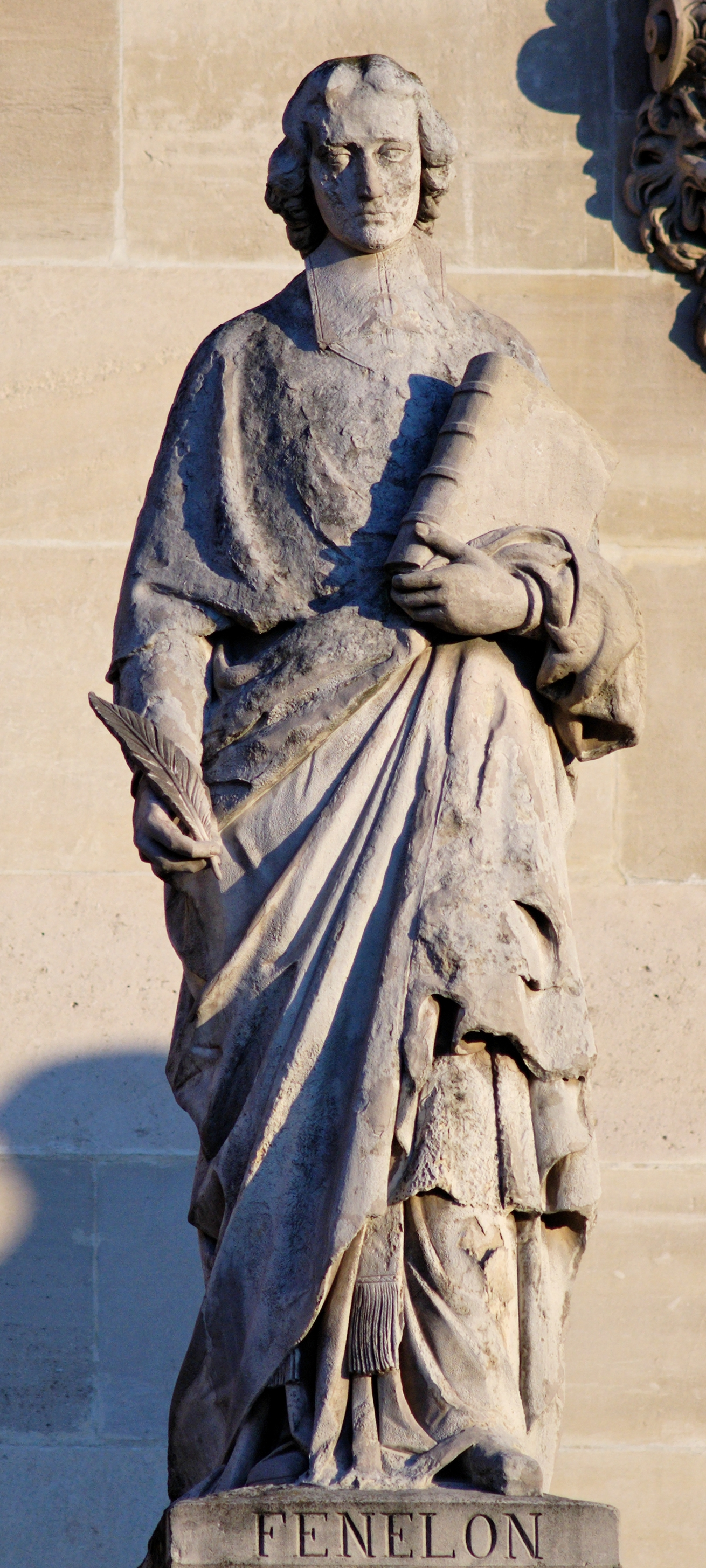

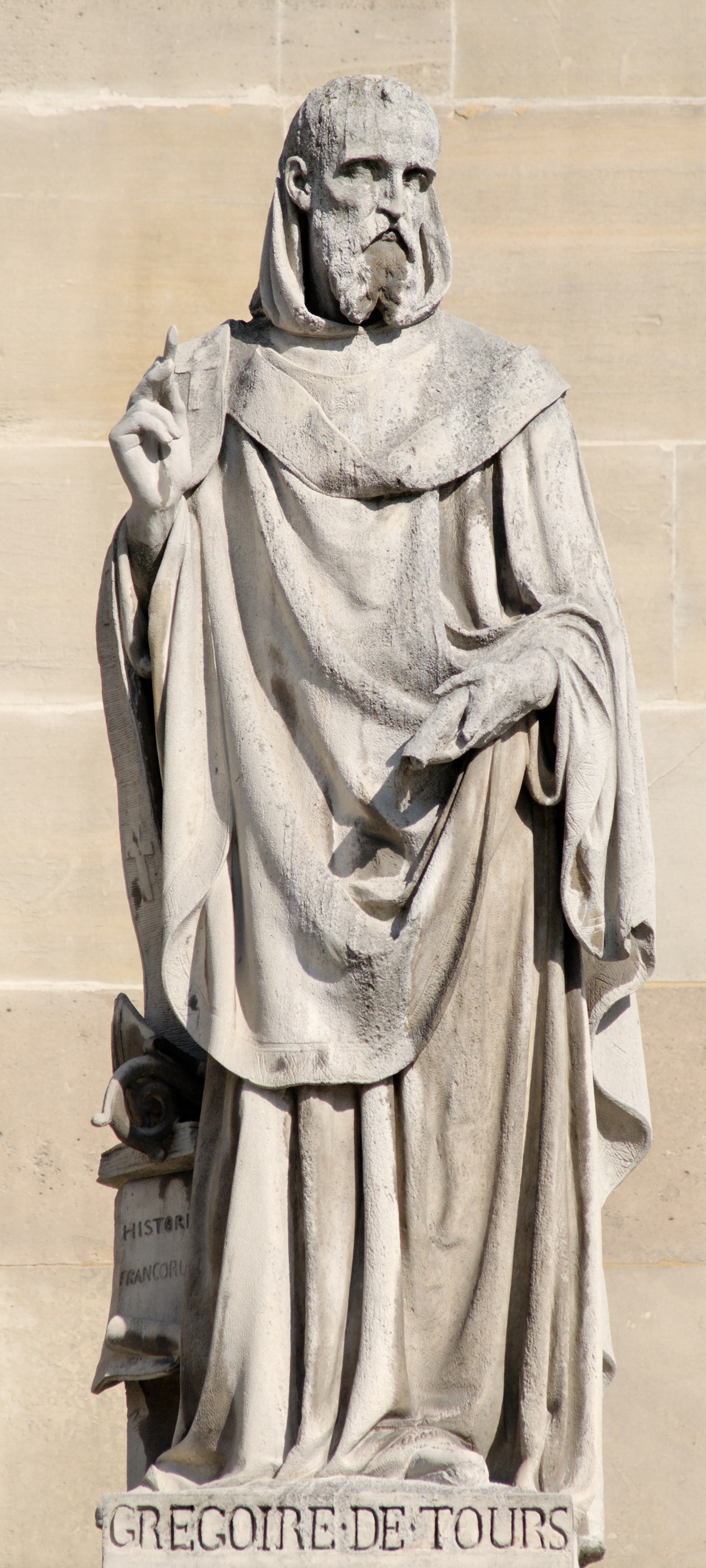

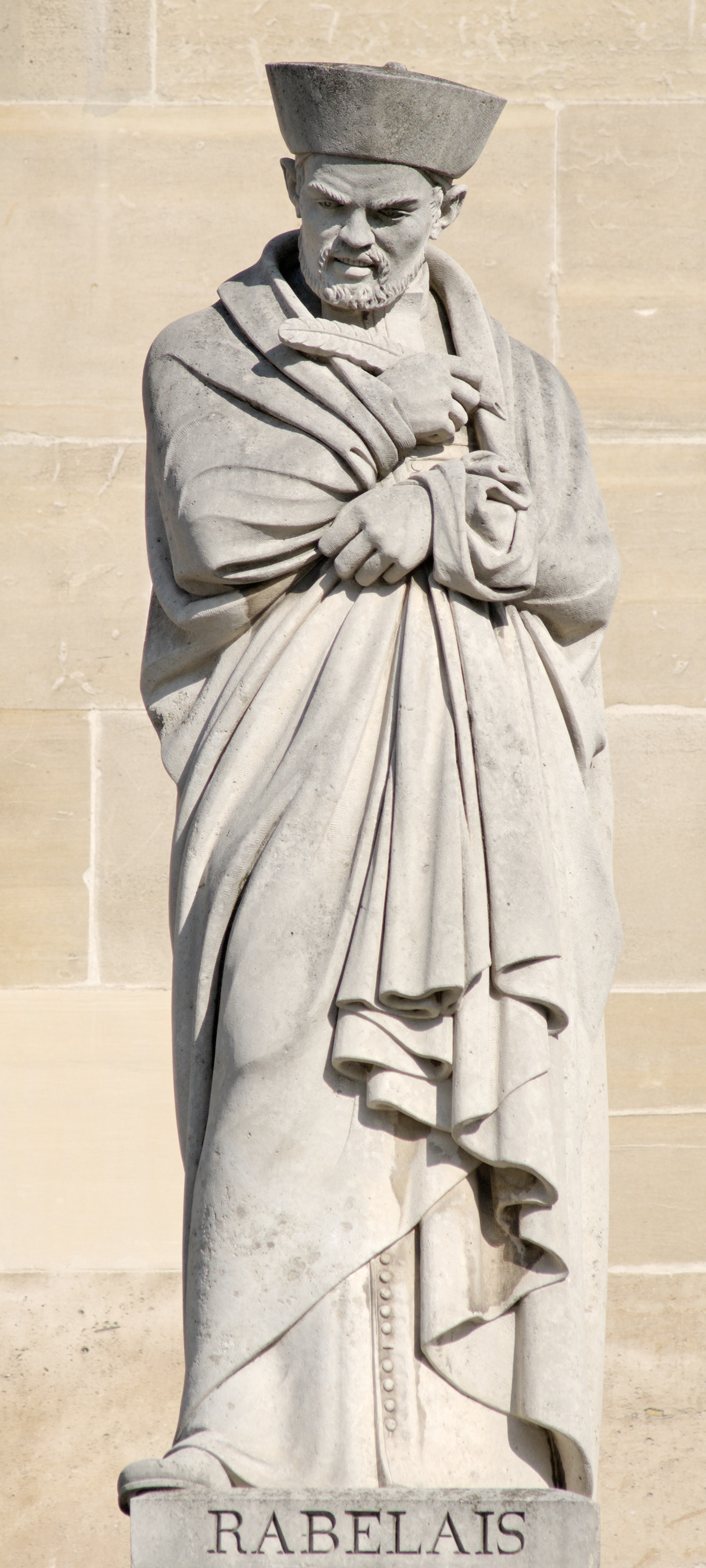

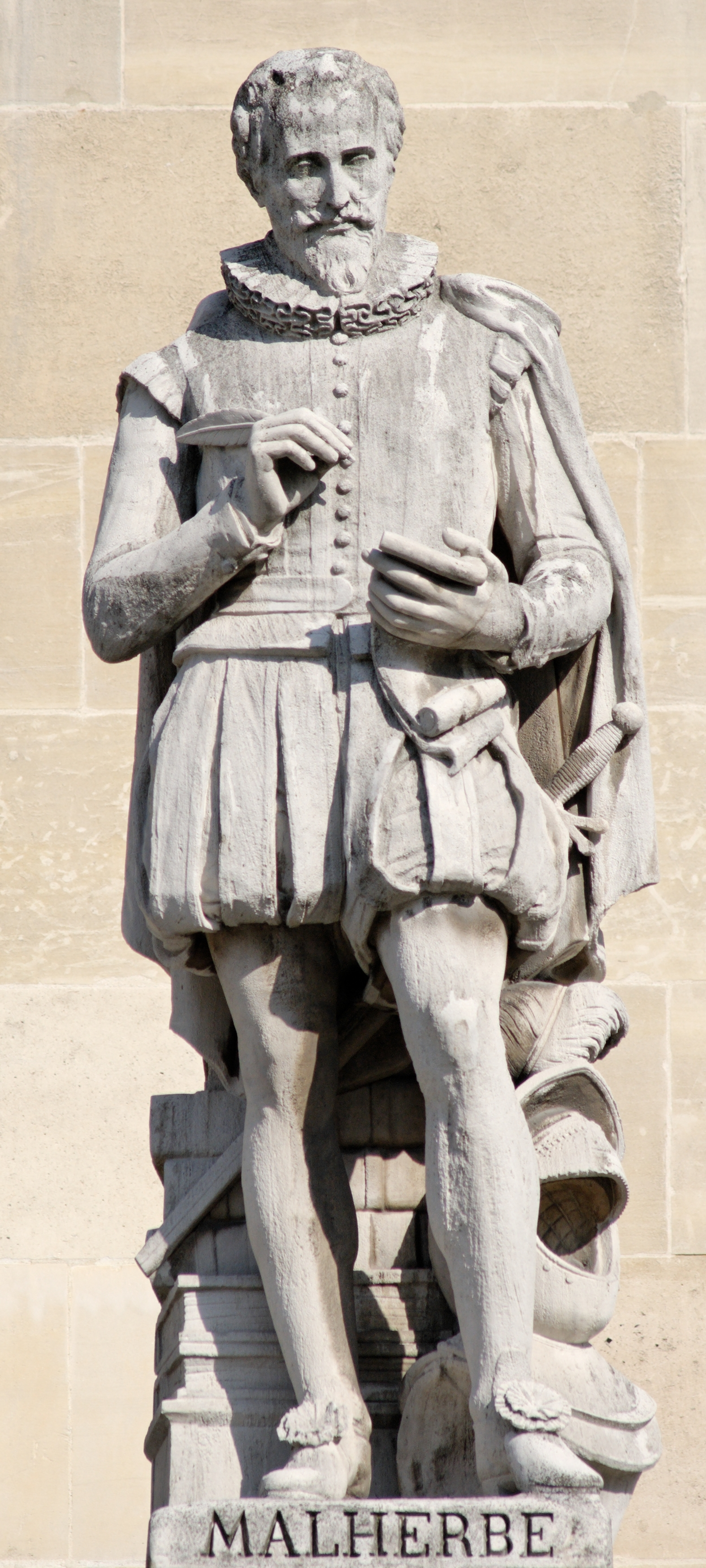

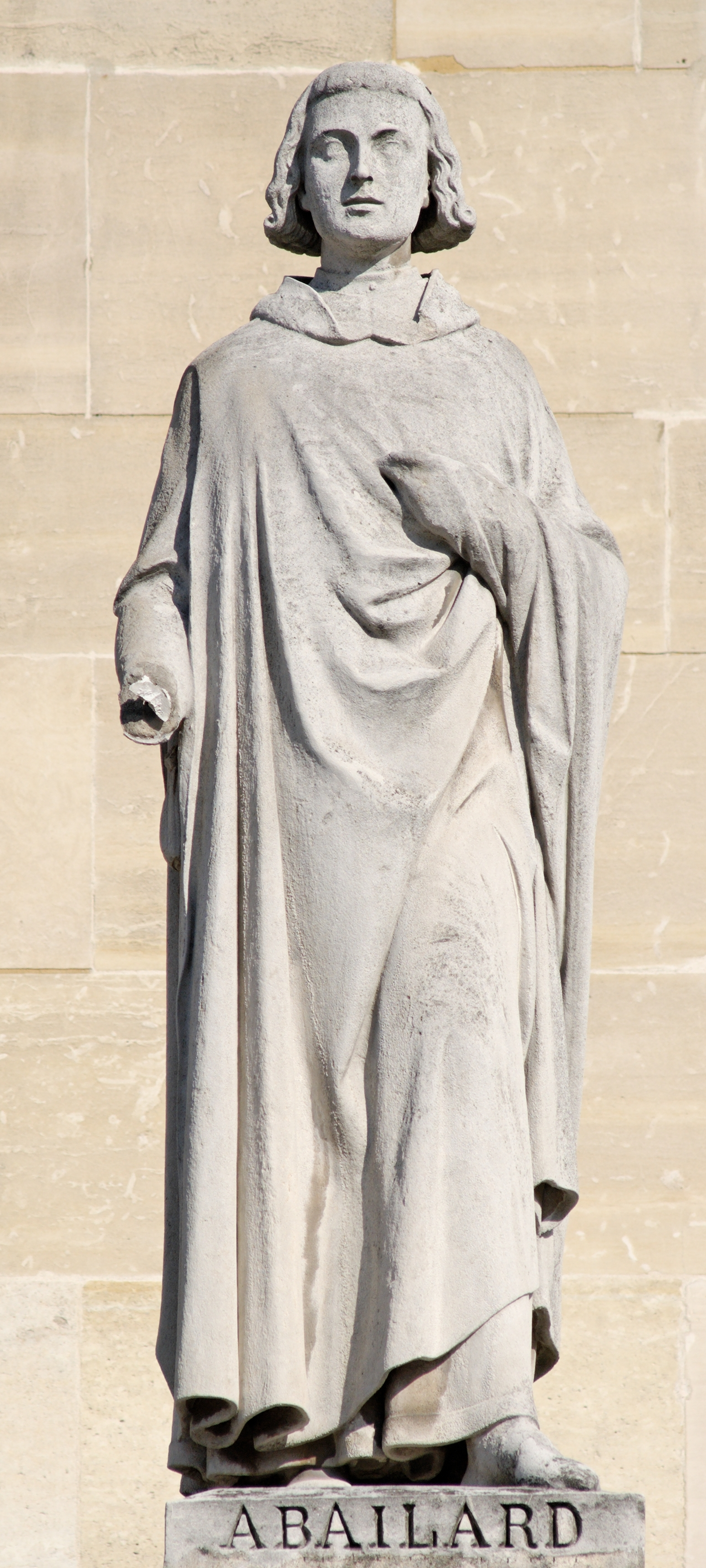

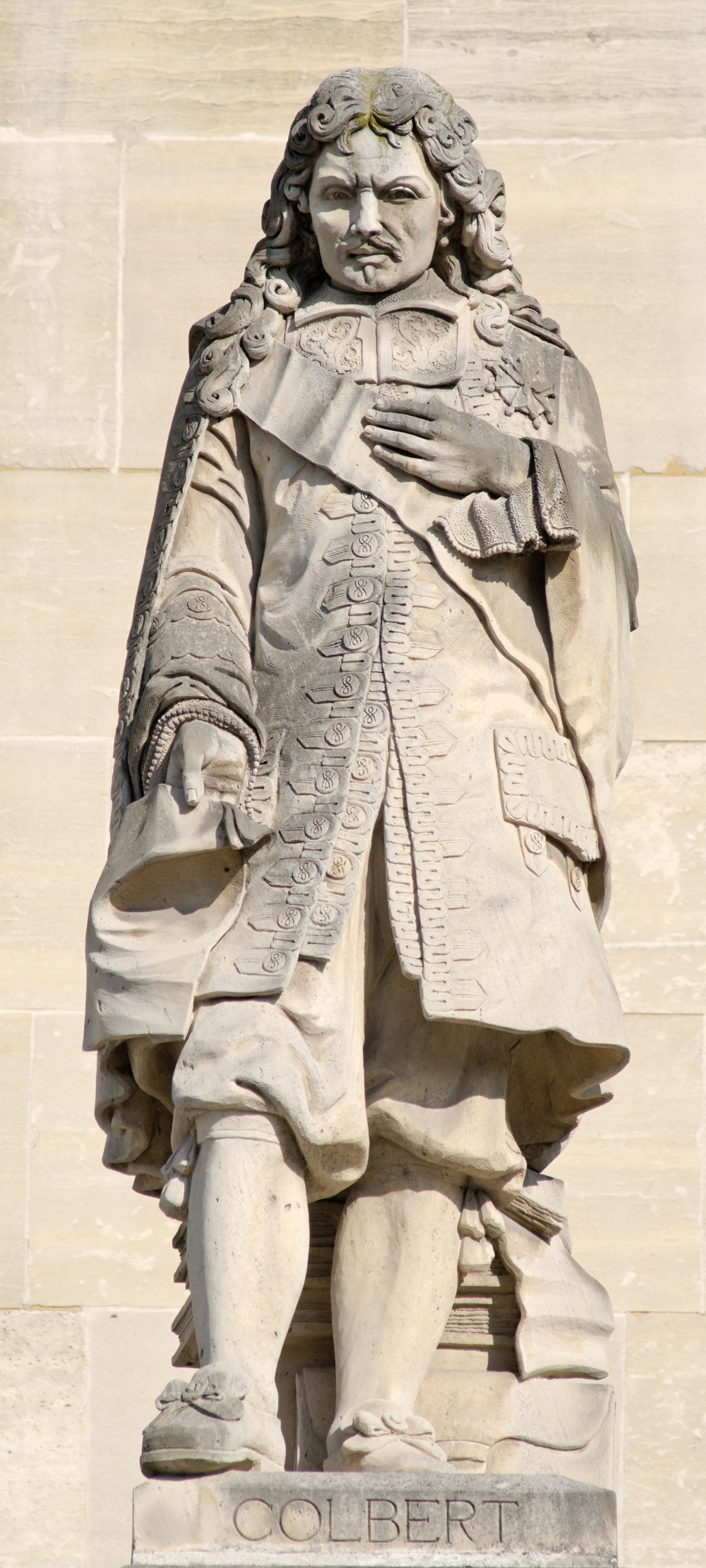

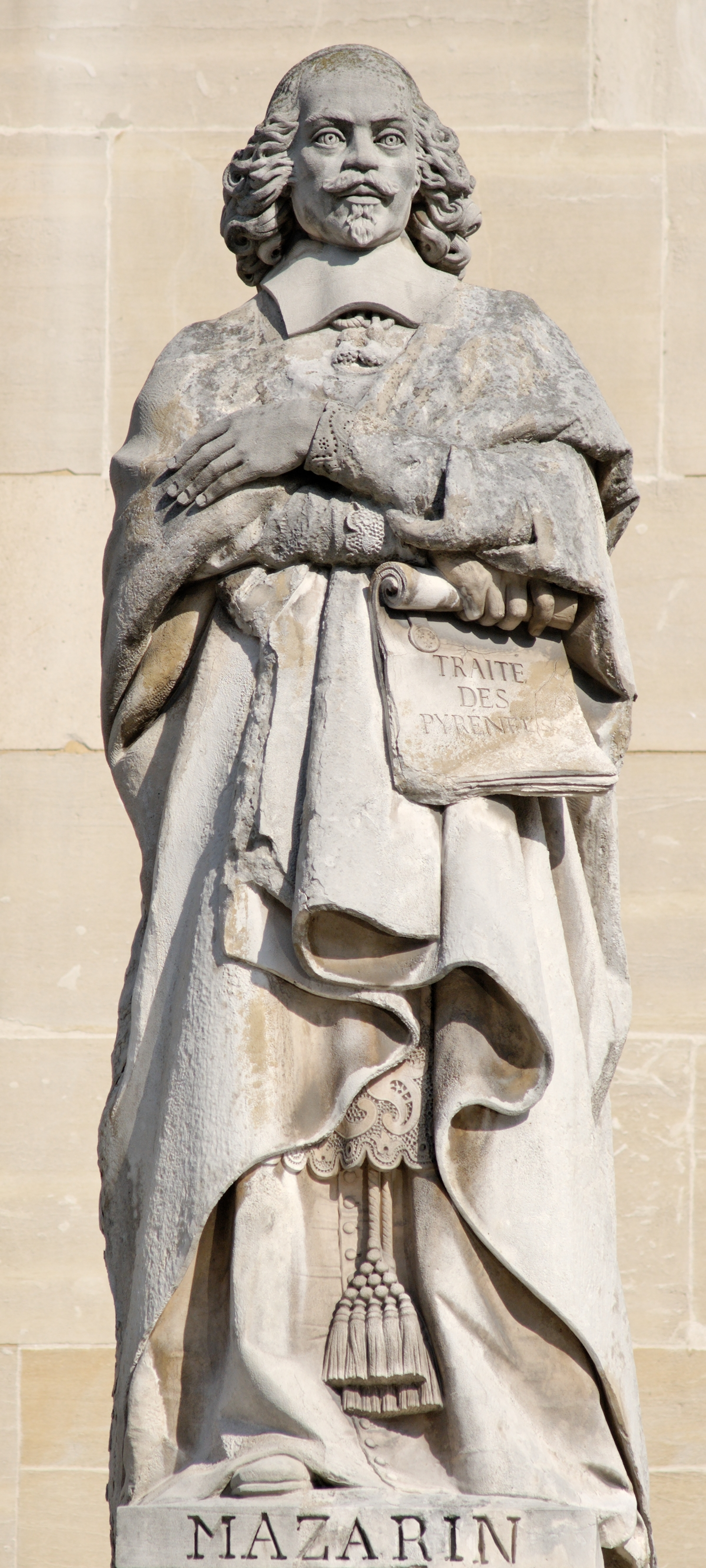

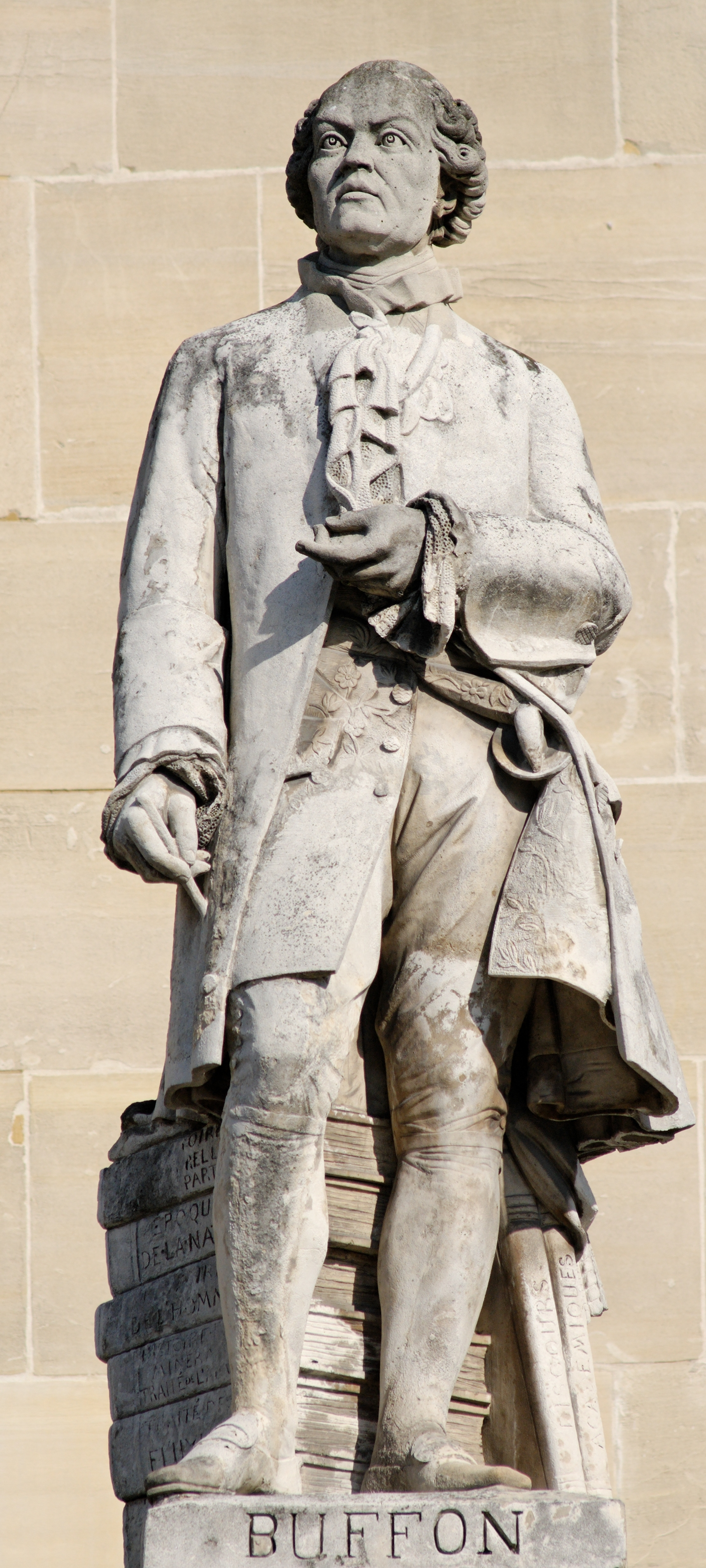

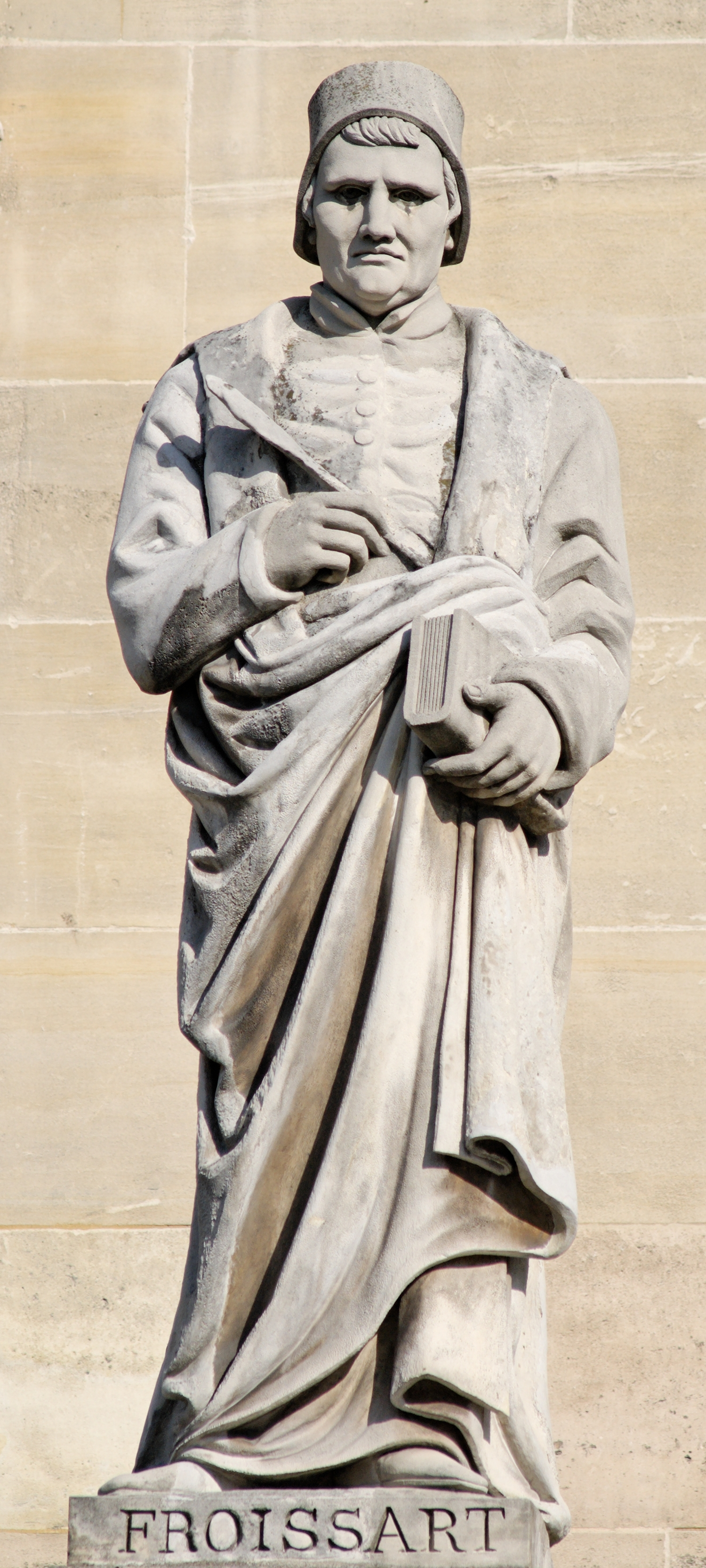

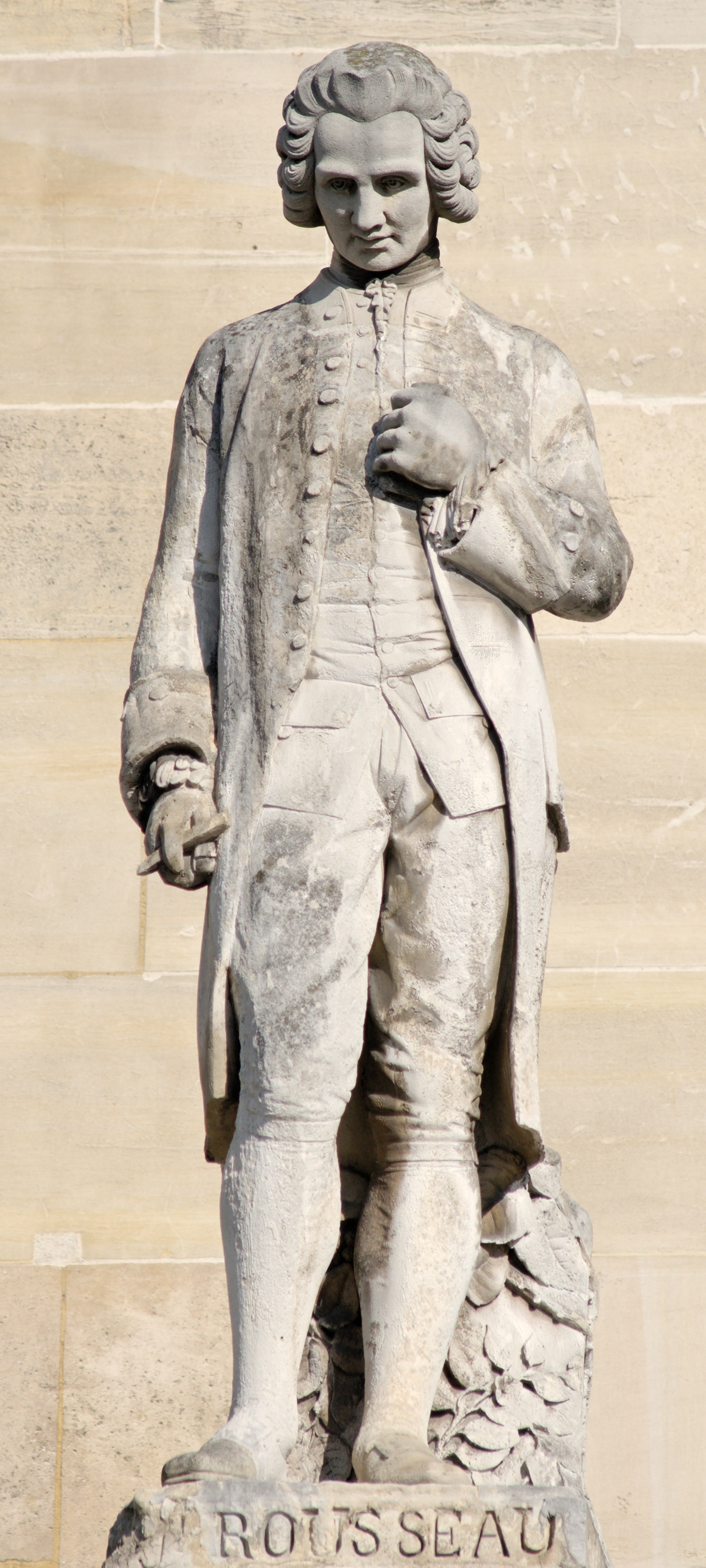

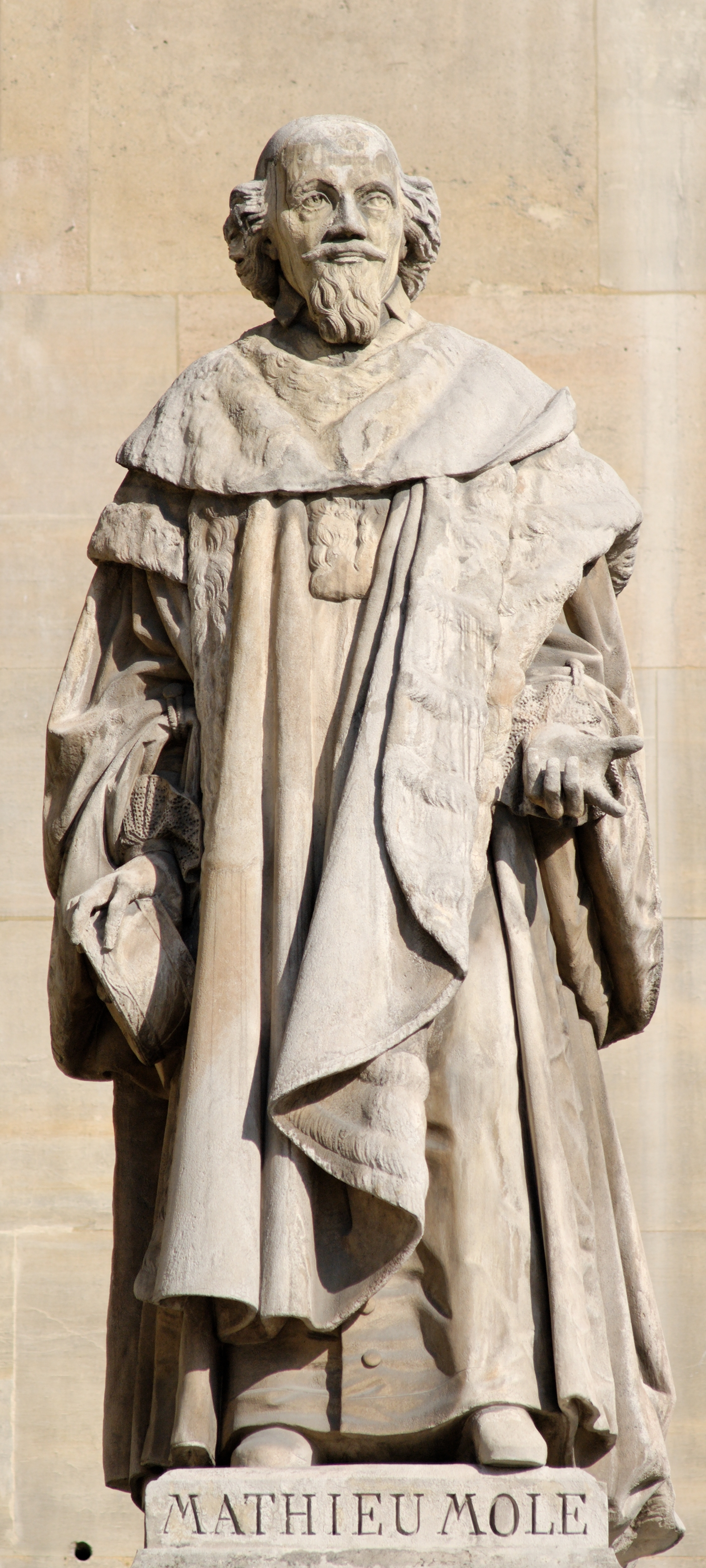

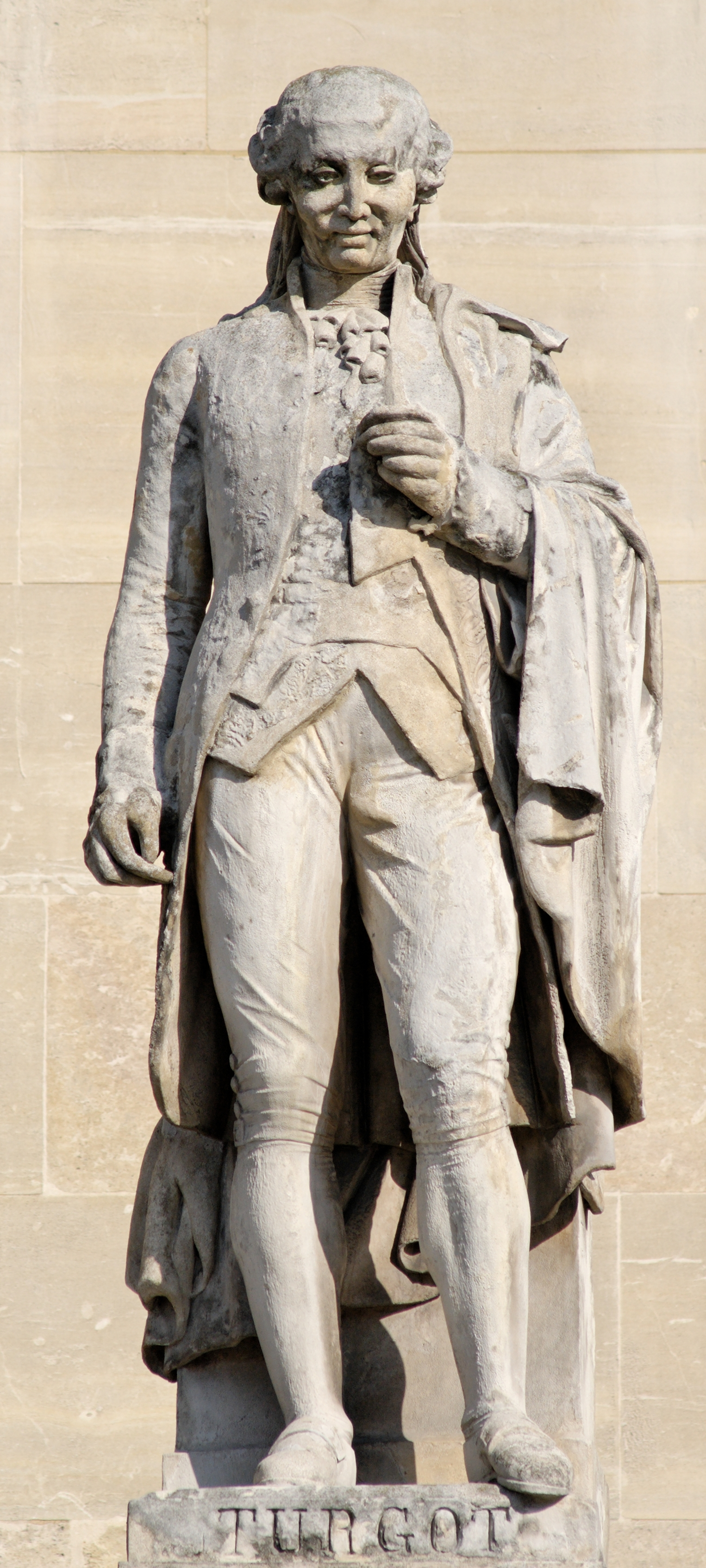

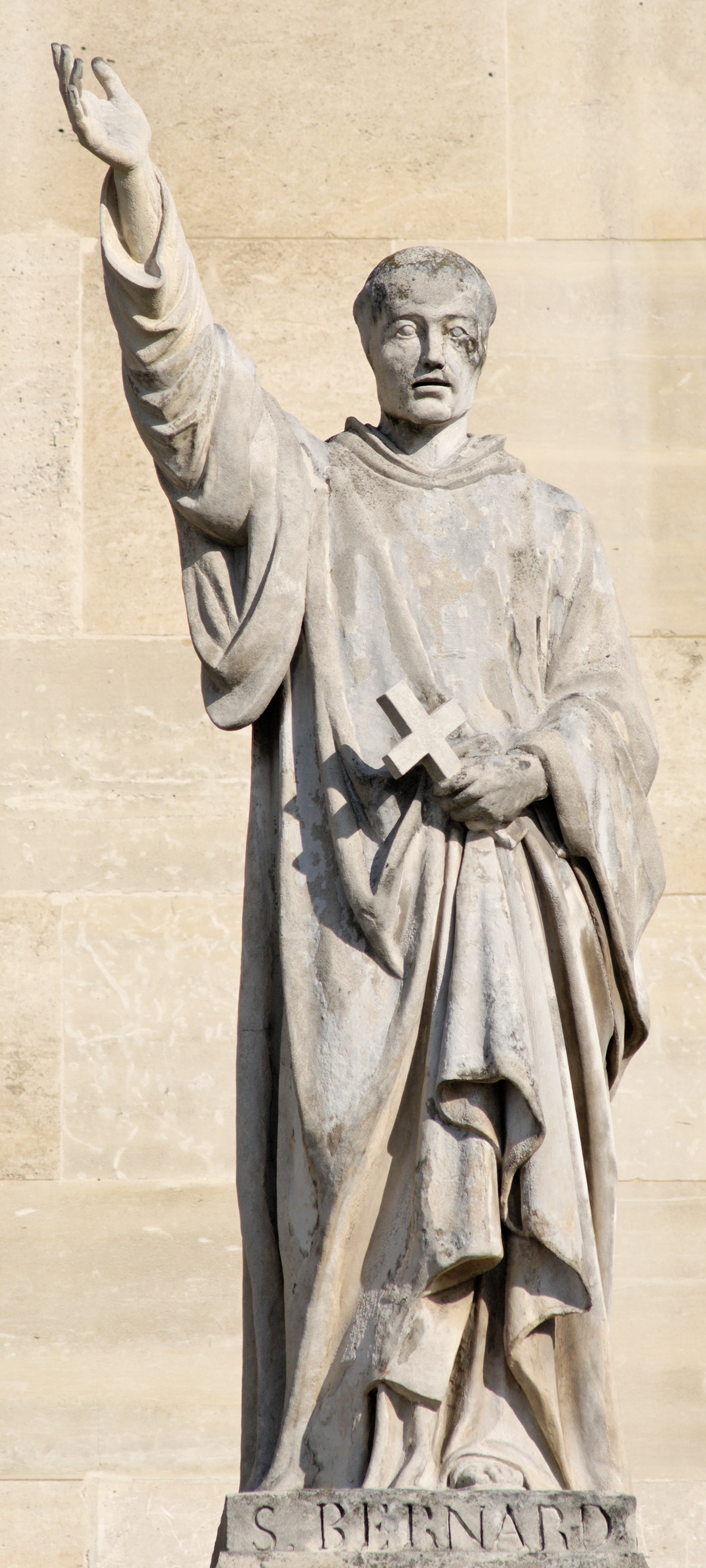

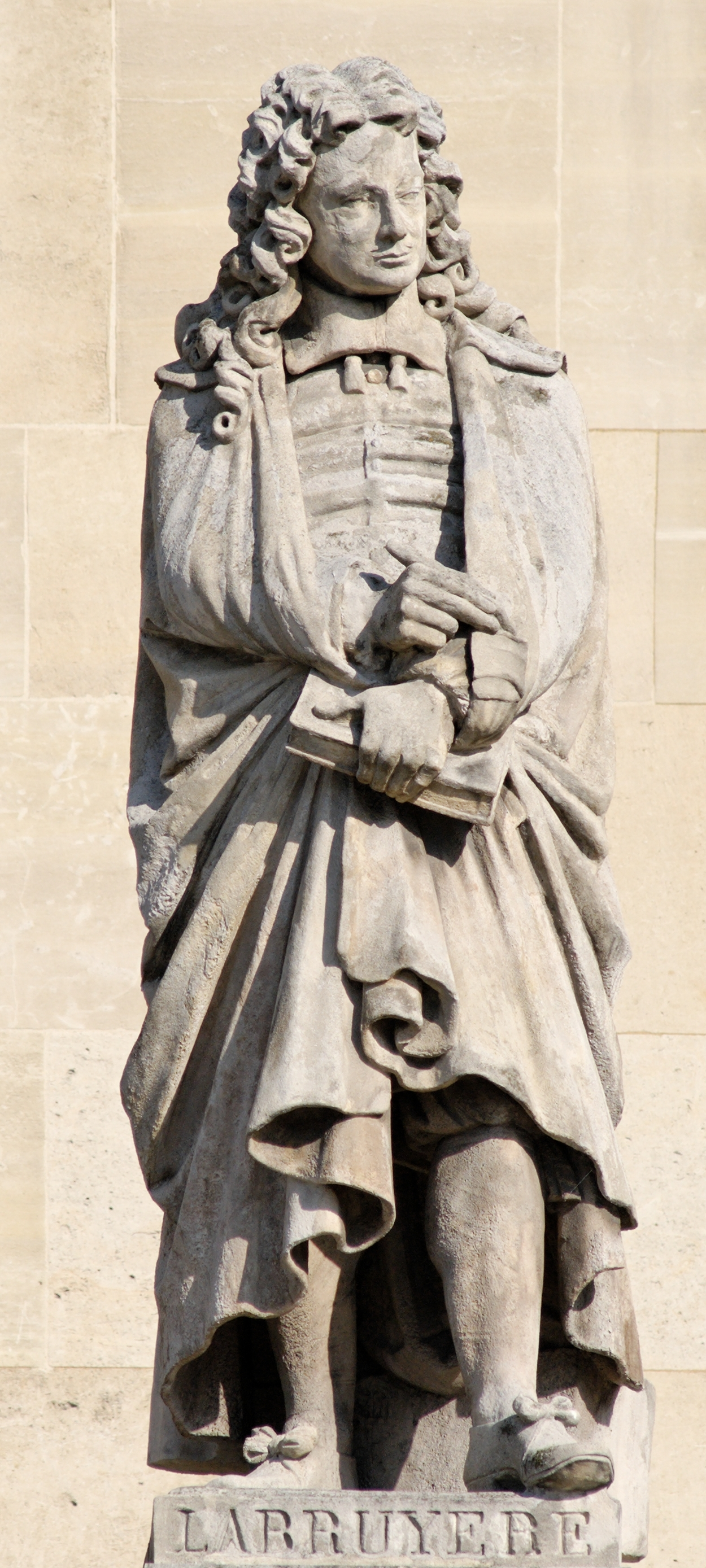

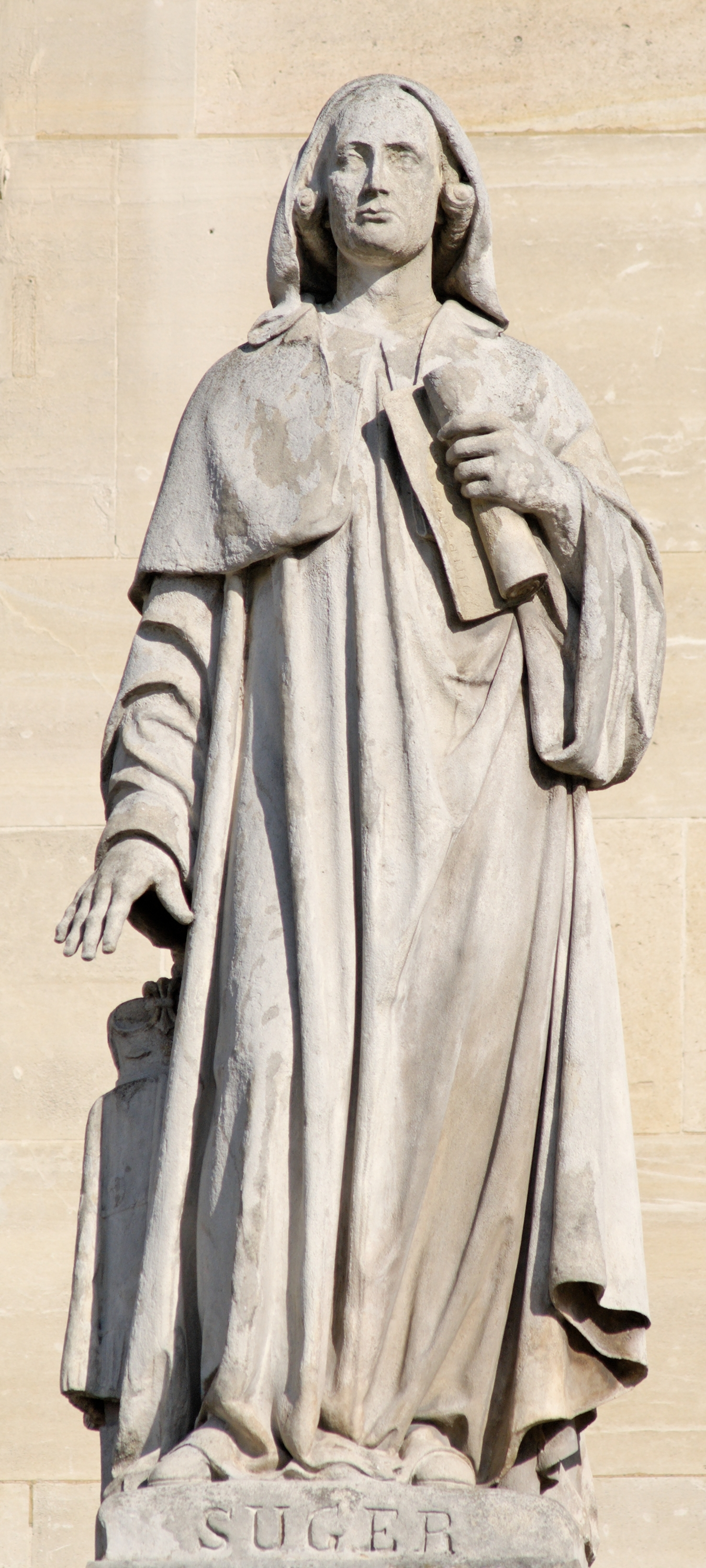

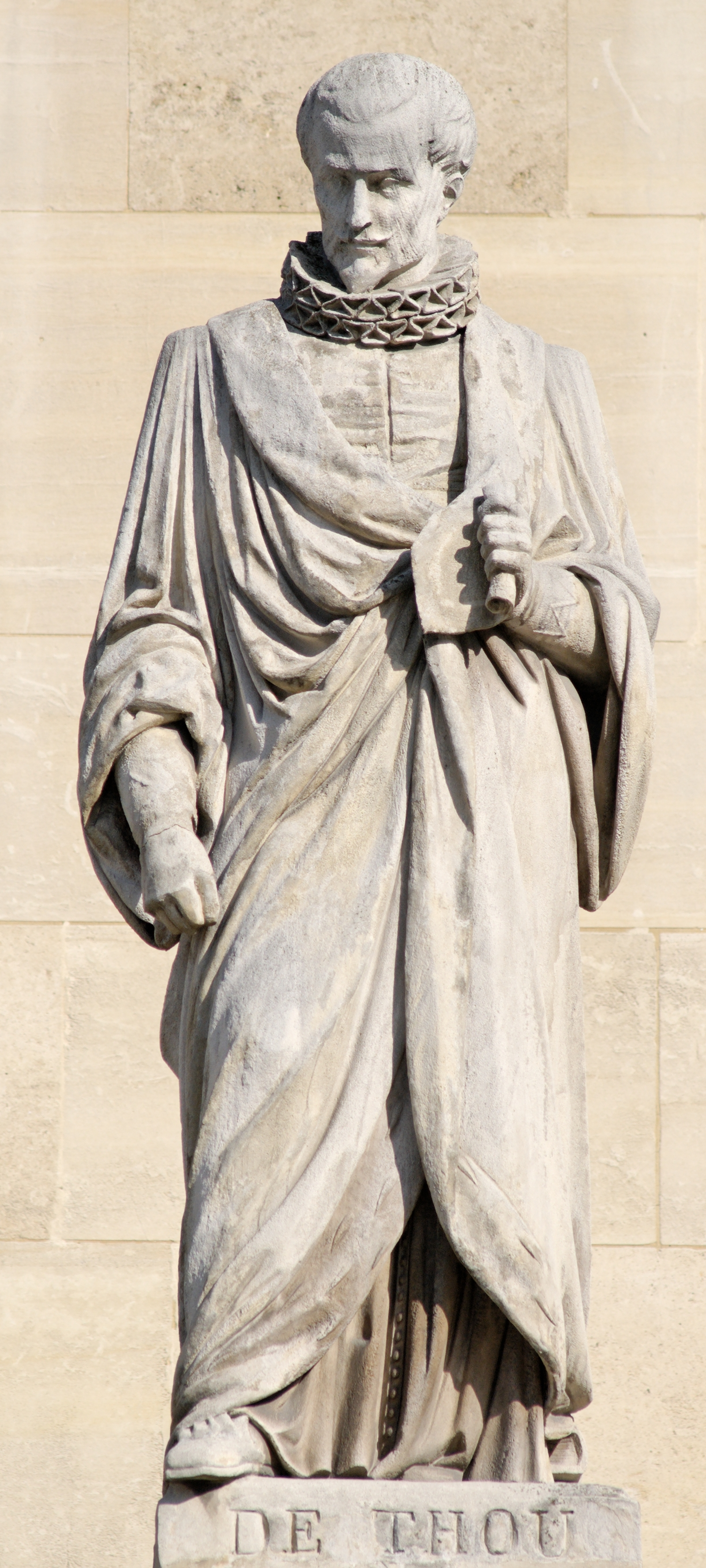

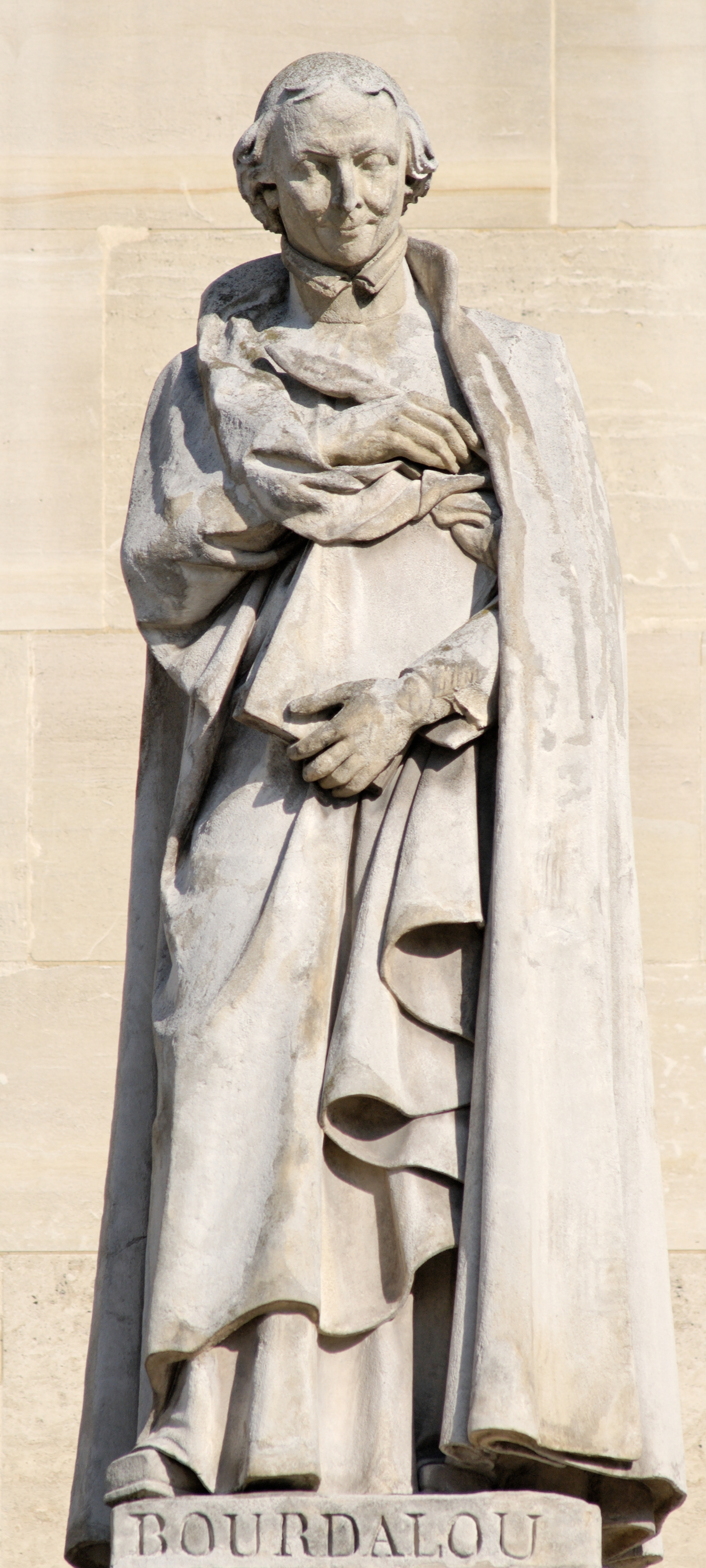

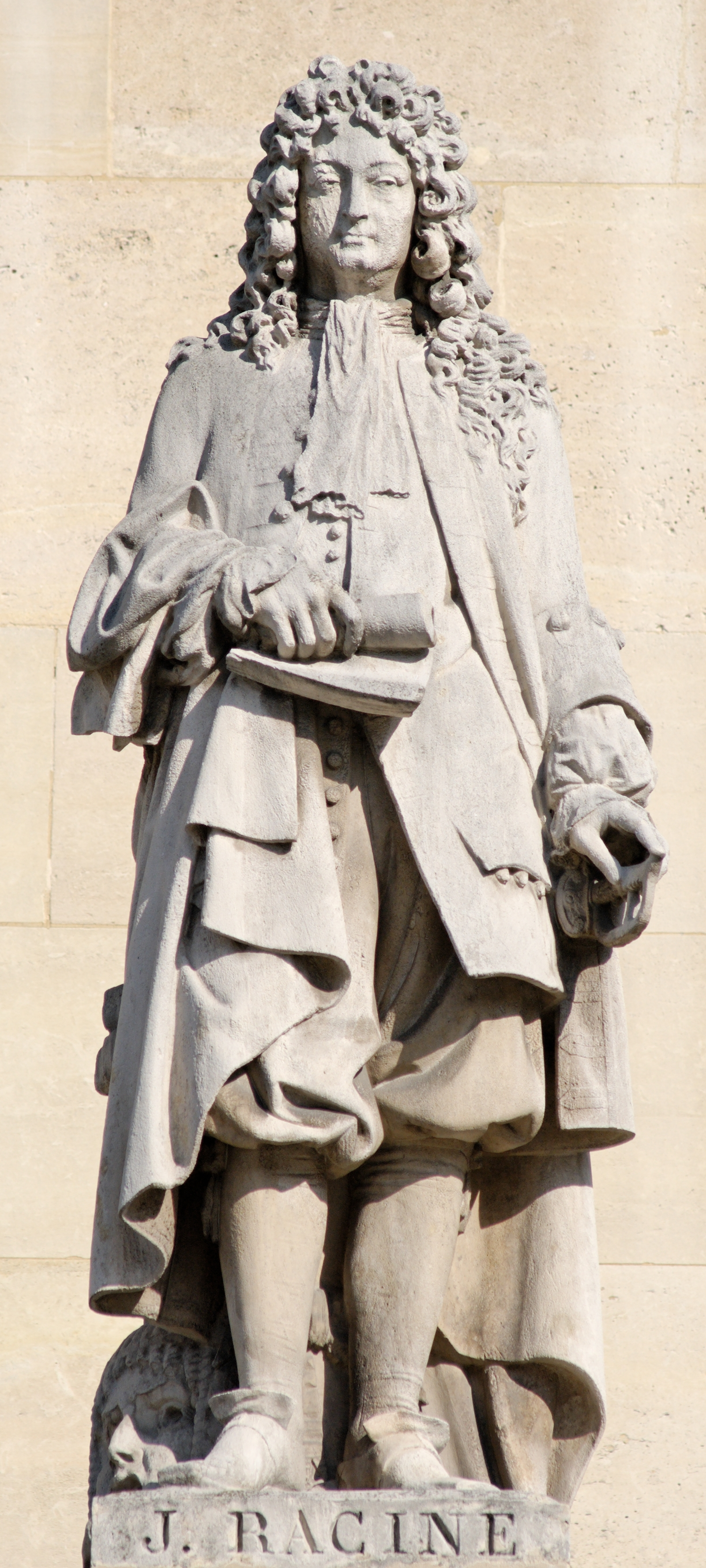

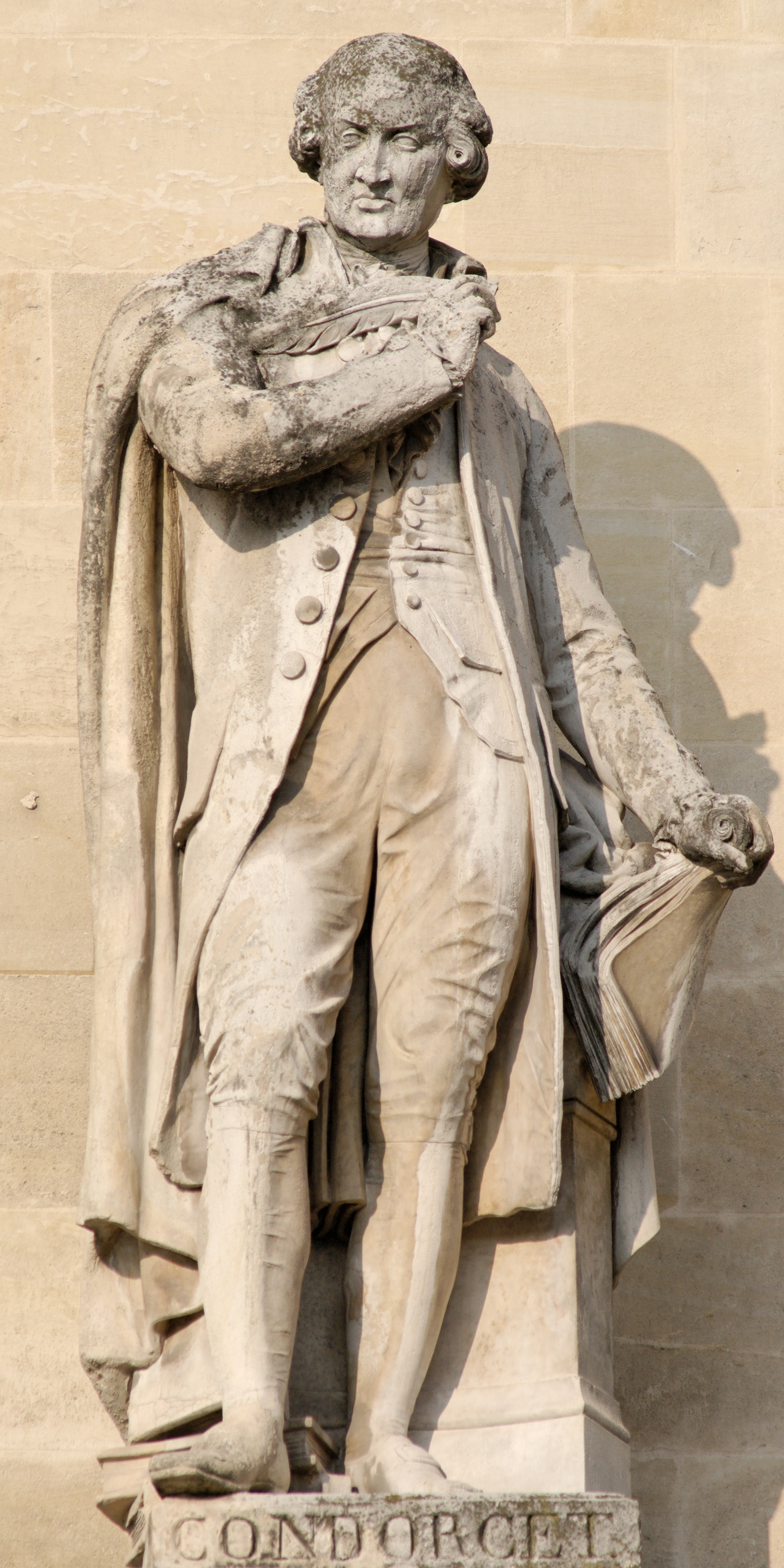

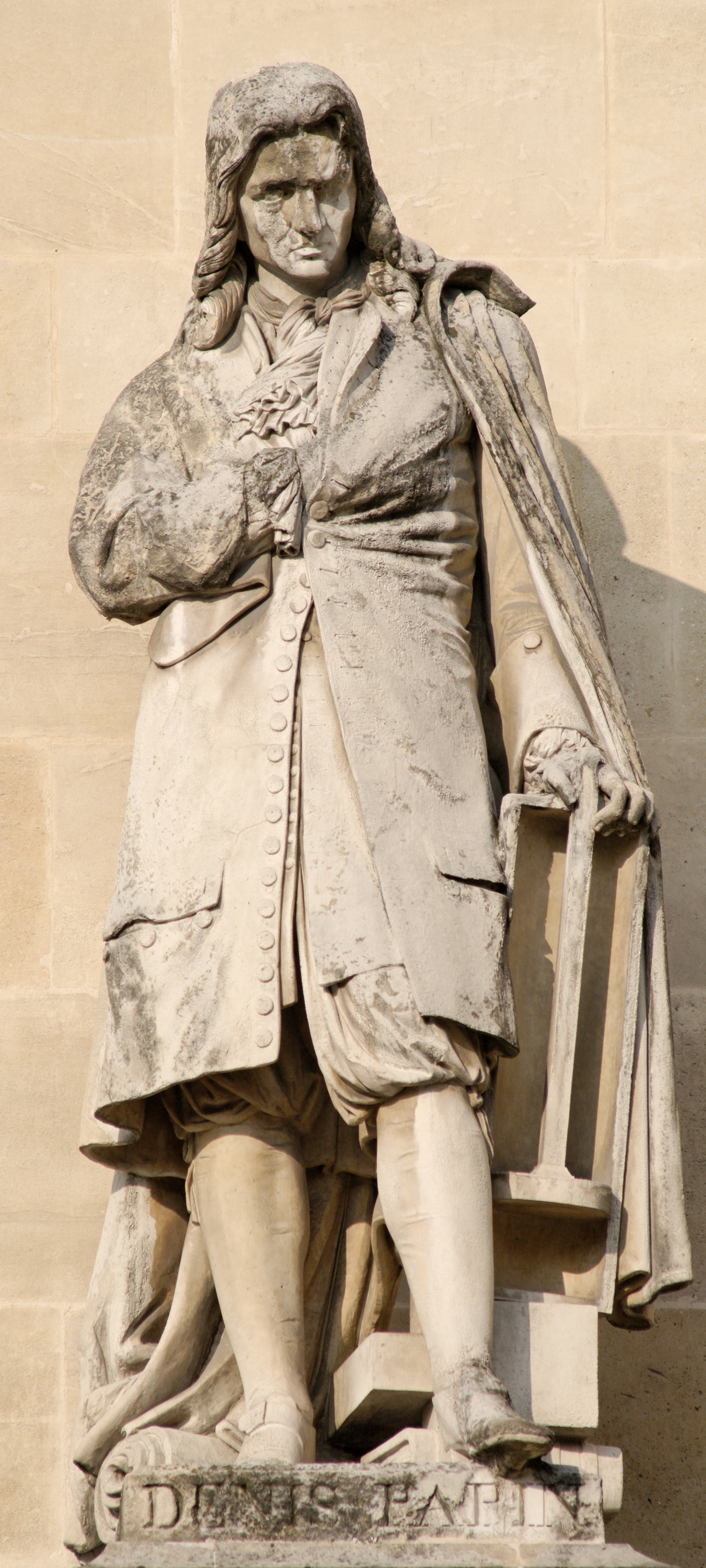

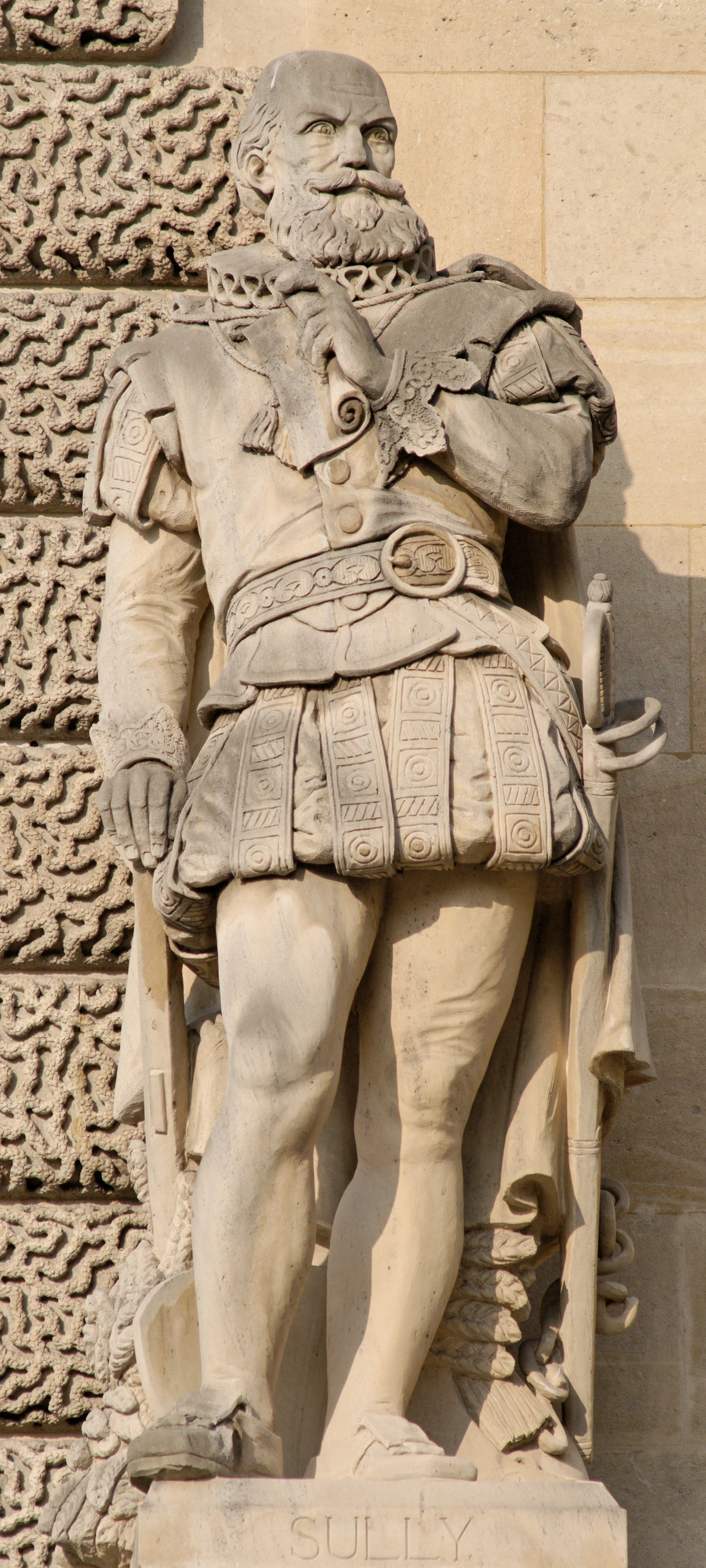

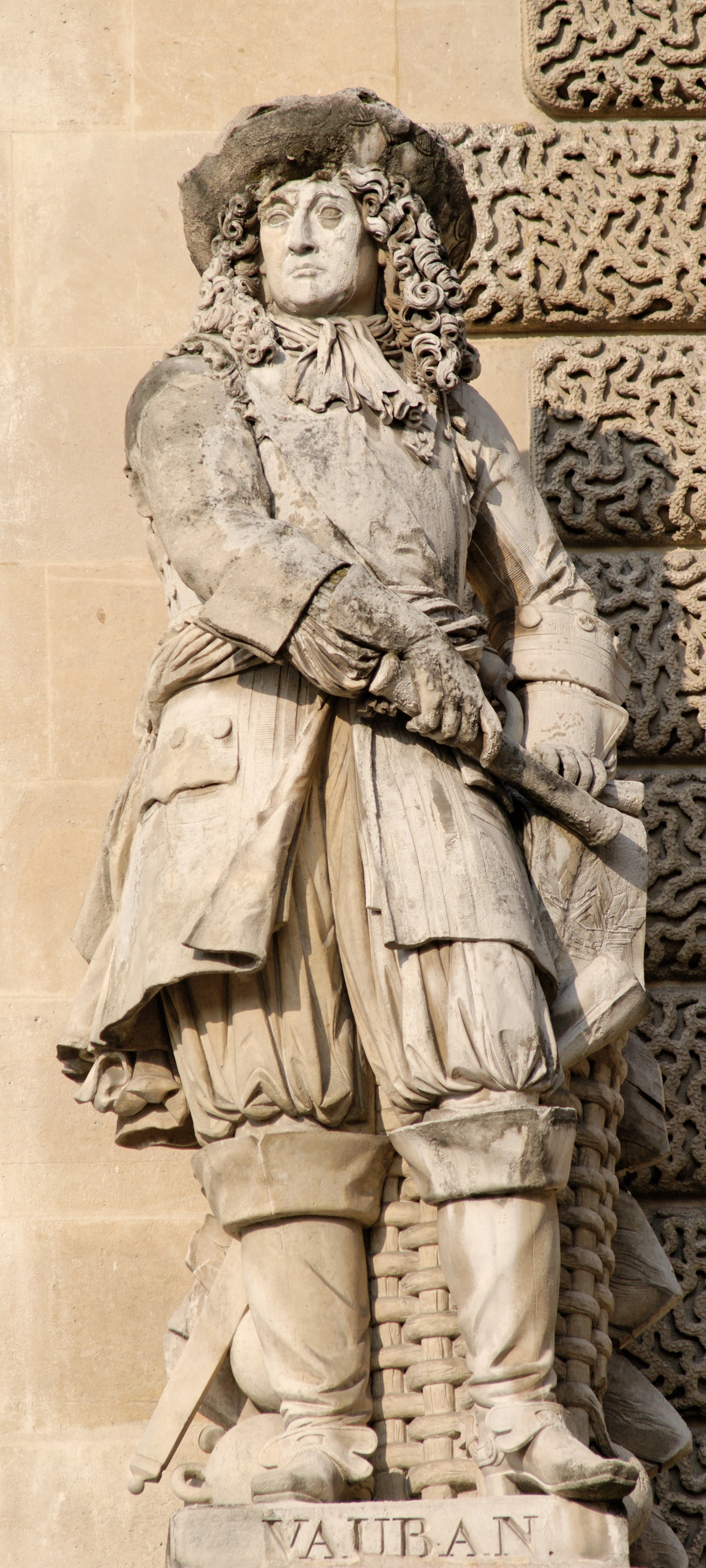

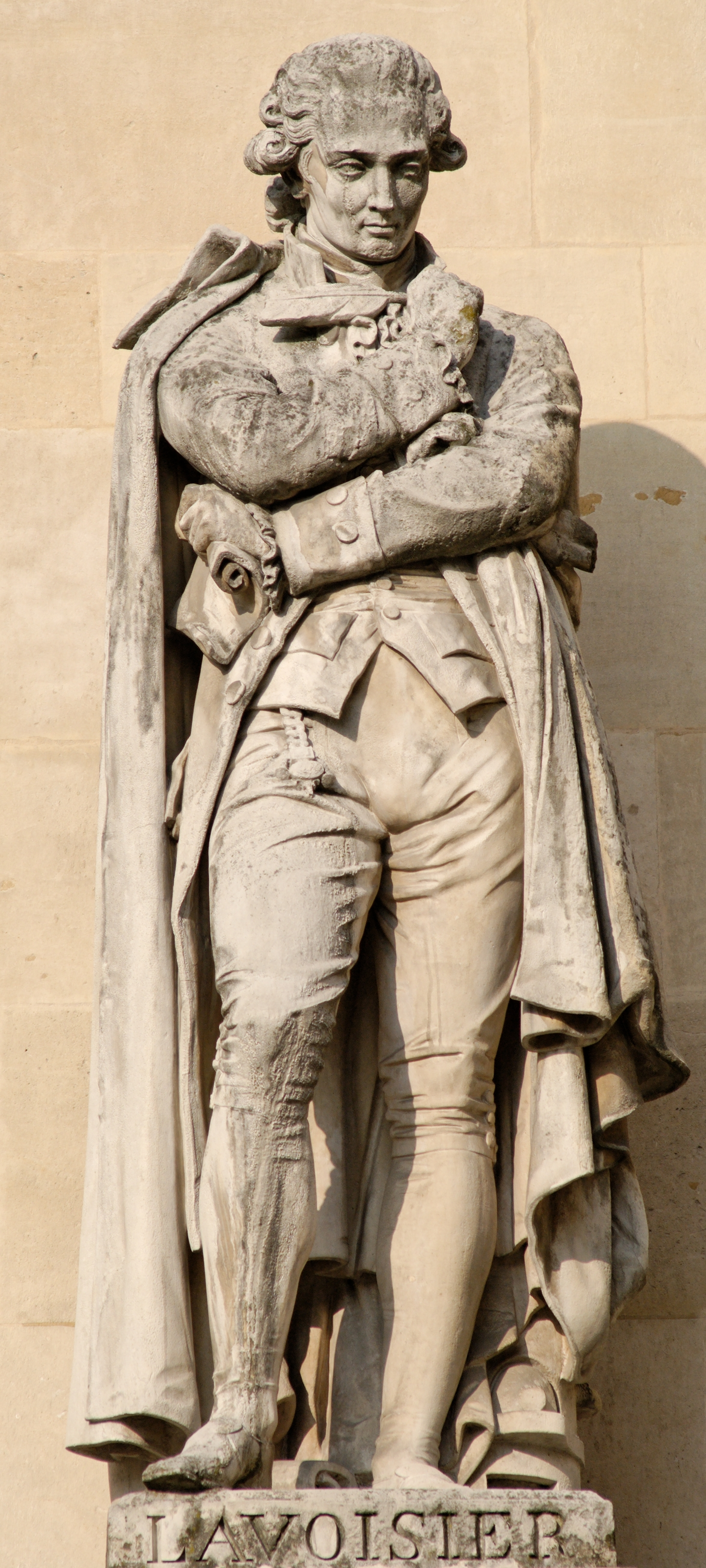

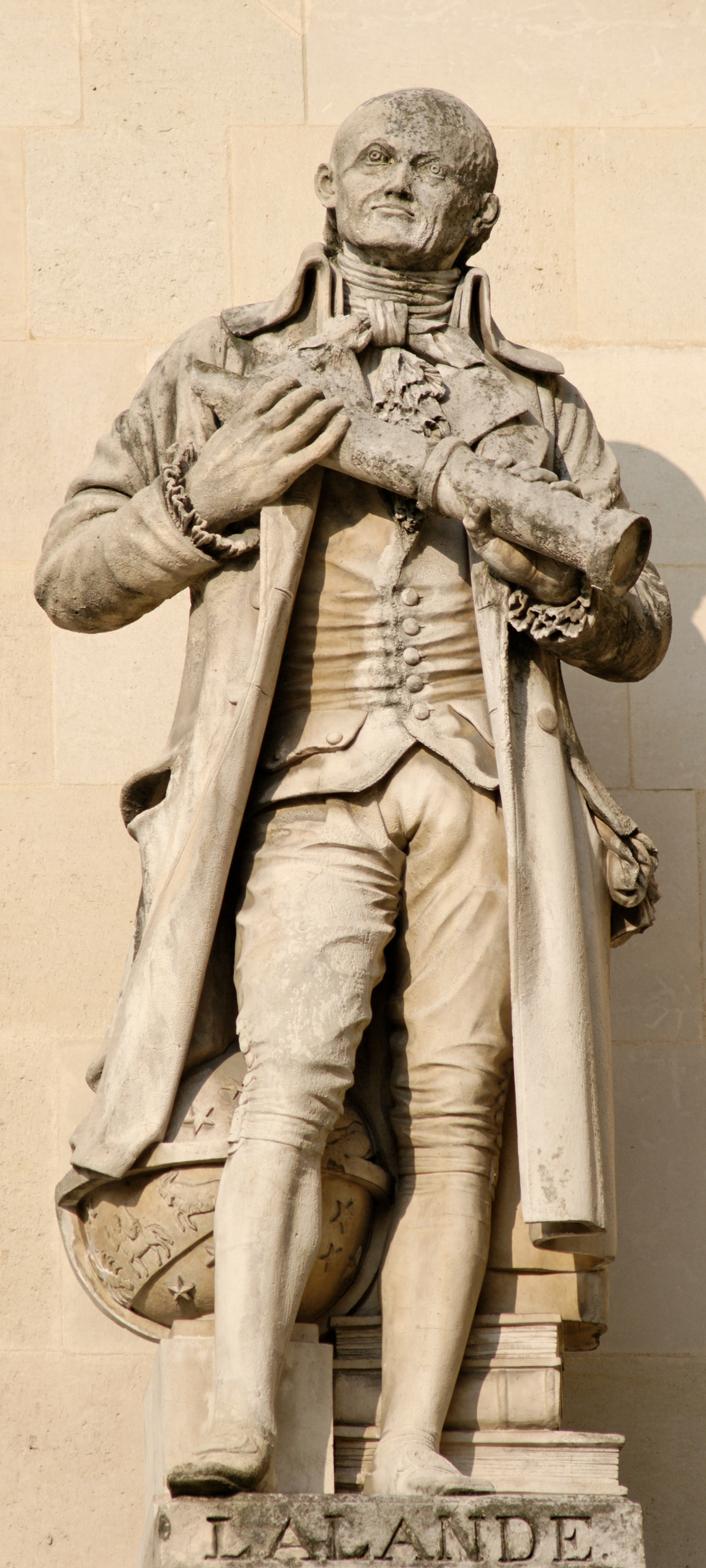

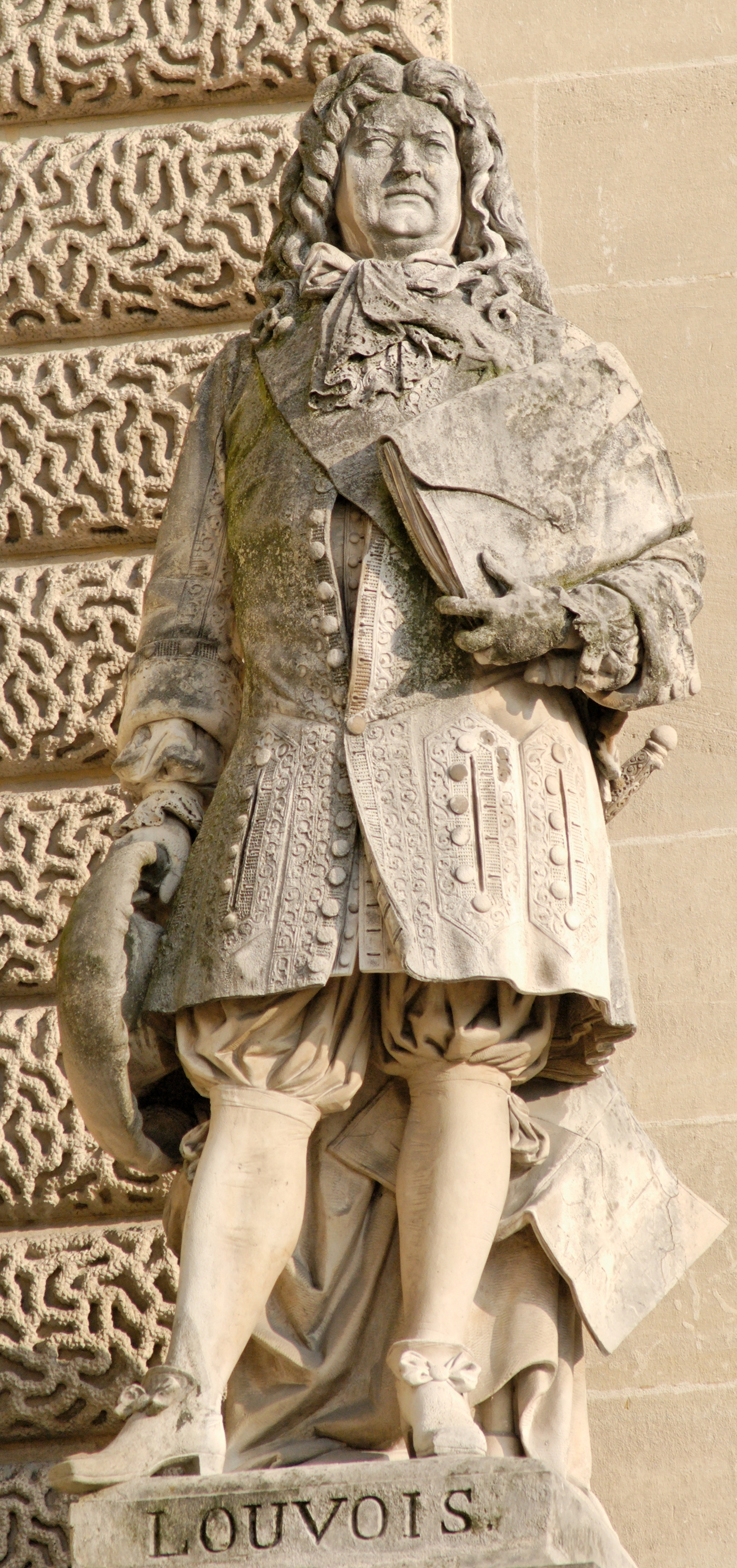

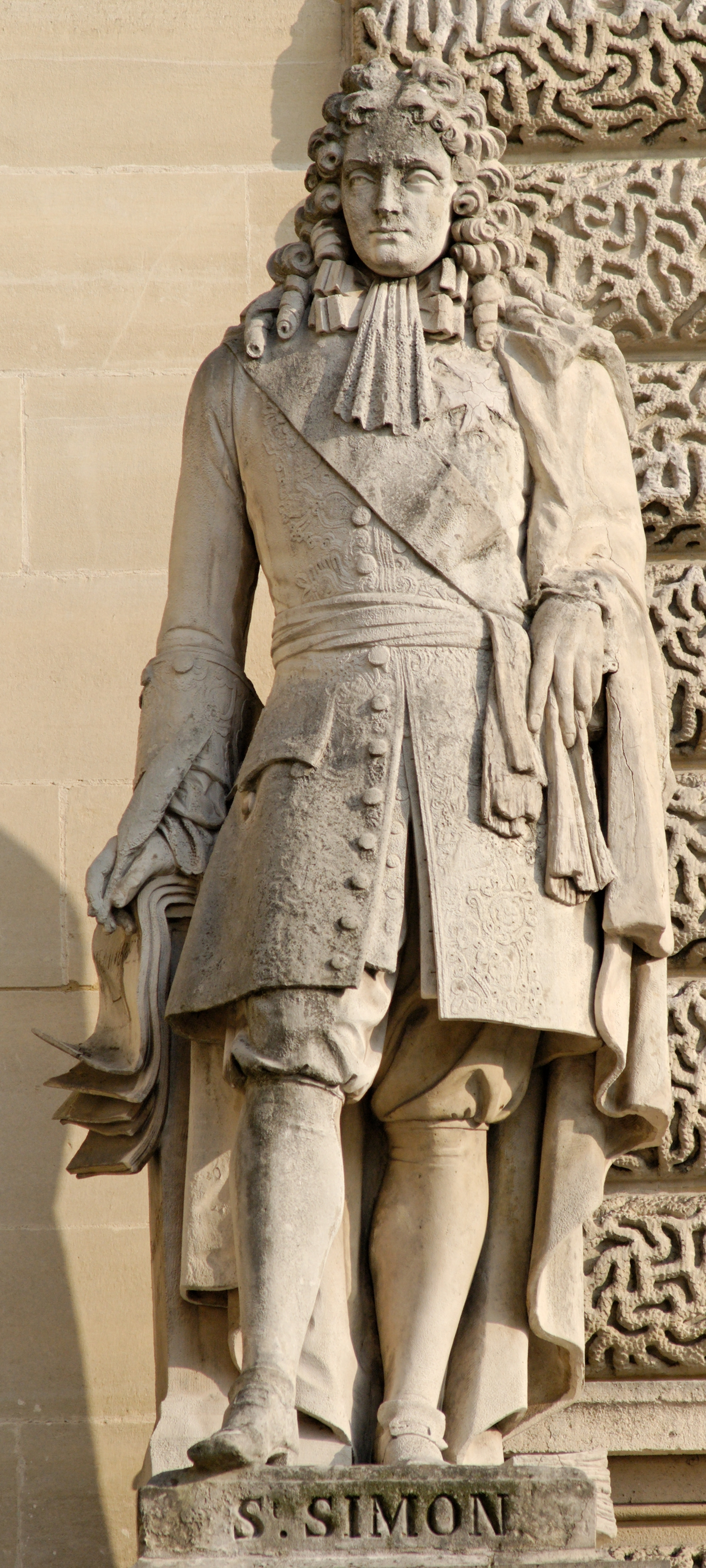

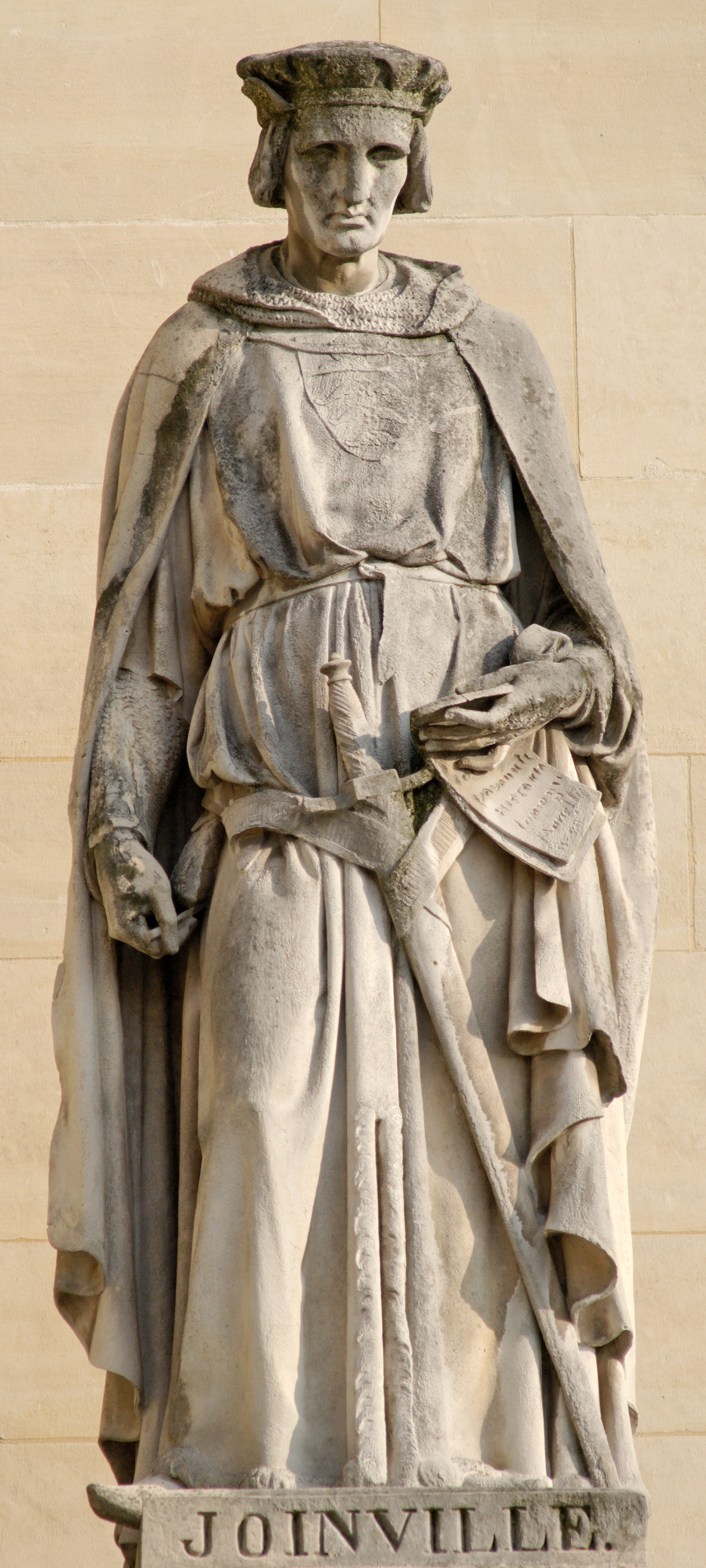

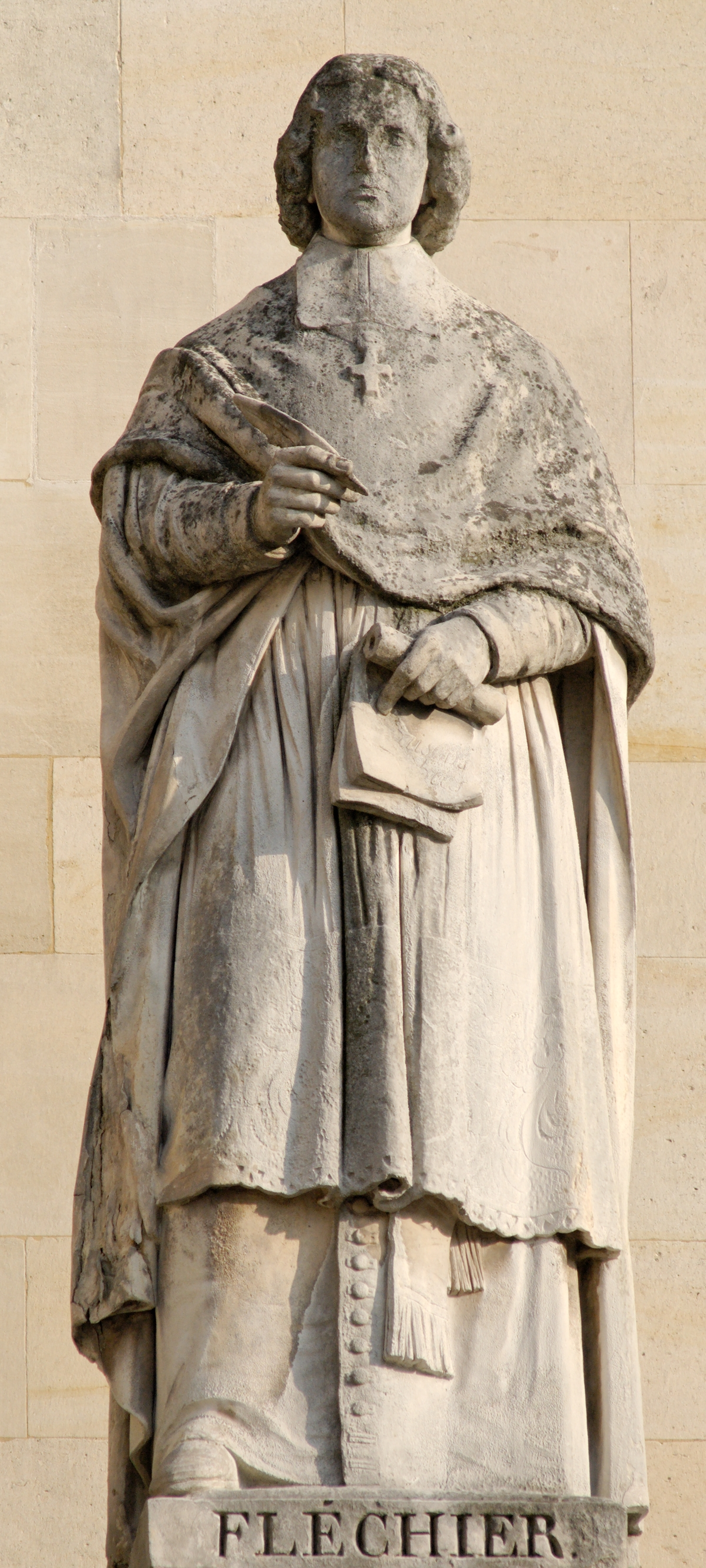

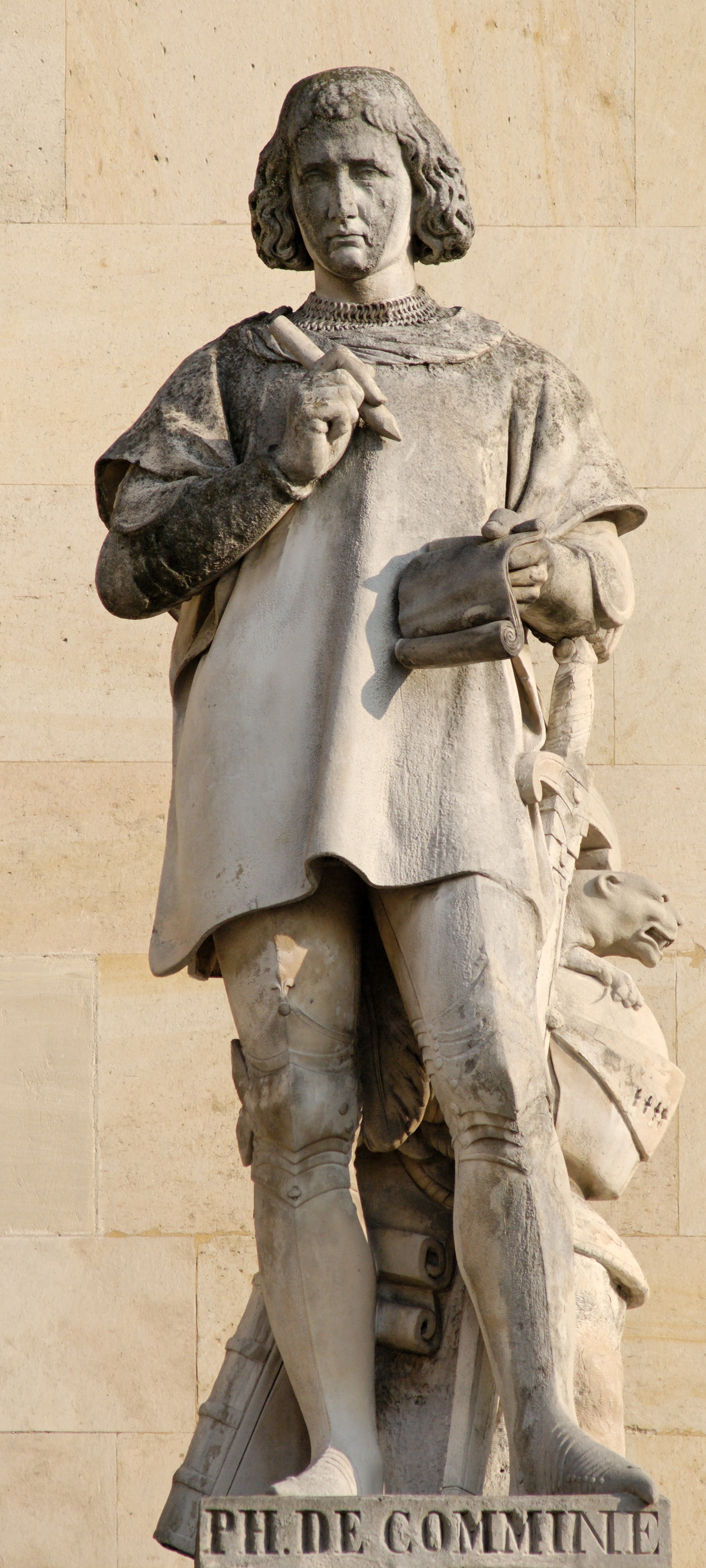

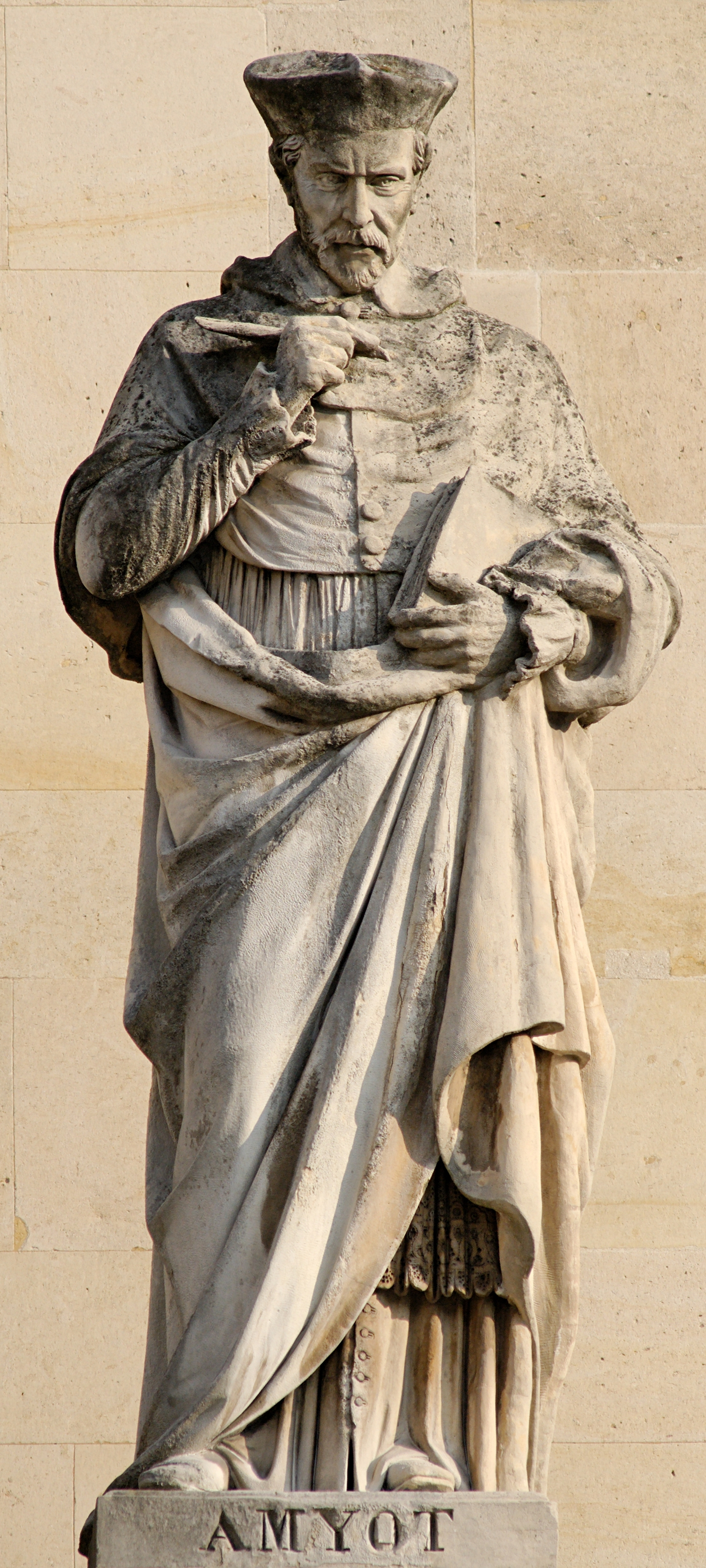

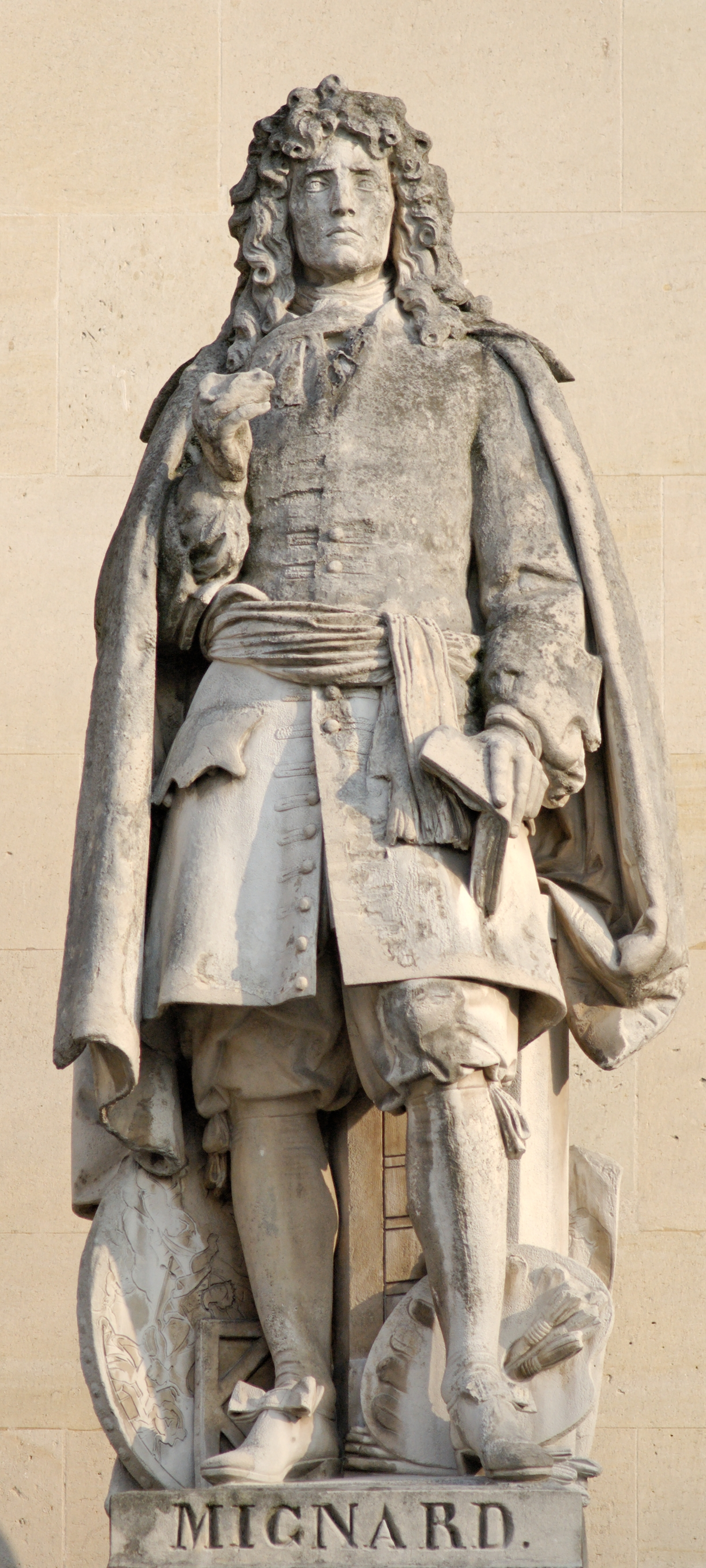

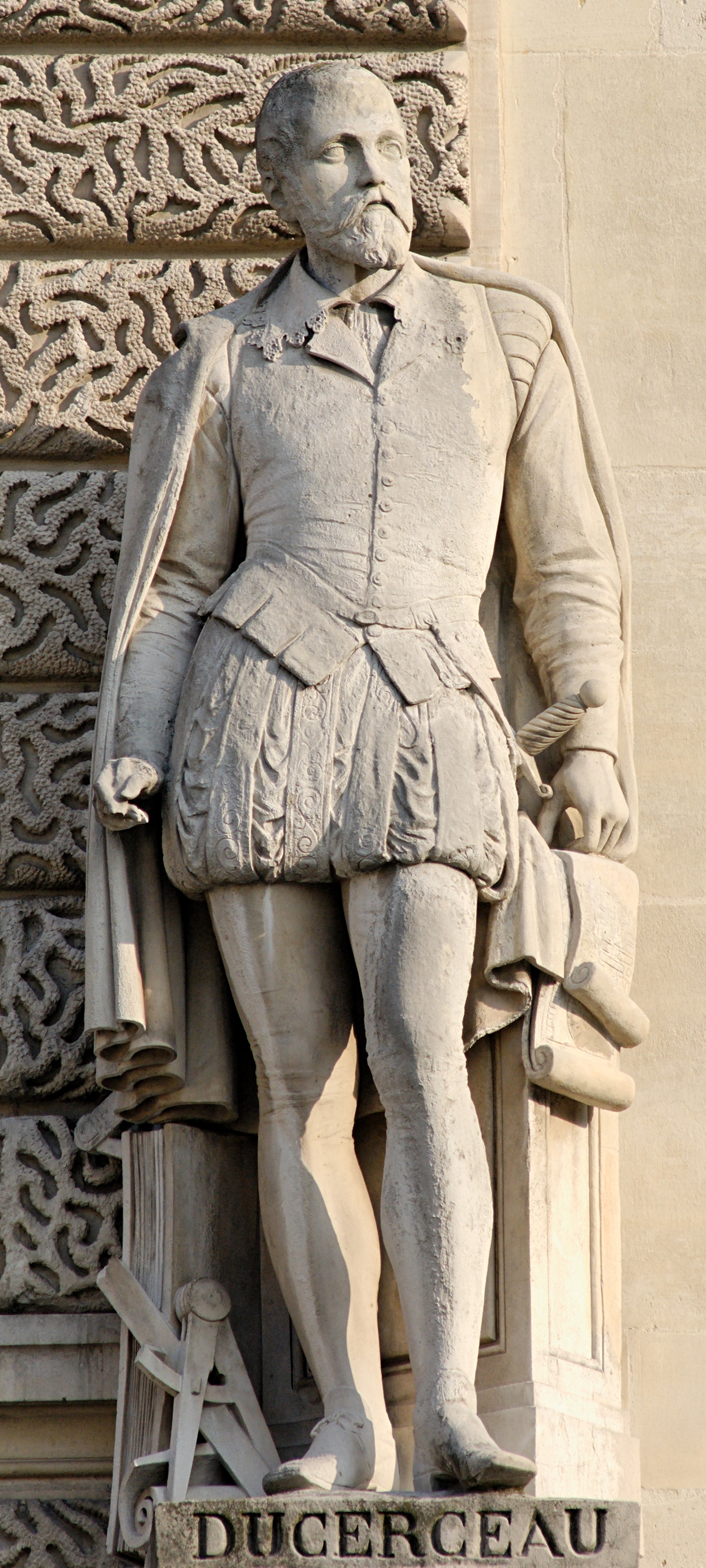

Among the abundant architectural sculpture of the Nouveau Louvre, the pediments of the three main pavilions stand out:

- Pavillon Richelieu: "France distributing crowns to its worthiest children", by Francisque Joseph Duret (in which the figure of France has been viewed as a likeness of Empress Eugénie);
- Pavillon Sully: "Napoleon I above History and Arts", by Antoine-Louis Barye and Pierre-Charles Simart;
- Pavillon Denon: "Napoleon III surrounded by Agriculture, Industry, Commerce and the Fine Arts", by Simart.

The latter group includes the depiction of a steam locomotive, then representing cutting-edge technological progress, and the only surviving public portrayal of Napoleon III in Paris.

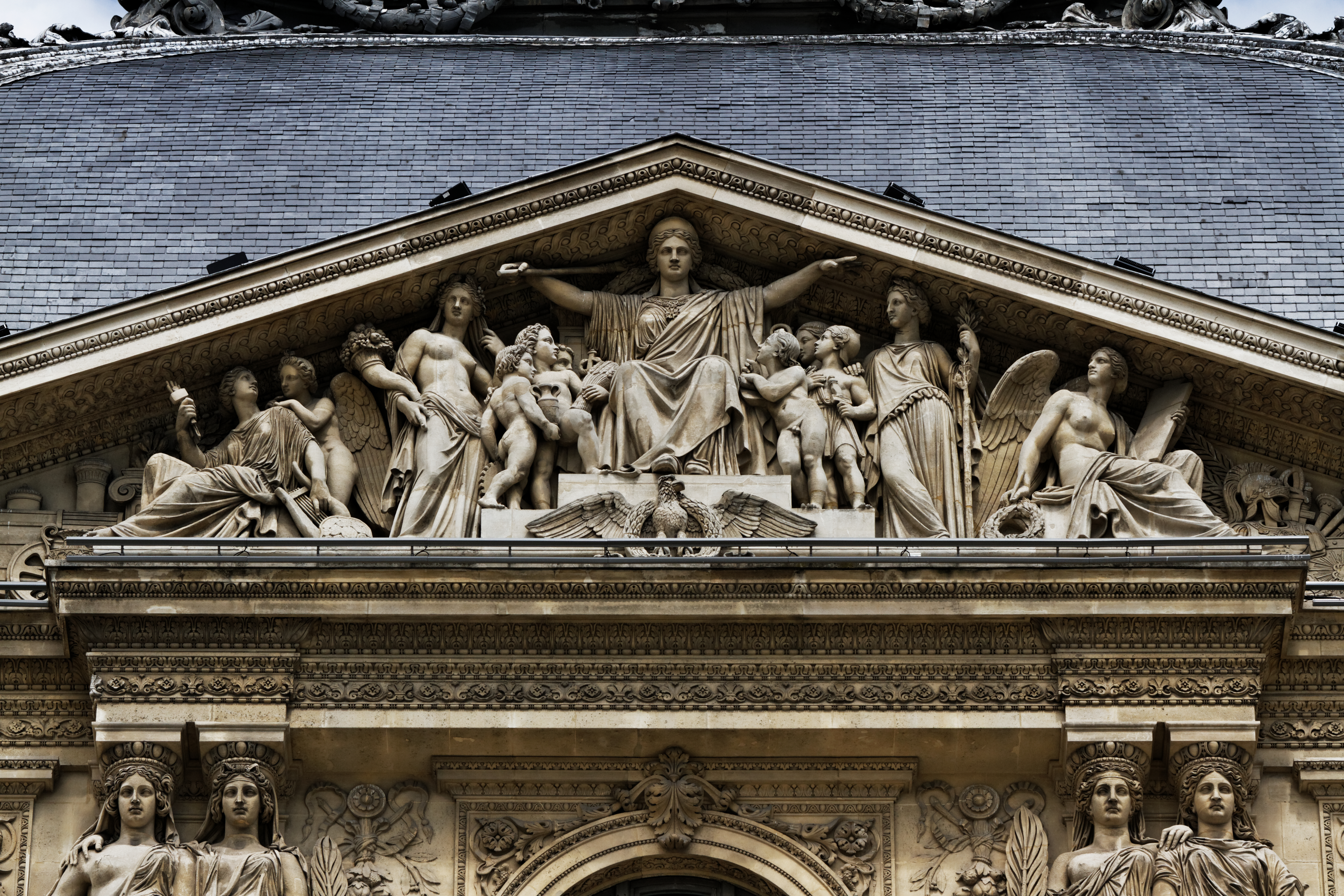
Pediment, Pavillon Richelieu

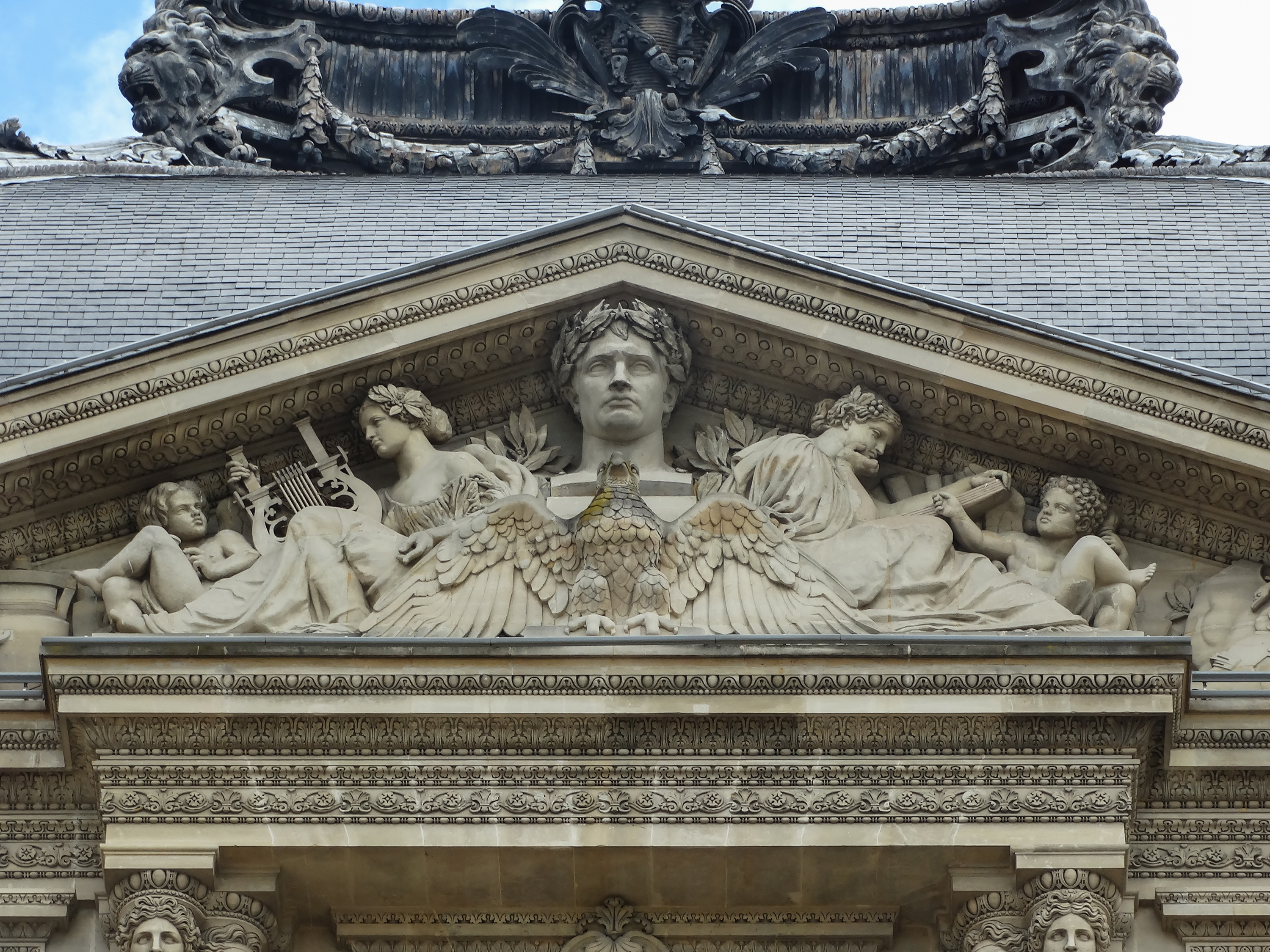
Pediment, Pavillon Sully

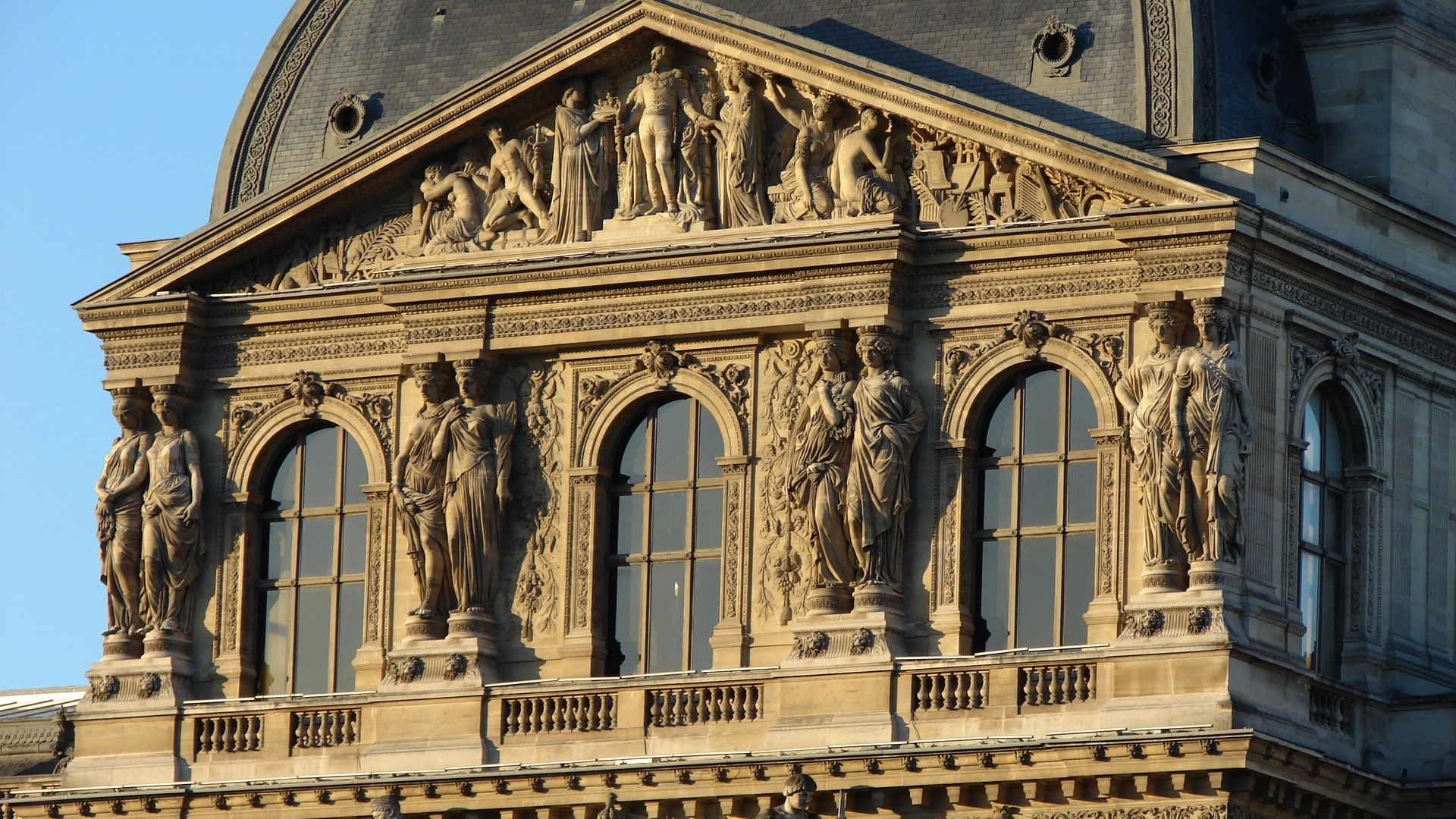
Pediment, Pavillon Denon

The South Wing's salle du Manège was another opportunity for Lefuel to foster a rich structural program, which was executed in 1861 after the Nouveau Louvre's inauguration. Outside in the Cour Lefuel, four bronze groups of wild animals by Pierre Louis Rouillard stand at the start of the two horse ramps : Chienne et ses petits, Loup et petit chien, Chien combattant un loup, and Chien combattant un sanglier. At the top of the ramps above the entrance to the manège, a monumental group, also by Rouillard, features three surging horses that echo Robert Le Lorrain's chevaux du soleil at the Hôtel de Rohan (Paris). Inside, the idiosyncratic hunting-themed capitals feature heads of horses and other animals, by Emmanuel Frémiet, Pierre Louis Rouillard, Henri Alfred Jacquemart, Germain Demay, and Houguenade.

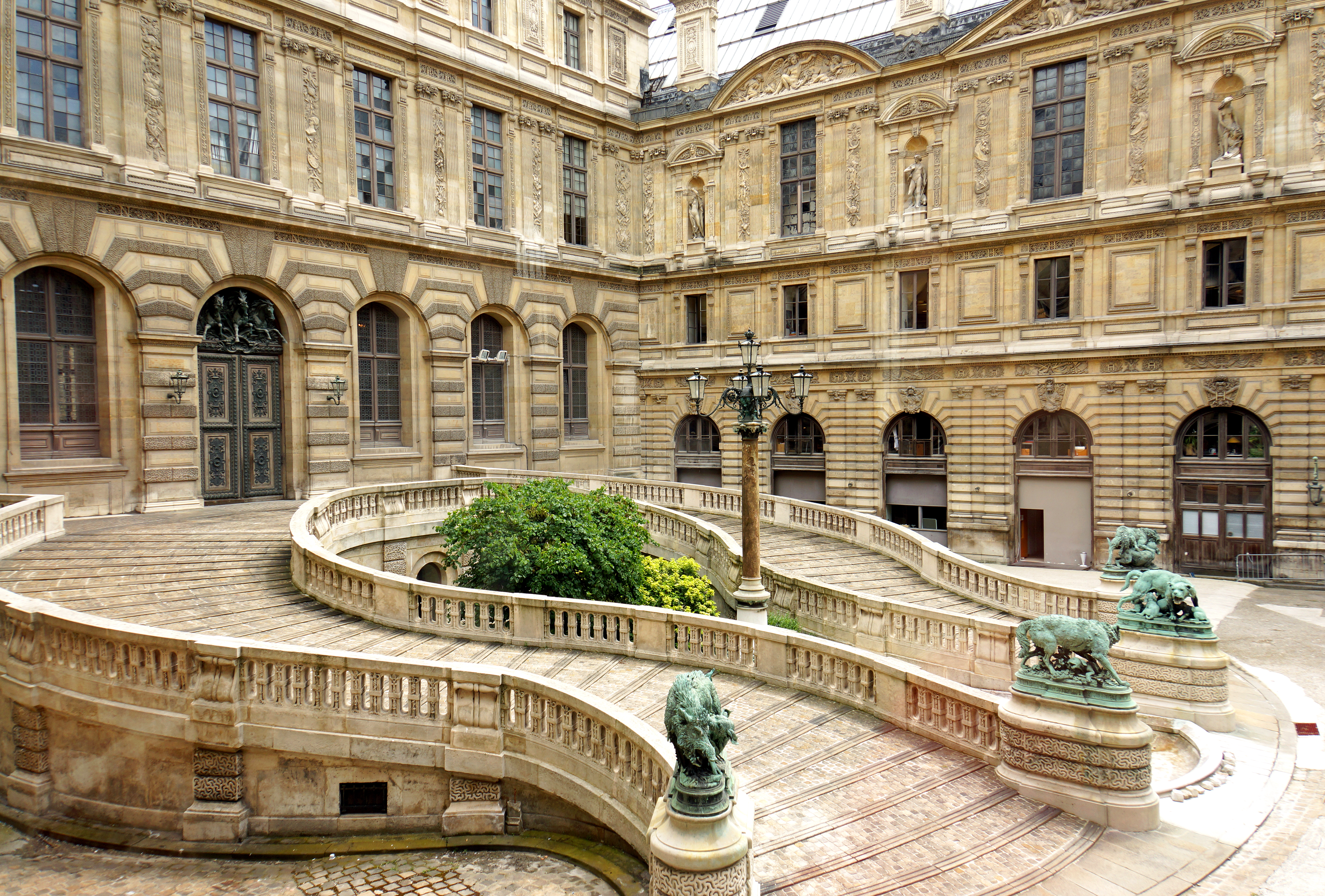
Rouillard's wild animals in the Cour Lefuel

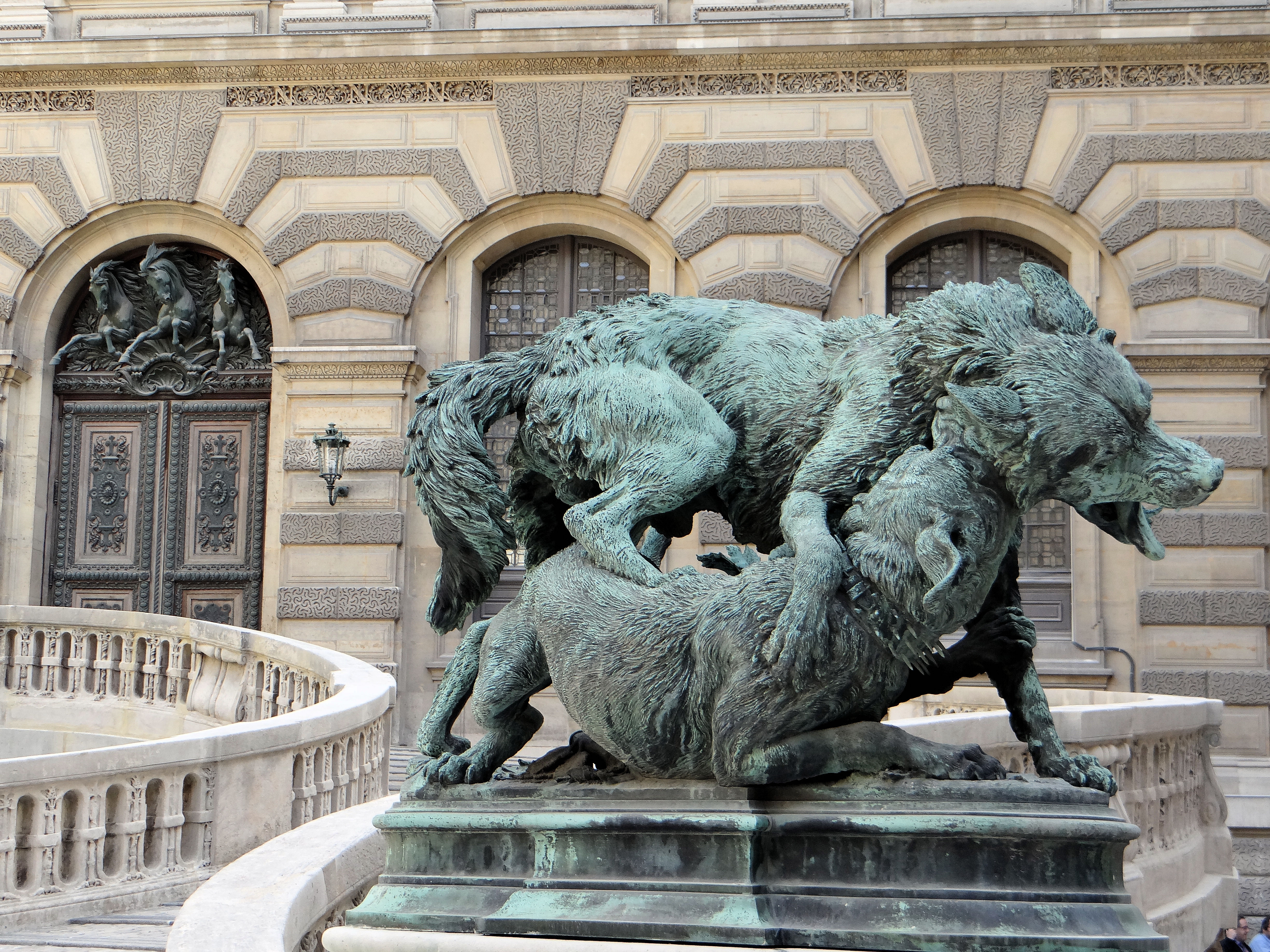
Rouillard's "dog fighting a wolf"

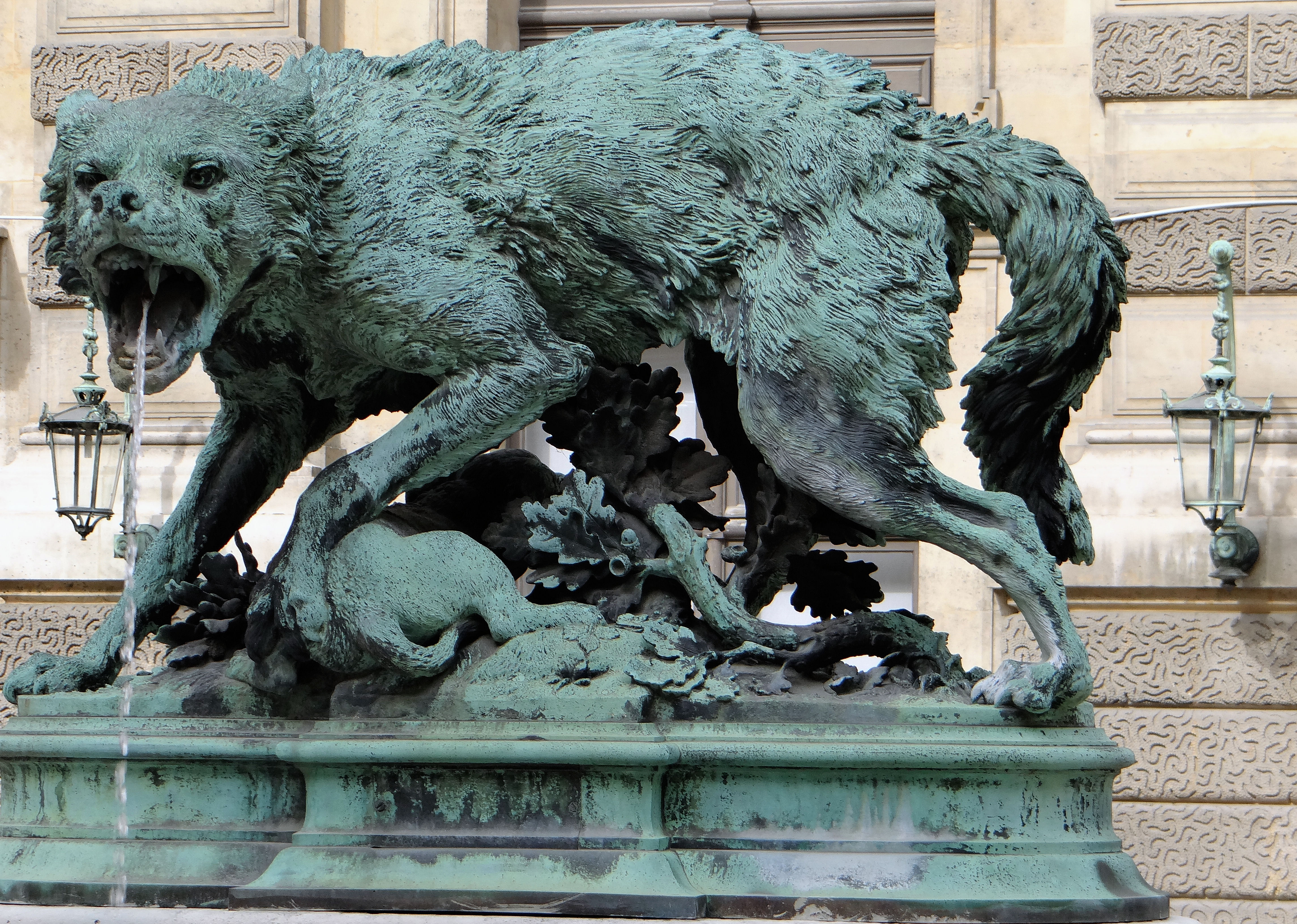
Rouillard's "wolf and puppy"

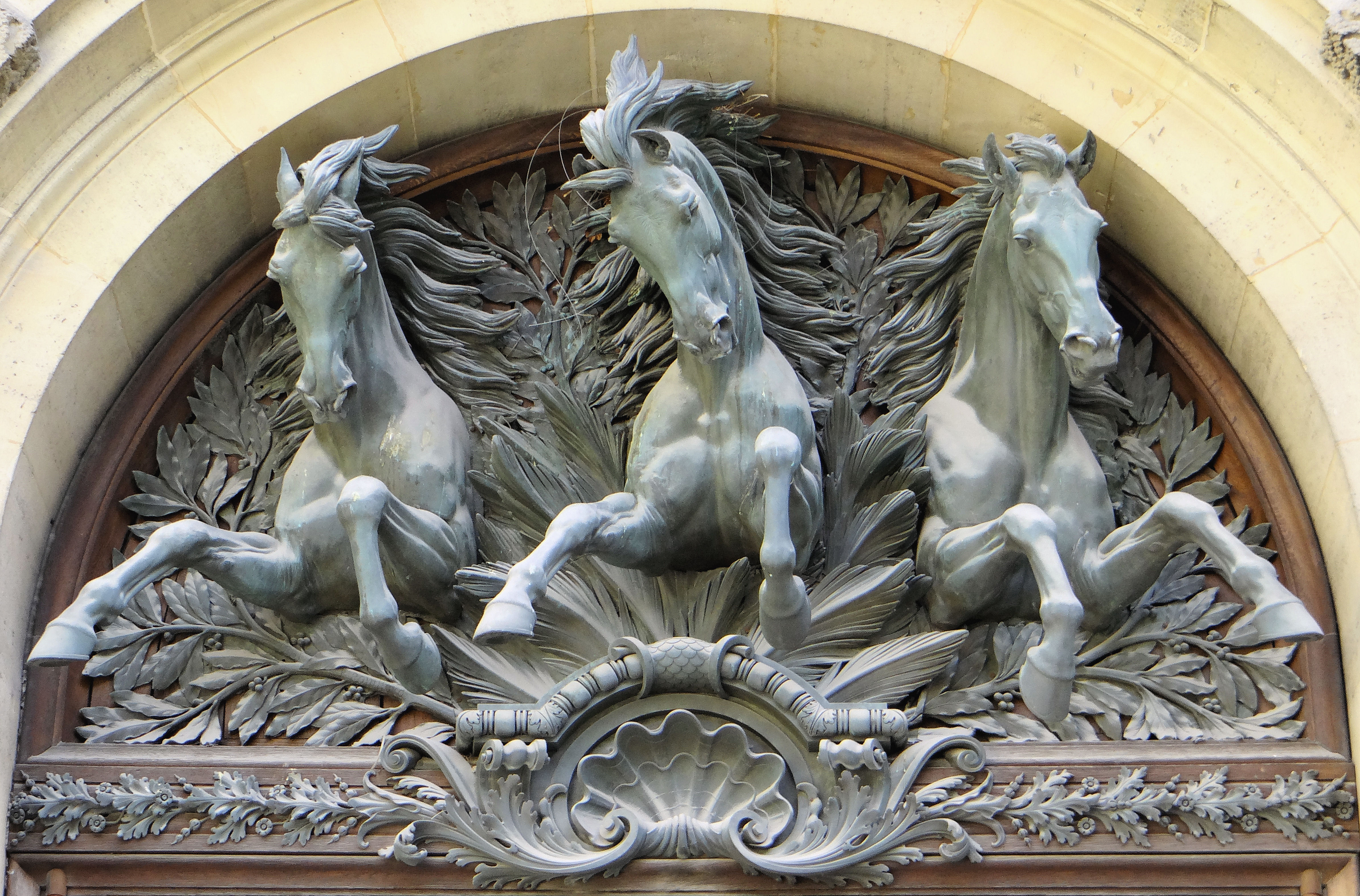
Rouillard's three horses above the Manège's entrance

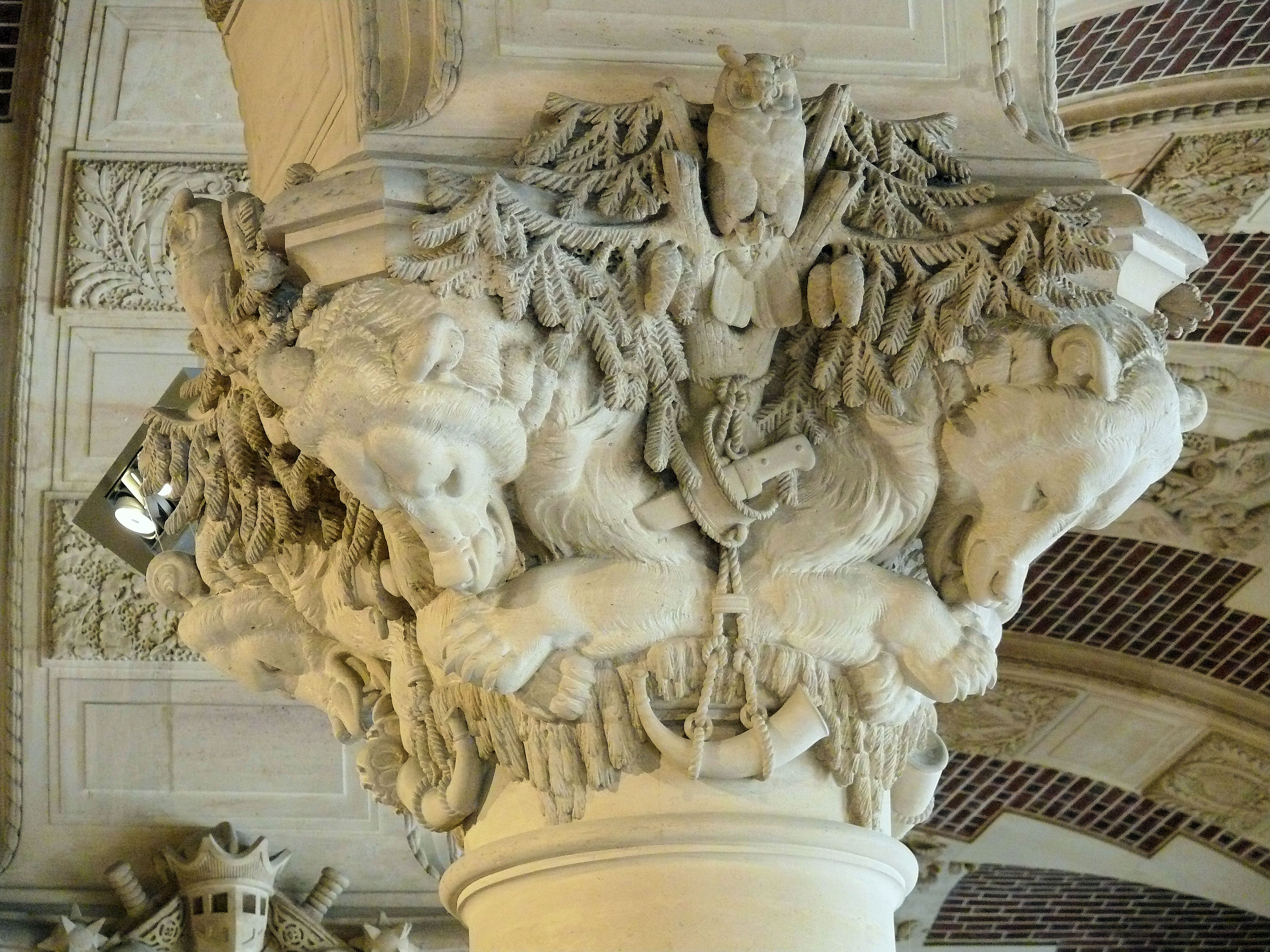
One of the capitals of the Salle du Manège

== Later history ==
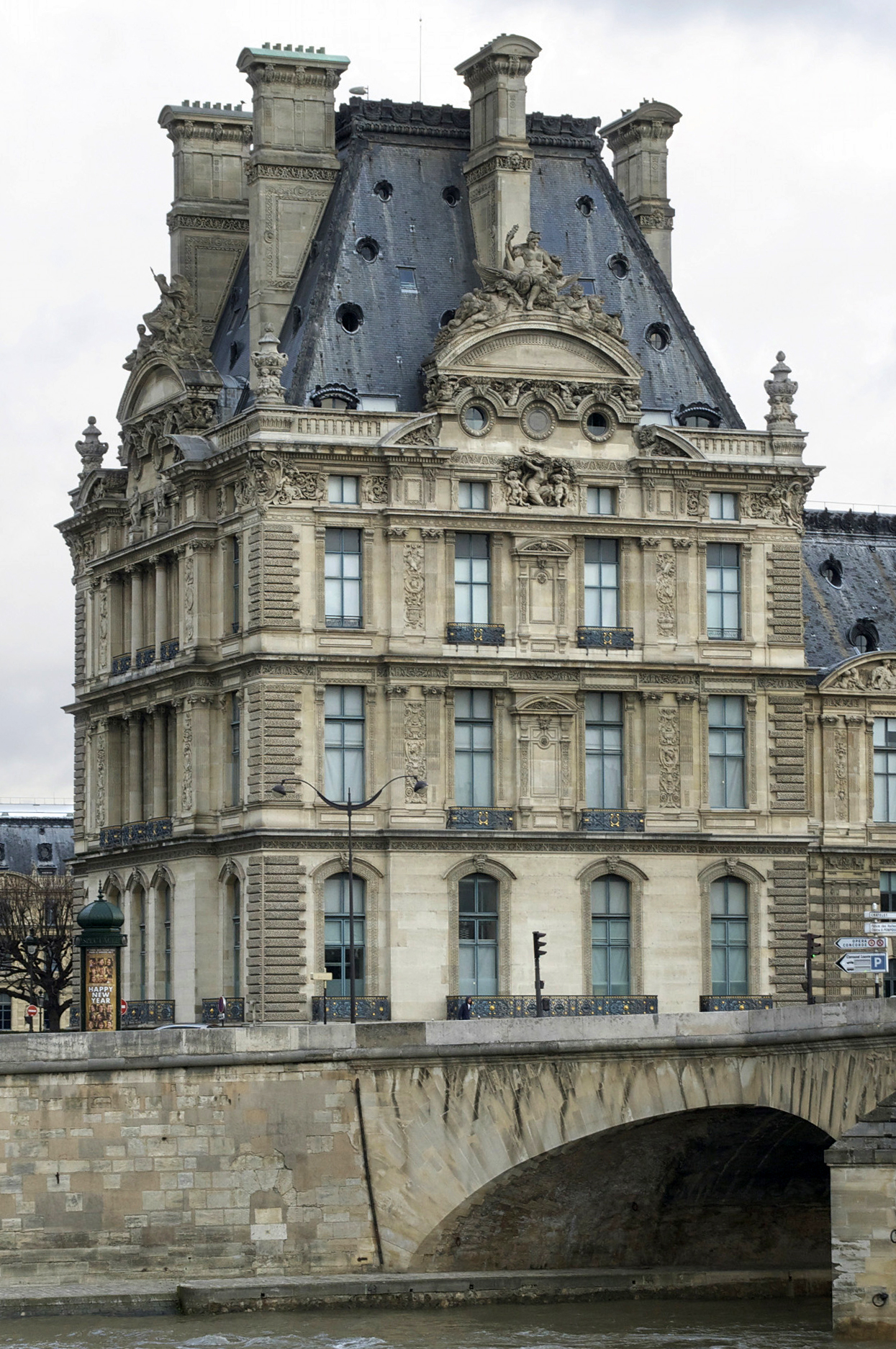
The pavillon de Flore photographed by Baldus in 1861 just before demolition (left) and Lefuel's reconstruction (right)
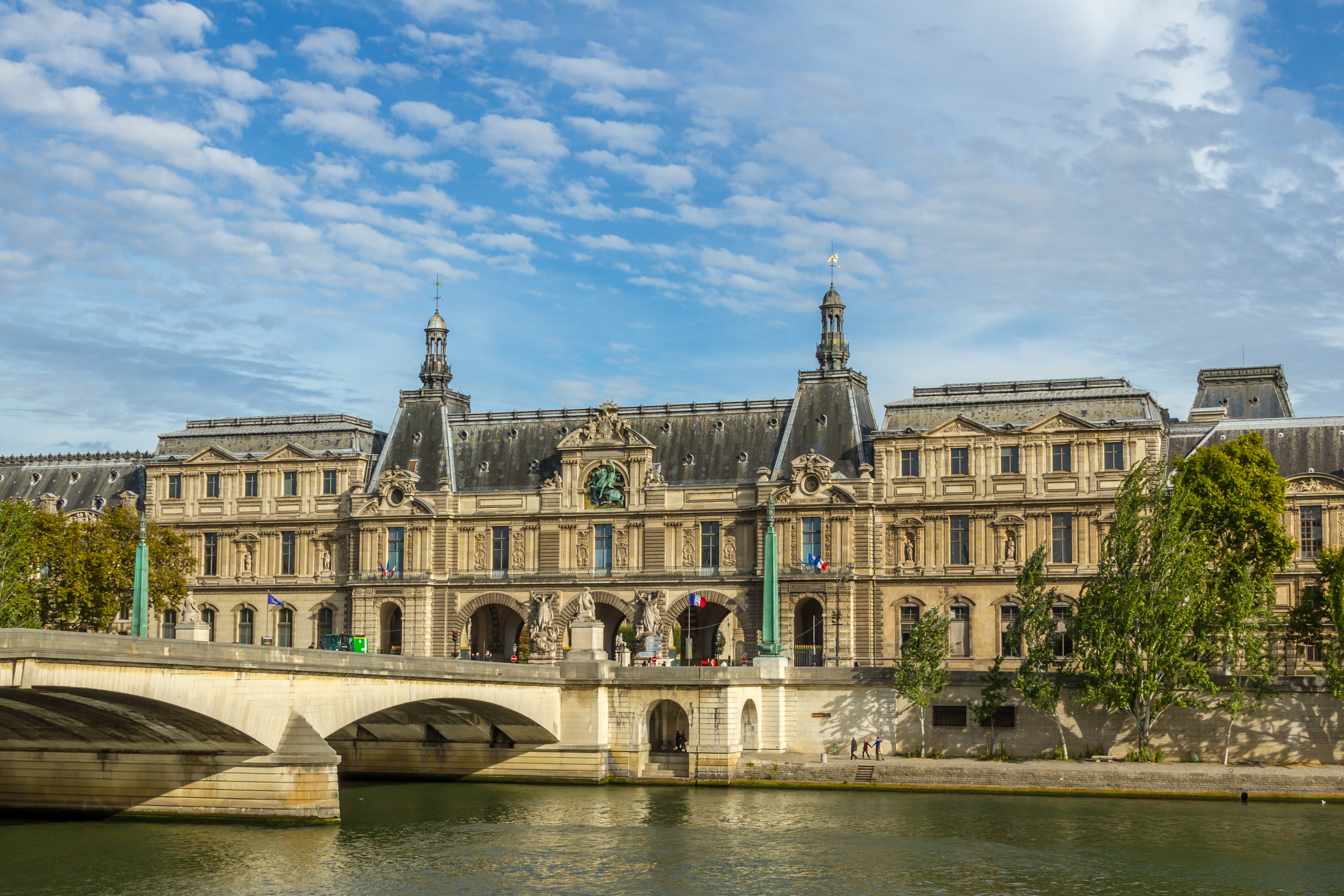
The Guichets du Carrousel, Baldus photography c.1857 (left) and Lefuel's reconstruction (right)
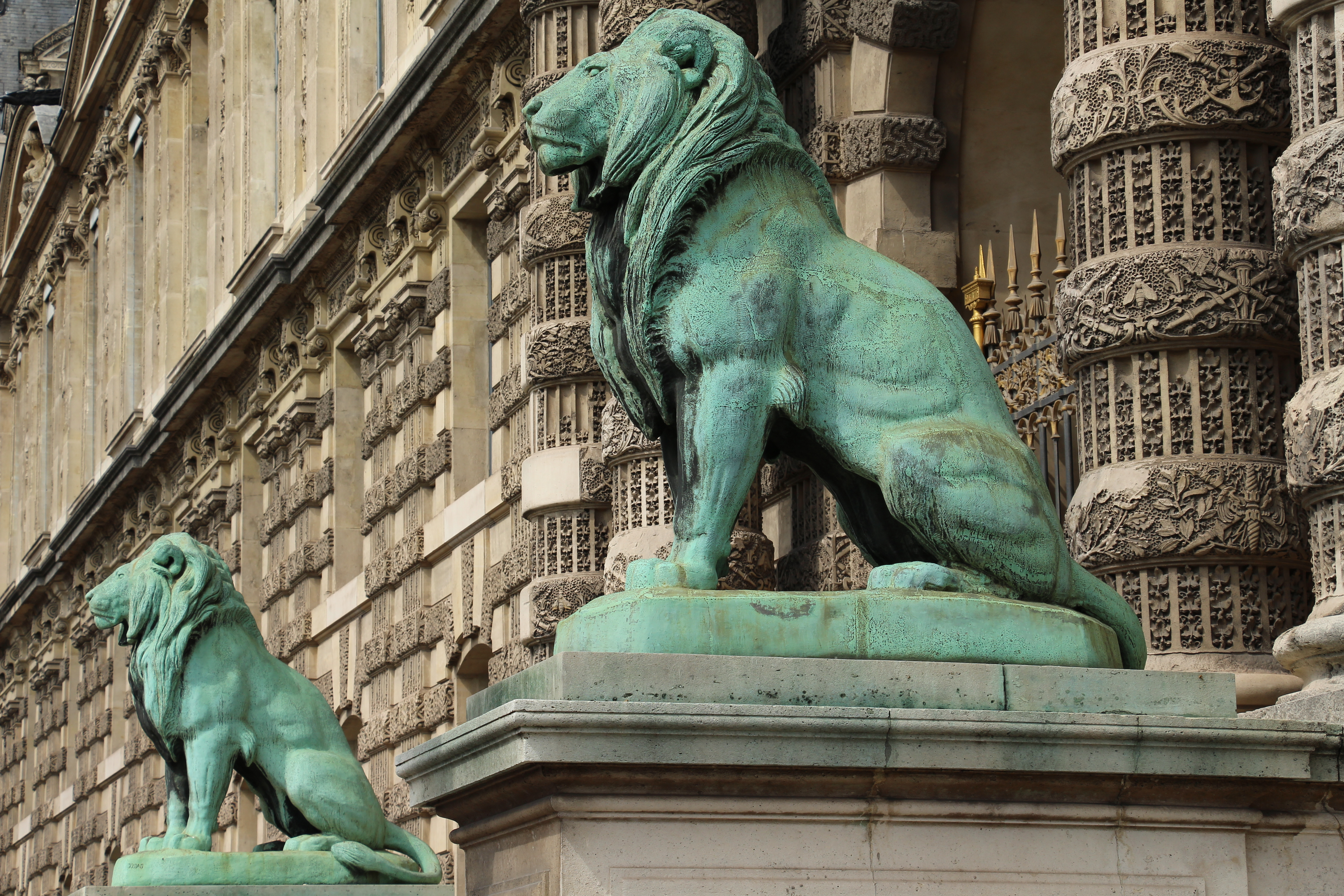
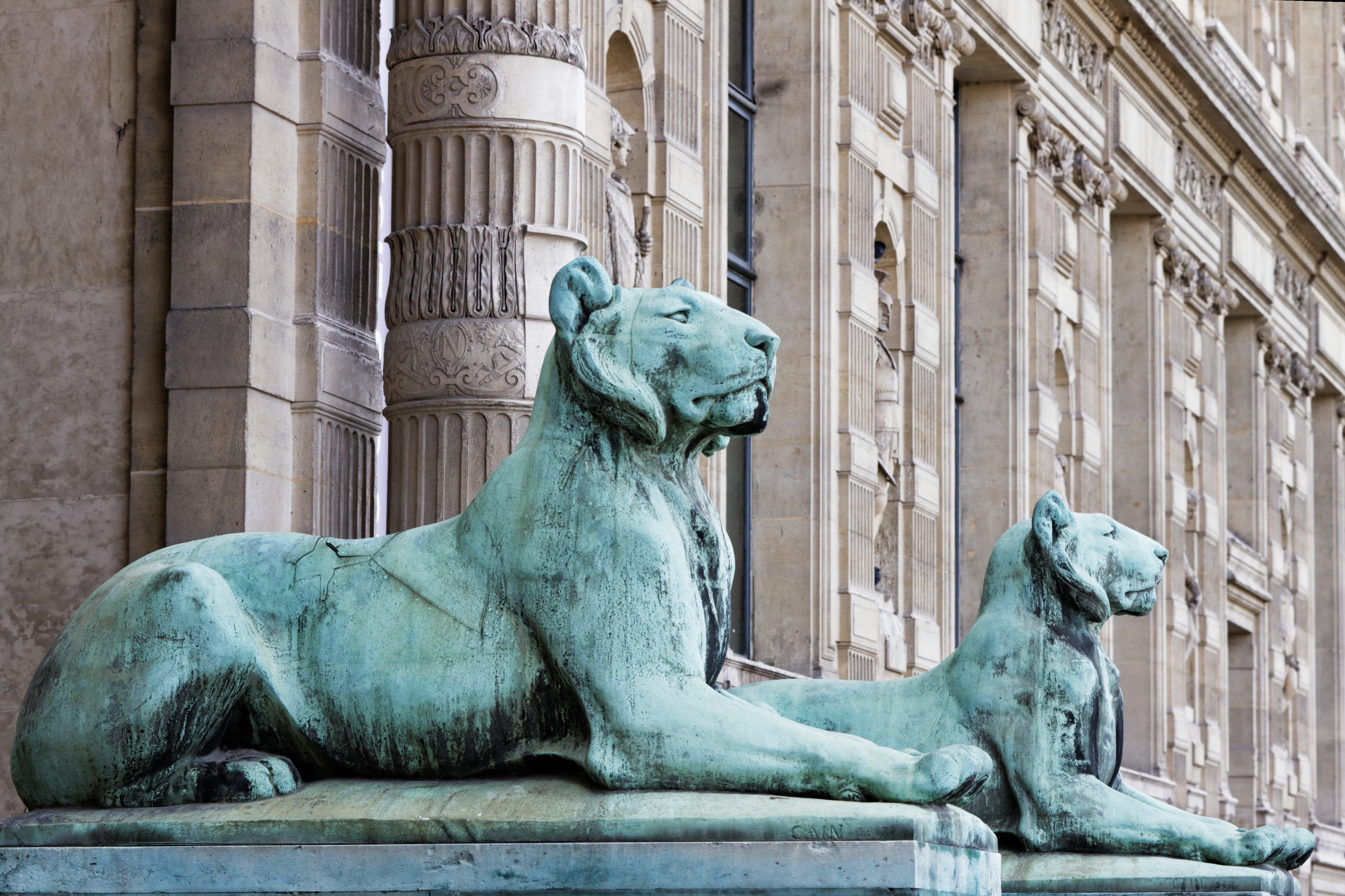
Barye's lions and Cain's lionesses, porte des Lions

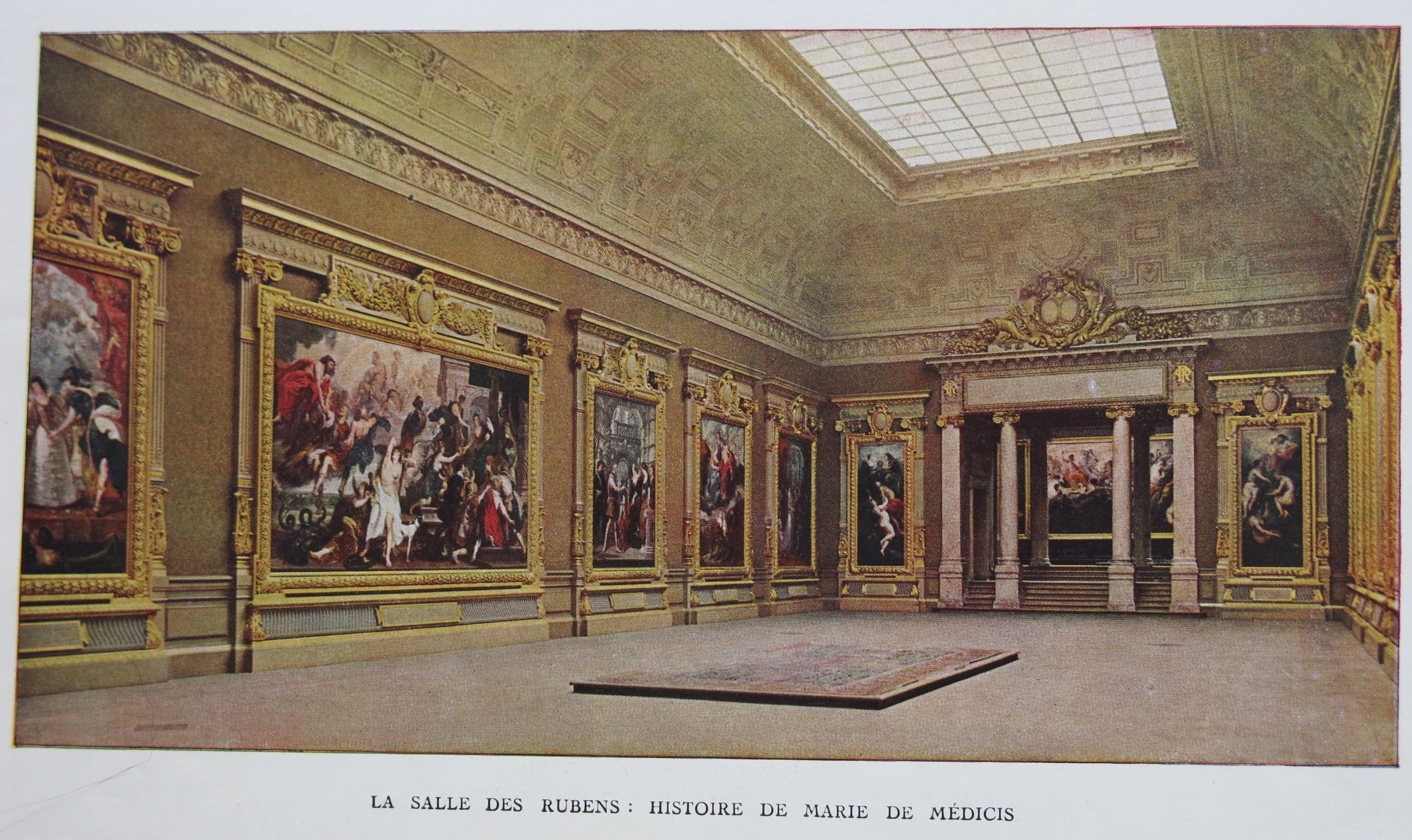
Lefuel's Salle des Sessions in the southwestern wing was used from 1900 to display the Marie de' Medici cycle by Rubens, here shown in 1929.

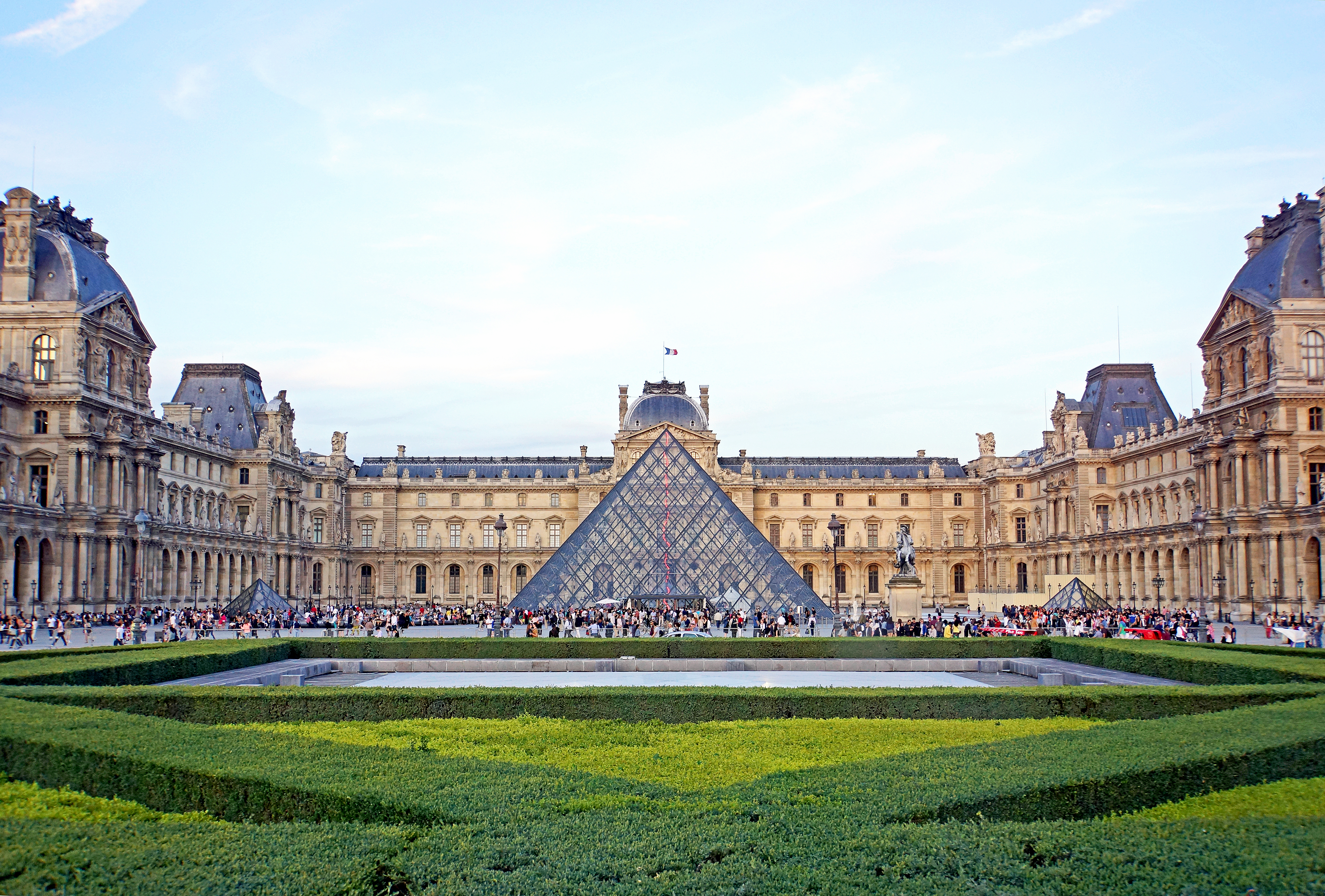
Napoleon III's Louvre expansion surrounding the Louvre Pyramid, 2014

In 1861, the Pavillon de Flore was in serious disrepair. Following the successful completion of the Louvre expansion, Napoleon III endorsed Lefuel's plan to entirely demolish and rebuild both the Pavillon and the wing that connects it to the Nouveau Louvre's South Wing. The project involved the creation of a new ceremonial salle des Etats, closer to the Tuileries than Lefuel's previous Salle des États, in a protruding wing now referred to as the Pavillon des Sessions, with covered space for 16 carriages and 32 horse teams known as the cour de l'en-cas. As this structure took the full width of the building, the Grande Galerie was correspondingly cut short by about a third. The Southern façade was completely changed, as Lefuel disliked Jacques II Androuet du Cerceau's colossal order and replacing it with a replica of the earlier design attributed to Louis Métezeau further east. Between the Pavillon de Flore and the Pavillon des Sessions, Lefuel created a monumental passageway (then called the Guichet de l'Empereur, now Porte des Lions) between 1864 and 1869, adorned with two pairs of monumental lions by Antoine-Louis Barye to the south and lionesses by Auguste Cain to the north, with two additional lionesses by Cain in front of the nearby porte Jaujard. At the eastern end of the new project, Lefuel created three monumental archways for the thoroughfare connecting the Pont du Carrousel to the south with the rue de Rohan to the north, known as the guichets du Carrousel or grands guichets du Louvre. The project was completed in 1869 as an equestrian statue of Napoleon III by Barye was placed above the arches of the Grands Guichets.

That setting, however, did not last long, as the Second Empire came to its abrupt end. On 6 September 1870, days after the Emperor's capture at the Battle of Sedan, Barye's equestrian statue was topped and destroyed. At the end of the Paris Commune on 23 May 1871, the Tuileries Palace was burned down, as was the Bibliothèque du Louvre. Lefuel, together with Eugène Viollet-le-Duc, defended the option of repairing the ruins, but shortly after both died the French parliament decided to tear them down in 1882, largely for political motives associated with the termination of the monarchy. After the remains of the Tuileries were razed in 1883, the layout that had been created by Napoleon III and Lefuel was fundamentally altered.

In the context of the Grand Louvre project initiated by President François Mitterrand in the 1980s, the Ministry of the Economy and Finance was compelled to leave the Louvre's North Wing, in which it had been headquartered since 1871, to specially-built headquarters in the Bercy area. While most of the interior spaces were gutted and rebuilt, the more artistically and historically significant ones were preserved and renovated. These included three monumental staircases, the escalier Lefuel, escalier du ministre and escalier Colbert; the former ministerial office, rebranded as Café Richelieu; and the palatial suite of rooms created by Lefuel and his team for the Minister of State, rebranded as appartements Napoléon III. The Café Marly, located outside of the Louvre Museum in the same wing and opened in 1994, has been designed by Olivier Gagnère in a reinterpretation of the Second Empire style. Meanwhile, the Cour Napoléon was radically transformed with the erection of the Louvre Pyramid.

== Influence ==
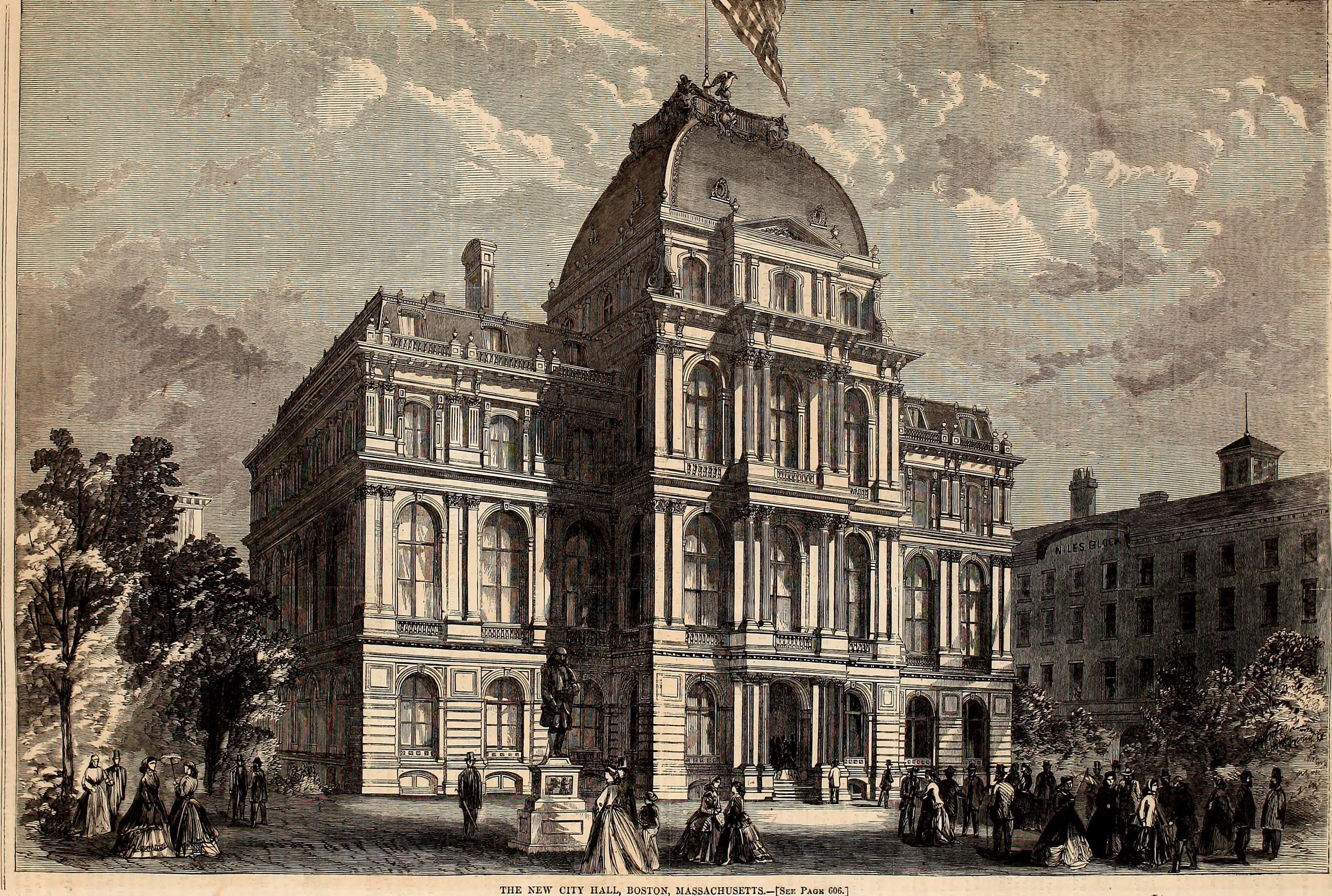
Old City Hall (Boston), 1865

The nouveau Louvre was highly influential and became the exemplar of the Second Empire style architecture, subsequently adopted in numerous buildings in France as well as elsewhere in Europe and in the world. Prominent examples include the Crédit Lyonnais headquarters in Paris, the Saigon Governor's Palace in French Indochina, and, in the United States, the Old City Hall in Boston (built 1862–1865), the State, War, and Navy Building in Washington, D.C. (built 1871–1888), and the Philadelphia City Hall (built 1871–1901).

== See also ==
- Palais Garnier
- Grand Louvre
