= Fontaine Saint-Sulpice =

Monumental fountain in Paris

Coordinates: 48°51′03″N 2°20′00″E

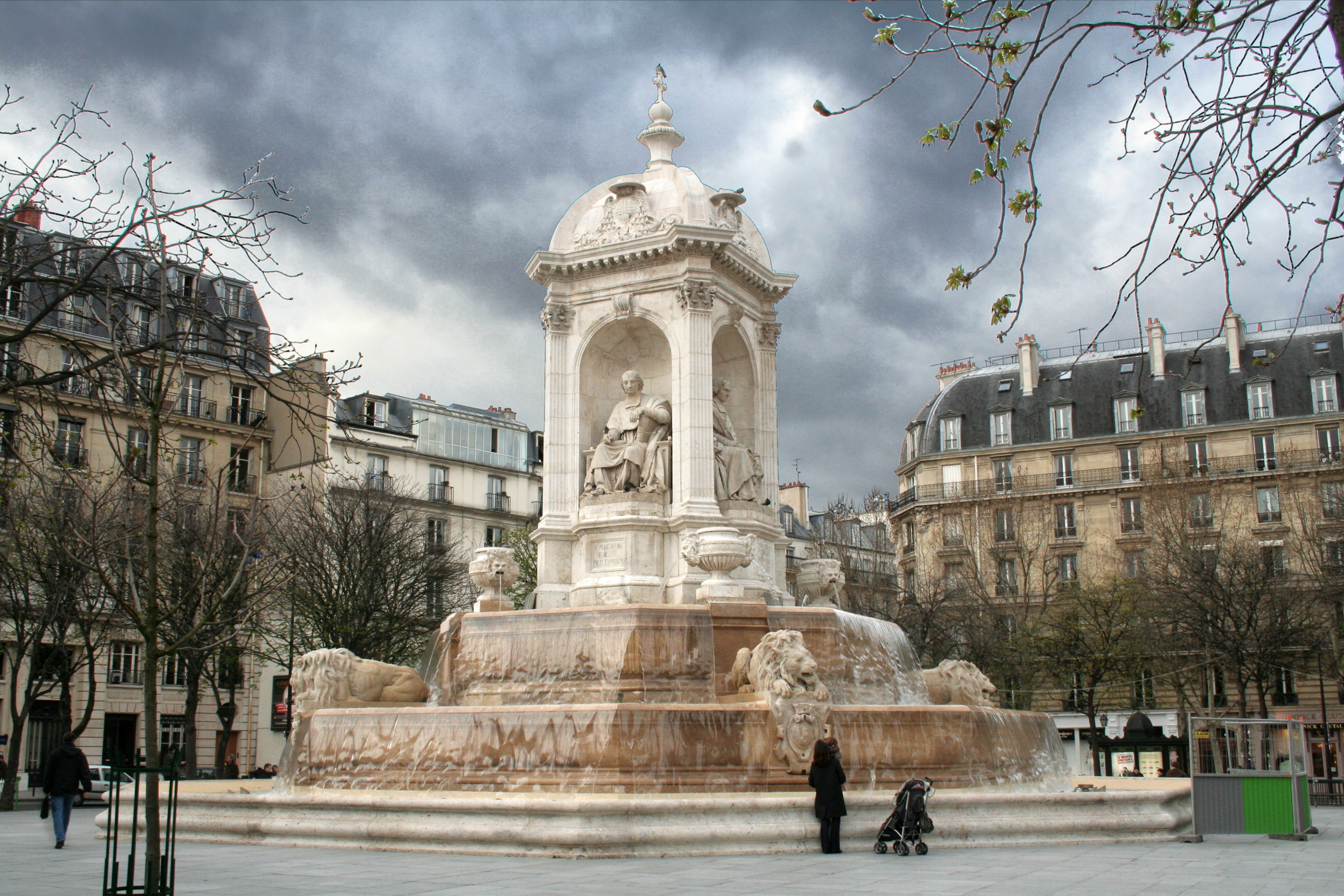
Fontaine Saint-Sulpice (1843–48)

The Fontaine Saint-Sulpice (also known as the Fontaine de la place Saint-Sulpice or as the Fontaine des Orateurs-Sacrés) is a monumental fountain located in Place Saint-Sulpice in the 6th arrondissement of Paris. It was constructed between 1843 and 1848 by the architect Louis Visconti, who also designed the tomb of Napoleon.

The four figures on the fountain represent four French religious figures of the 17th century famous for their eloquence.

- Bossuet, North, statue by Jean-Jacques Feuchère
- Fénelon, East, statue by François Lanno
- Fléchier, West, statue by Louis Desprez
- Massillon, South, statue by Jacques-Auguste Fauginet, completed by Fouquiet after the death of Fauginet.

In French the fountain is also called "La Fontaine des quatre points cardinaux", a pun which means the "Fountain of the four points of the compass" or, in the form "La Fontaine des quatre point cardinaux", which is pronounced in the same way) "Fountain of the four not cardinals". This name is also a pun, because "points cardinaux" in French is a play on words. The four bishops portrayed in the statues, while renowned, were never elevated to the rank of cardinal.

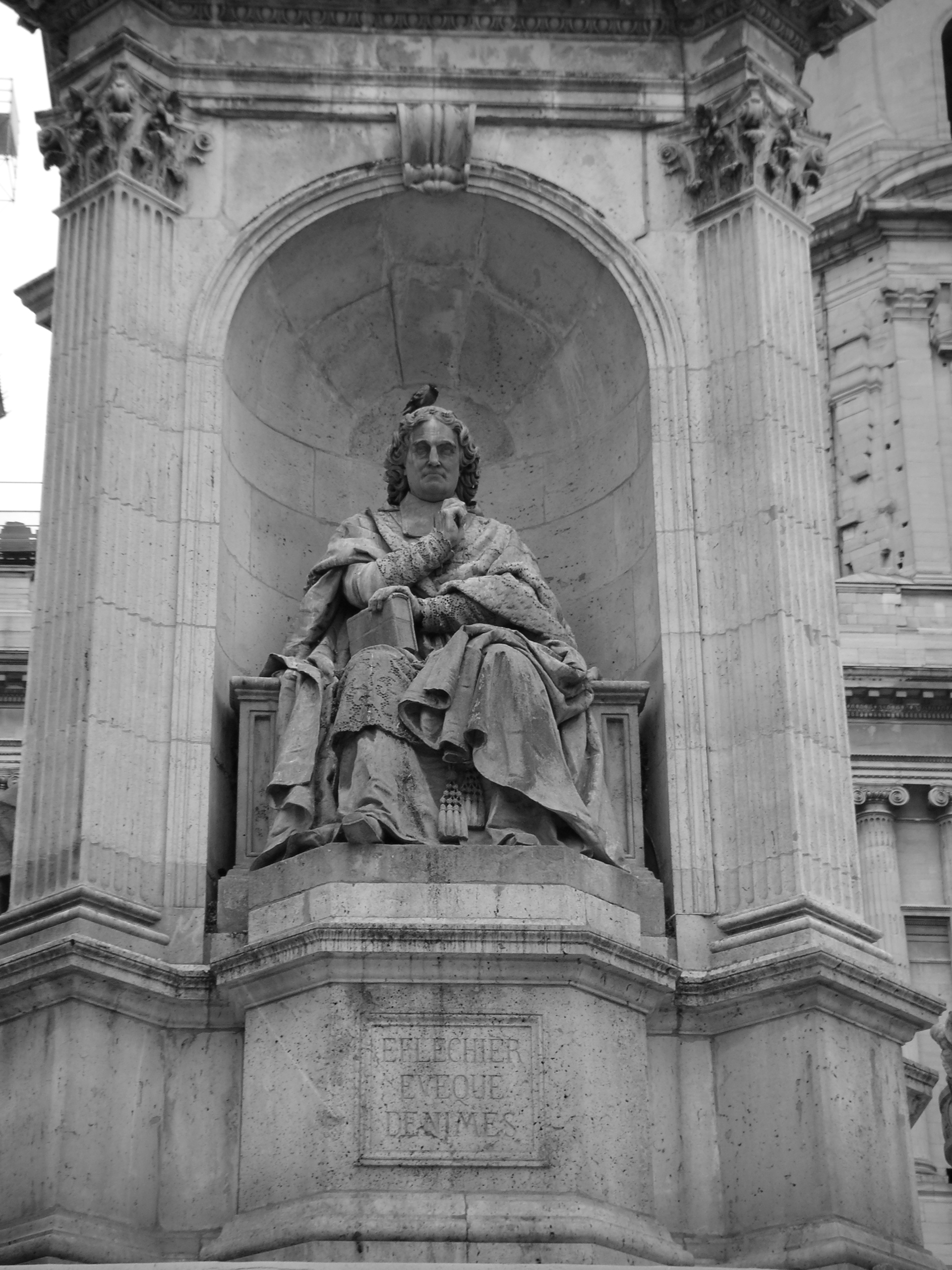
Fléchier by Louis Desprez

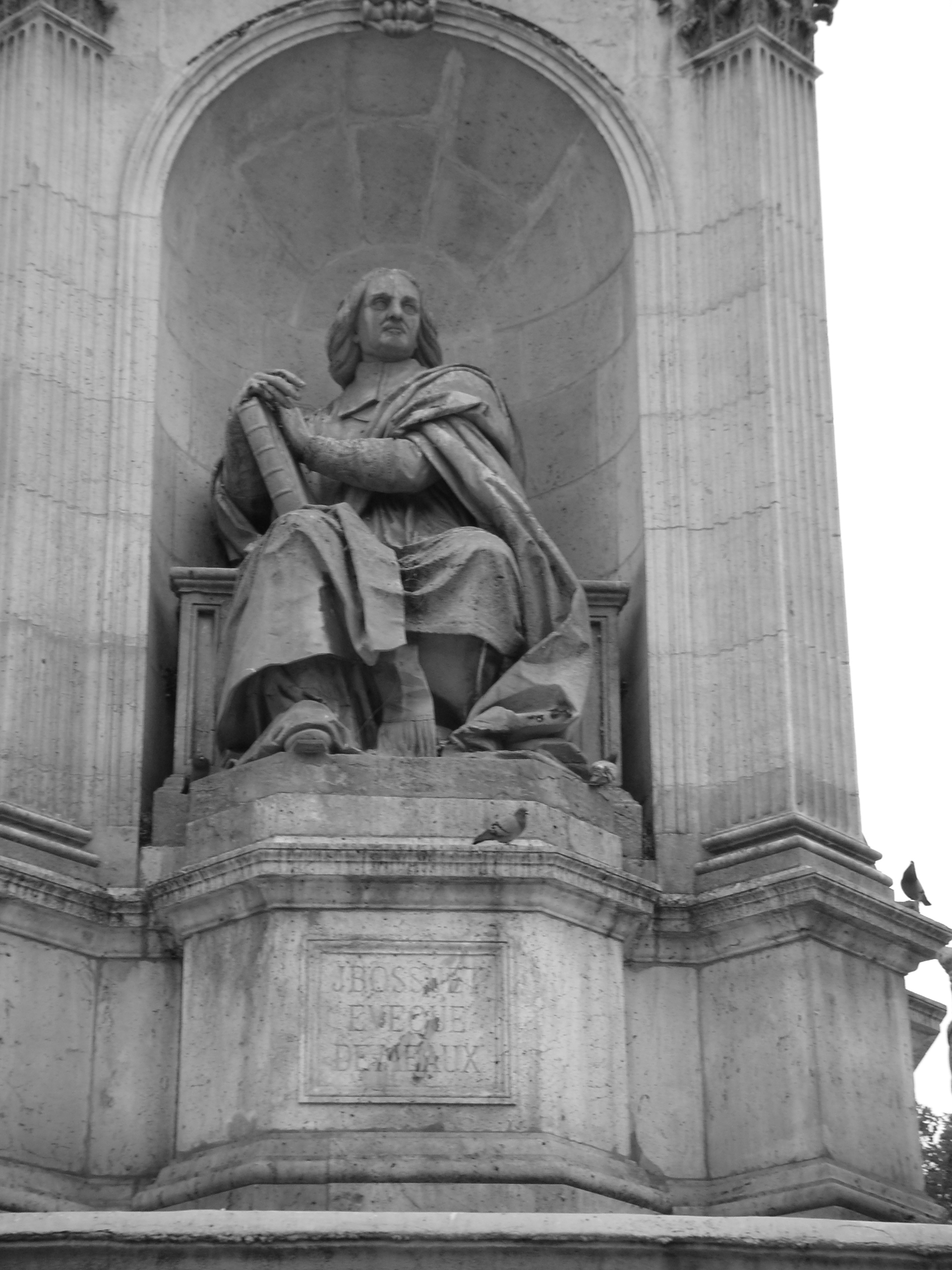
Bossuet by Jean-Jacques Feuchère

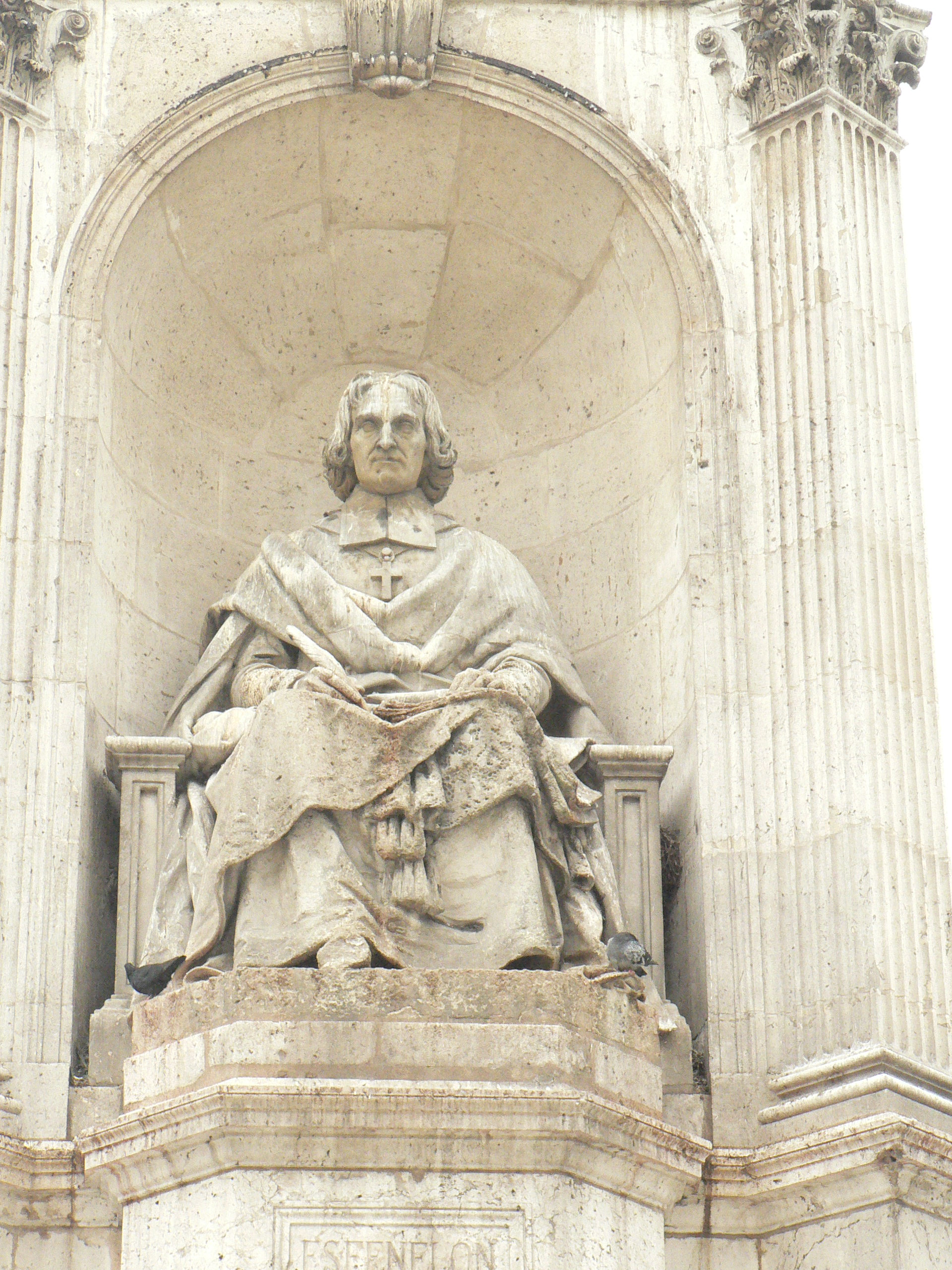
Fénelon by François Lanno

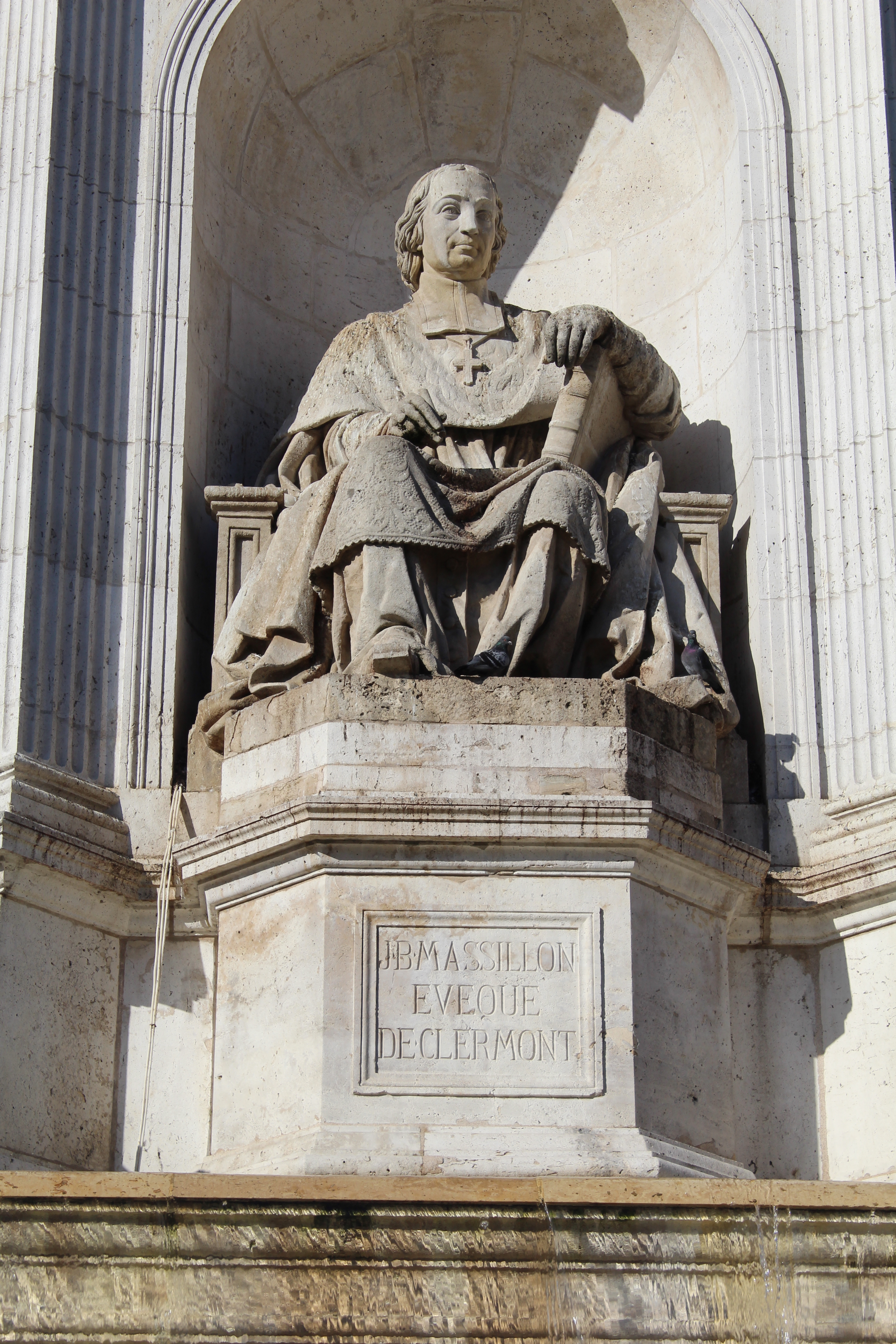
Massillon by Jacques-Auguste Fauginet

== History ==
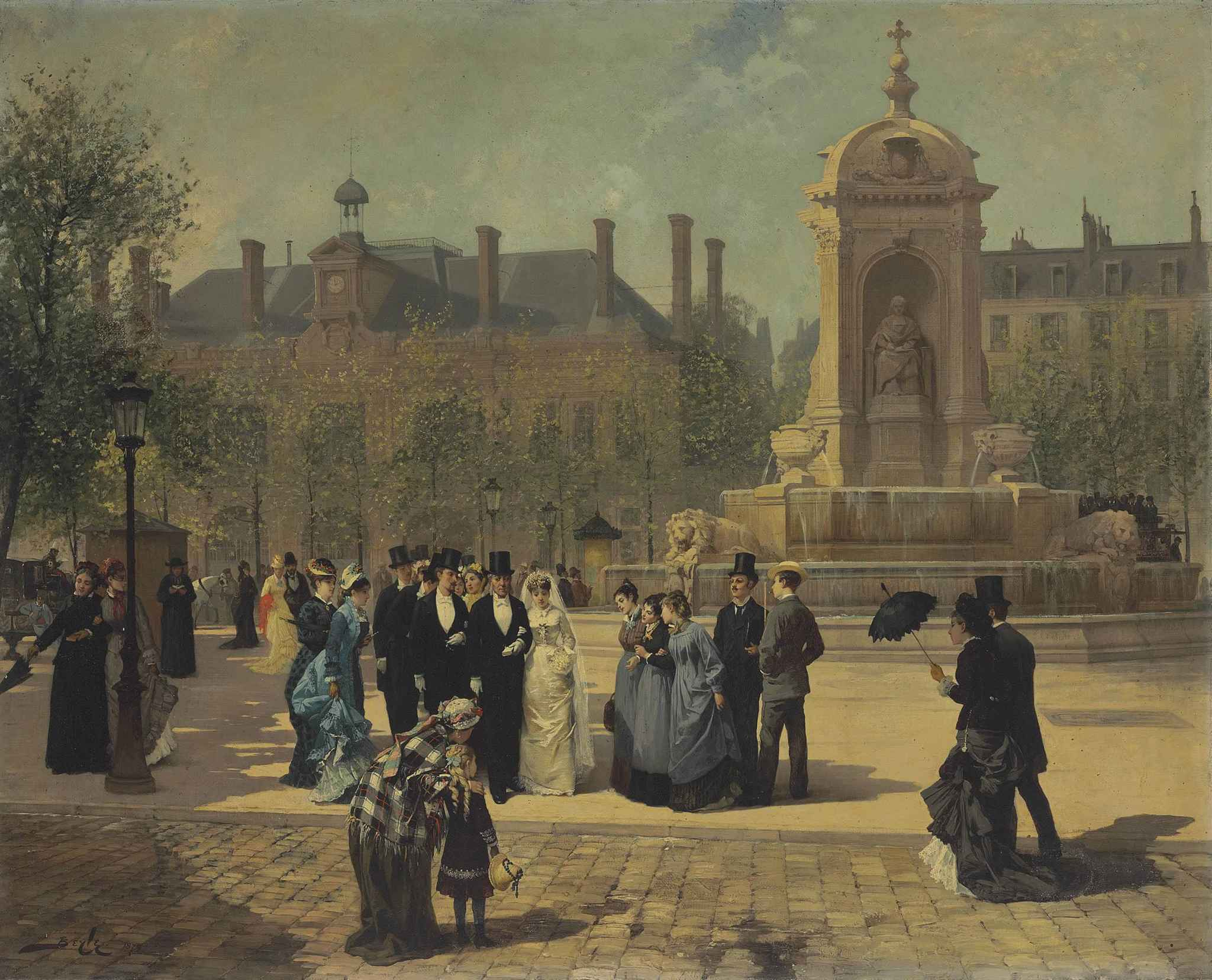
1879 painting La Procession de mariage (The Wedding Procession) by Pierre-Marie Beyle featuring Fontaine Saint-Sulpice.

The fountain was commissioned by Rambuteau, the préfet of the Seine in the government of King Louis Philippe I. Rambuteau took office in 1833 and began an ambitious program to improve the city's water supply and build new fountains. He built 200 kilometers of new water mains and 1700 small fountains to supply water, which allowed monumental fountains to be purely decorative rather than sources of drinking water. The most important monumental fountains he constructed were the Fontaines de la Concorde in the Place de la Concorde (1840), the fountains of the Champs-Élysées (1839–40), the Fontaine Molière (1841–44), the Fontaine Cuvier (1840–46), and the Fontaine Saint-Sulpice.

Rambuteau ordered that the theme of the fountain would be religious eloquence, since the fountain was placed in front of a church and near an important seminary. Visconti prepared several different projects in March 1843 to the Conseil des batiments civil. After some modifications, the project was approved and construction took place between 1843 and 1848, reaching its completed in the year when the Revolution of 1848 brought down the government of Louis-Philippe.

The final fountain had two distinct parts; the fountain itself, composed of three octagonal basins. The second basin was decorated with sculptures of lions made of stone from Derre, which had the coat of arms of Paris; and the third had pots which spouted water. The second part of the fountain was the religious structure; a quadrilateral edifice with a dome, corinthian pilasters, and four niches which contained the statues of the orators.

The fountain was criticized when it opened by critics who complained that it hid the entrance of the church and that its iconography and details were incoherent. One critic noted that the vases pouring water were "veritable cooking pots". Describing the lions, another critic wrote that "everything about them shows their irritation at the water pouring onto their rear ends".

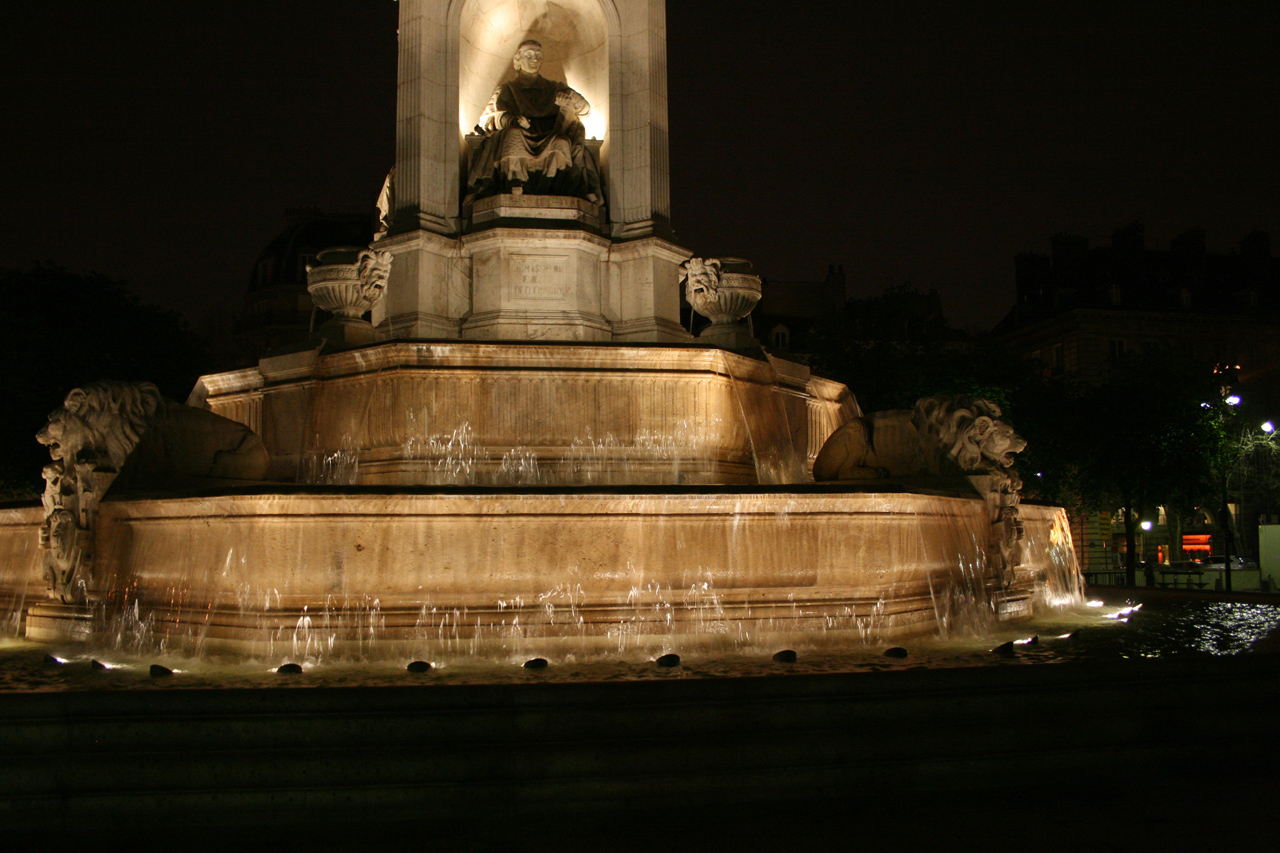
Fountain by night

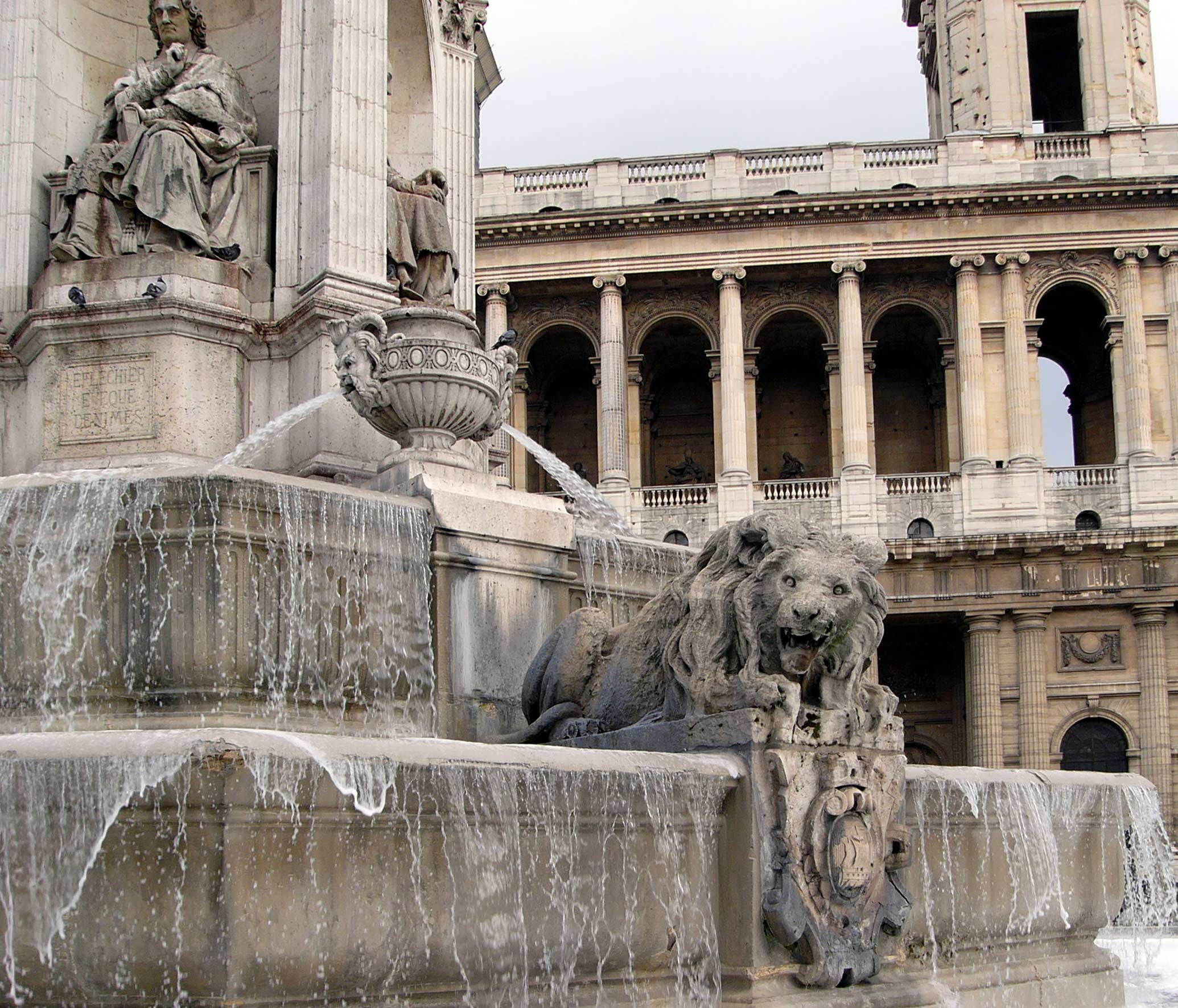
Details of fountain

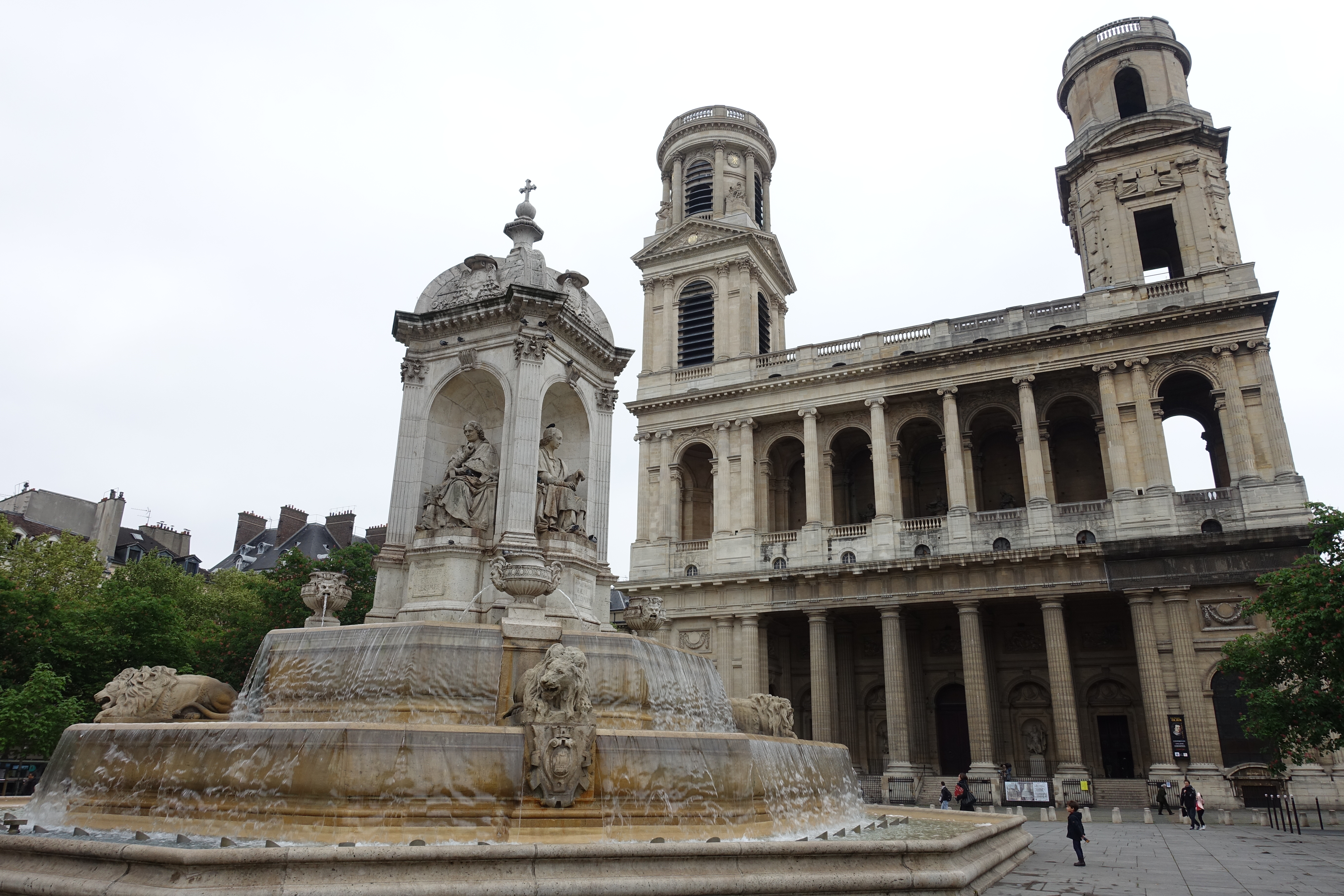
Fountain with church in the background
