= Esprit Fléchier =

French preacher, author, Catholic prelate (1632–1710)

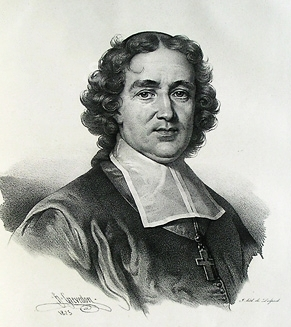
Esprit Fléchier

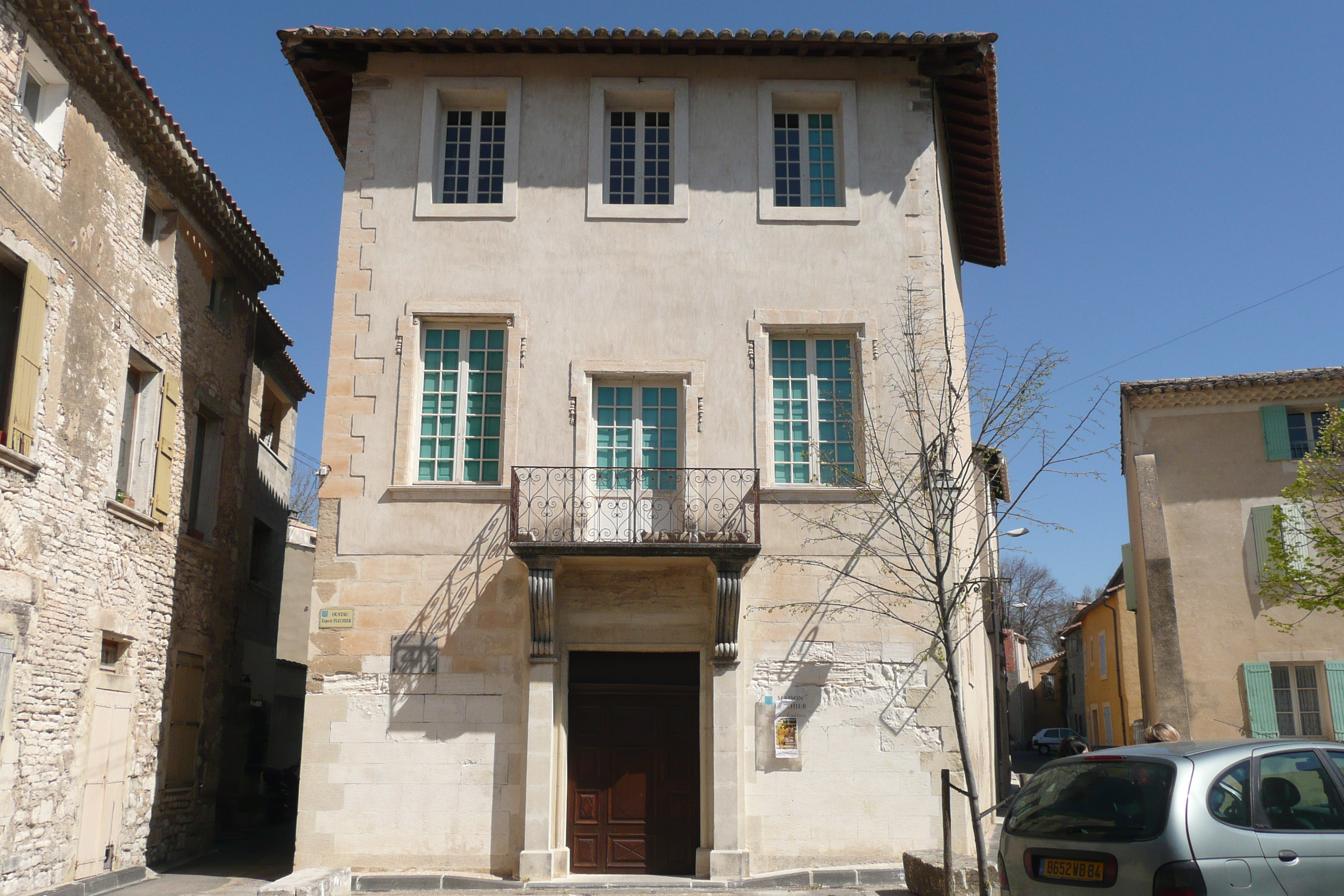
Birthplace of Esprit Fléchier in Pernes-les-Fontaines

Esprit Fléchier (10 or 19 (Note: The biographer A. Delacroix wrote "Les autres biographes disent le 10, donnant le 19 pour la date de son baptême. J'ai vu sur des manuscrits de Pernes que le jour de son baptême ne fut autre que celui de sa naissance." (Other biographers say the 10th, giving the 19th as the date of his baptism. I have seen in manuscripts from Pernes that the day of his baptism was none other than the day of his birth.)) June 1632 – 16 February 1710) was a French preacher and author, Bishop of Nîmes from 1687 to 1710.

== Biography ==
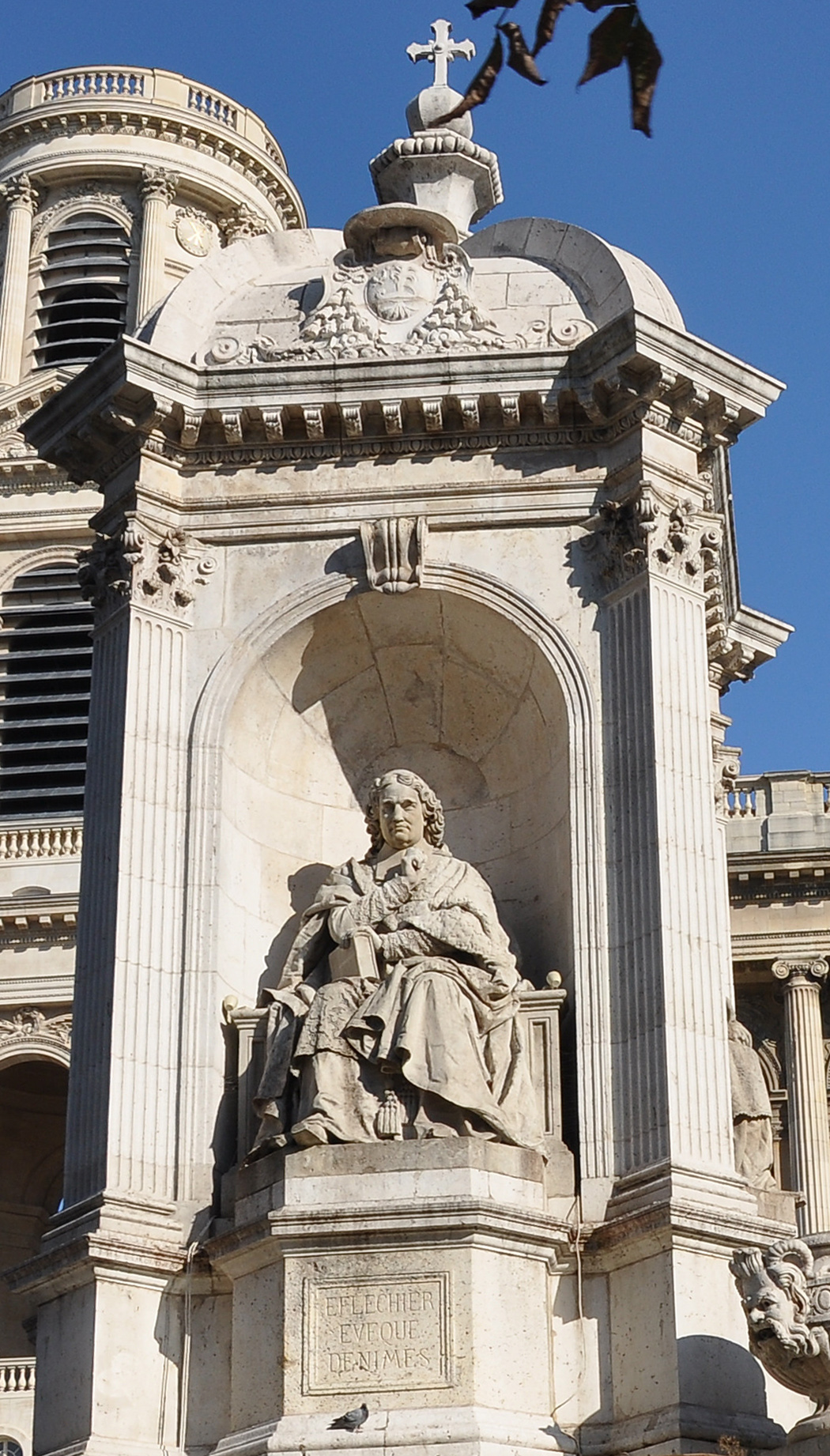
Statue of Esprit Fléchier by Louis Desprez at the Fountain of the Four Bishops, in the center of Place Saint-Sulpice in Paris.

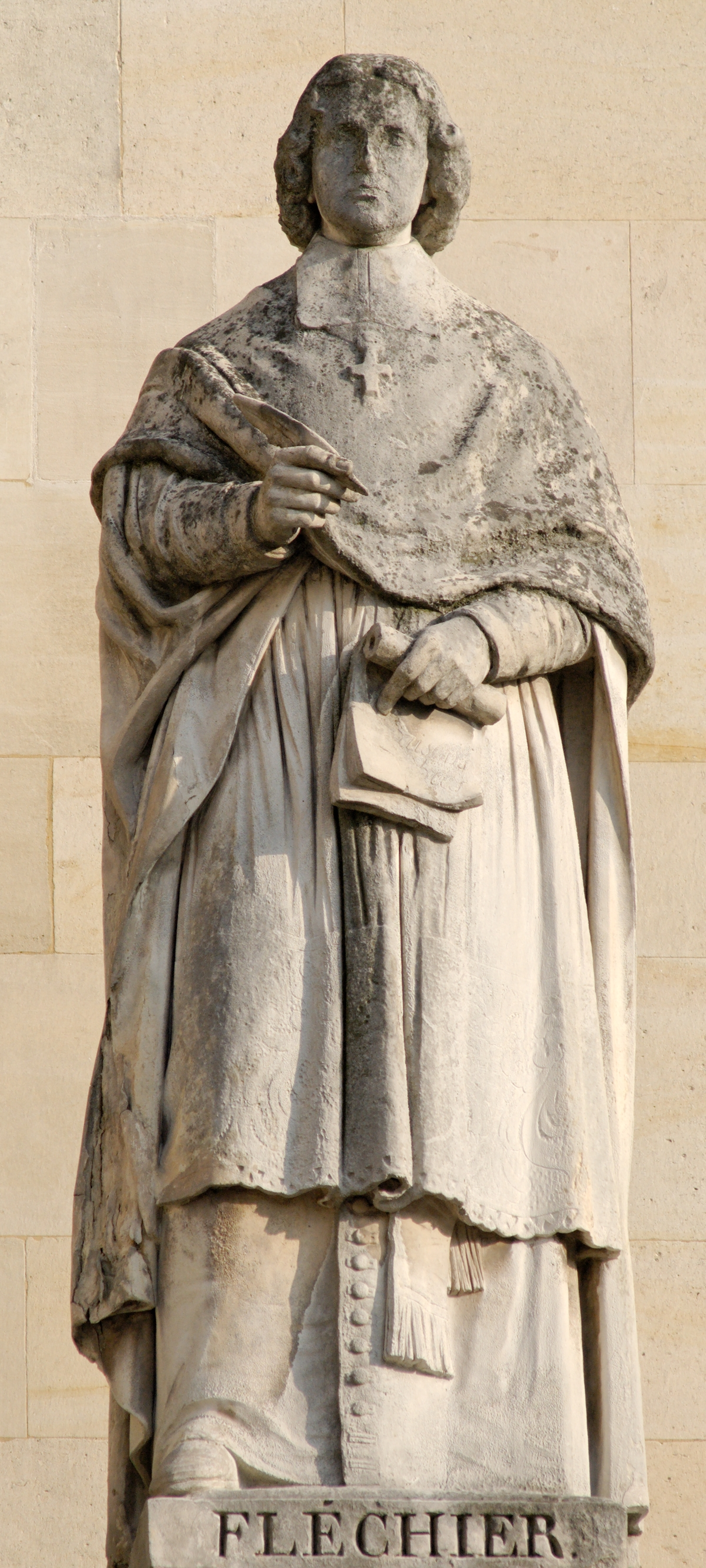
Statue of Esprit Fléchier by François Lanno, in the Cour Napoléon of the Louvre.

Fléchier was born at Pernes-les-Fontaines, in today's département of Vaucluse, in the then Comtat Venaissin, the son of Pierre-Michel Fléchier and Marguerite Audifret. He was baptized on 19 June 1632. He first went to school in Pernes and later to the Collège of Tarascon, which was run by the Congrégation des Doctrinaires, of which his uncle Hercule Audiffret was the superior.

Fléchier then entered the Congrégation des Doctrinaires as a novice on 25 August 1647 in Avignon, and pronounced his vows on 30 August 1648. At the age of 17, he went to teach humanities during four years in Tarascon and in Draguignan. He then moved to Narbonne, where he taught and stayed for six years until mid-1659.

Fléchier then went to Paris to meet his dying uncle Hercule Audiffret, but arrived after his death (16 April 1659). He left the order around the end of 1959, shortly after the death of his uncle, owing to the strictness of its rules. In Paris, he devoted himself to writing poetry. His French poems met with little success, but a description in Latin verse of a tournament (carrousel, circus regius), given by Louis XIV around 1662, brought him a great reputation.

Fléchier subsequently became tutor to Louis Urbain Lefebvre de Caumartin, afterwards intendant of finances and counsellor of state, whom he accompanied to Clermont-Ferrand, where the king had ordered the Grands Jours to be held (1665), and where Caumartin was sent as representative of the sovereign. There, Fléchier wrote his curious Mémoires sur les Grand jours tenus à Clermont, in which he relates, in a half romantic, half historical form, the proceedings of this extraordinary court of justice.

In 1668, the duke of Montausier procured for him the post of lecteur to the Dauphin. The sermons of Fléchier increased his reputation, which was afterwards raised to the highest pitch by his funeral orations. The most important are those on the duchesse de Montausier (1672), which gained him the membership of the Académie française, the duchesse d'Aiguillon (1675), and, above all, Marshal Turenne (1676). He was now firmly established in the favour of the king, who gave him successively the abbacy of Saint-Séverin, in the diocese of Poitiers, the office of almoner to the Dauphine, and in 1685 the bishopric of Lavaur, from which he was in 1687 promoted to that of Nîmes. The edict of Nantes had been repealed two years before; but the Calvinists were still very numerous at Nîmes. Fléchier, by his leniency and tact, succeeded in bringing over some of them to his views, and even gained the esteem of those who declined to change their faith.

During the troubles in the Cévennes he softened to the utmost of his power the rigour of the edicts, and showed himself so indulgent even to what he regarded as error, that his memory was long held in veneration amongst the Protestants of that district. It is right to add, however, that some authorities consider the accounts of his leniency to have been greatly exaggerated, and even charge him with going beyond what the edicts permitted. He died at Montpellier.

== Académie Française ==
Esprit Fléchier was elected at the Académie française on 5 December 1672, as a successor of Antoine Godeau. He entered the Académie on 12 January 1673, the same day as Jean Racine and Jean Gallois.

== Literary style ==
According to the Encyclopædia Britannica Eleventh Edition, pulpit eloquence is the branch of belles-lettres in which Fléchier excelled. He is indeed far below Bossuet, whose robust and sublime genius had no rival in that age; he does not equal Bourdaloue in earnestness of thought and vigour of expression; nor can he rival the philosophical depth or the insinuating and impressive eloquence of Jean-Baptiste Massillon. But he is always ingenious, often witty, and nobody has carried farther than he the harmony of diction, sometimes marred by an affectation of symmetry and an excessive use of antithesis. His two historical works, the histories of Theodosius I and of Ximenes, are more remarkable for elegance of style than for accuracy and comprehensive insight.

== Works ==
- La vie du cardinal Jean-François Commendon, où l'on voit ses voyages, ambassades, légations & négotiations, dans les plus considérables cours des empereurs, rois, princes & républiques de l'Europe. Écrite en latin par Antoine Maria Gratiani, et traduite en françois par Monsieur Fléchier (1671)
- Histoire de Théodose le Grand, pour Monseigneur le Dauphin (1679). Translated into English by F Manning (1693)
- Histoire du cardinal Ximenès (1693)
- Panégyriques des saints et quelques sermons de morale (1695)
- Lettres de Mr. Flechier, evêque de Nismes, sur divers sujets (1711)
- Lettres choisies de Mr Fléchier, avec une Relation des fanatiques du Vivarez et des réflexions sur les différens caractères des hommes (2 volumes, 1715) . Reedition : Fanatiques et insurgés du Vivarais et des Cévennes : récits et lettres, 1689–1705, Jérôme Millon, Grenoble, 1997.
- Œuvres complètes (10 volumes, 1782)
- Voyage de Fléchier en Auvergne (1796)
- Oraison funèbres (2 volumes, 1802)
  - Madame la Duchesse de Montausier, pronounced in the Church of Hyères Abbey on January 2, 1672
  - Madame la Duchesse d'Aiguillon, pronounced in the Carmelites church of rue Chapon, Paris, on August 12, 1675
  - Monsieur de Turenne, pronounced in the Church of St. Eustache, Paris on January 10, 1676
  - M. le premier président de Lamoignon, pronounced in Saint-Nicolas-du-Chardonnet on February 18, 1679
  - Marie-Thérèse d'Autriche, Queen of France, pronounced in the Church of the Val-de-Grâce on November 24, 1683
  - Messire Michel Le Tellier, Chancellor of France, pronounced in the church of Les Invalides on March 22, 1686
  - Madame la Dauphine, pronounced in Notre-Dame de Paris on June 15, 1690
  - M. le Duc de Montausier, pronounced in the Carmelites church of faubourg Saint-Jacques, Paris, on August 11, 1690
- Œuvres complètes de Fléchier, classées pour la première fois, selon l'ordre logique et analogique (2 volumes, 1856). Published by Jacques Paul Migne (Paris)
- Mémoires de Fléchier sur les Grands-Jours tenus à Clermont en 1665–1666 was first published in 1844 by Benoît Gonod. The second edition (1856), Mémoires de Fléchier sur les Grands-Jours d'Auvergne en 1665, had a notice by Sainte-Beuve and an appendix by Pierre Adolphe Chéruel. Reedition : Mercure de France, Paris, 1984.

Fléchier left a portrait or caractère of himself, addressed to one of his friends. The "Funeral Oration of Marshal Turenne" has been translated in English in HC Fish's History and Repository of Pulpit Eloquence (ii., 1857).

== Memory ==
There are streets named after Esprit Fléchier in several communes of France, including Éleu-dit-Leauwette, Marseille, Paris and Tarascon.
