= Place Saint-Sulpice =

Square in Paris, France

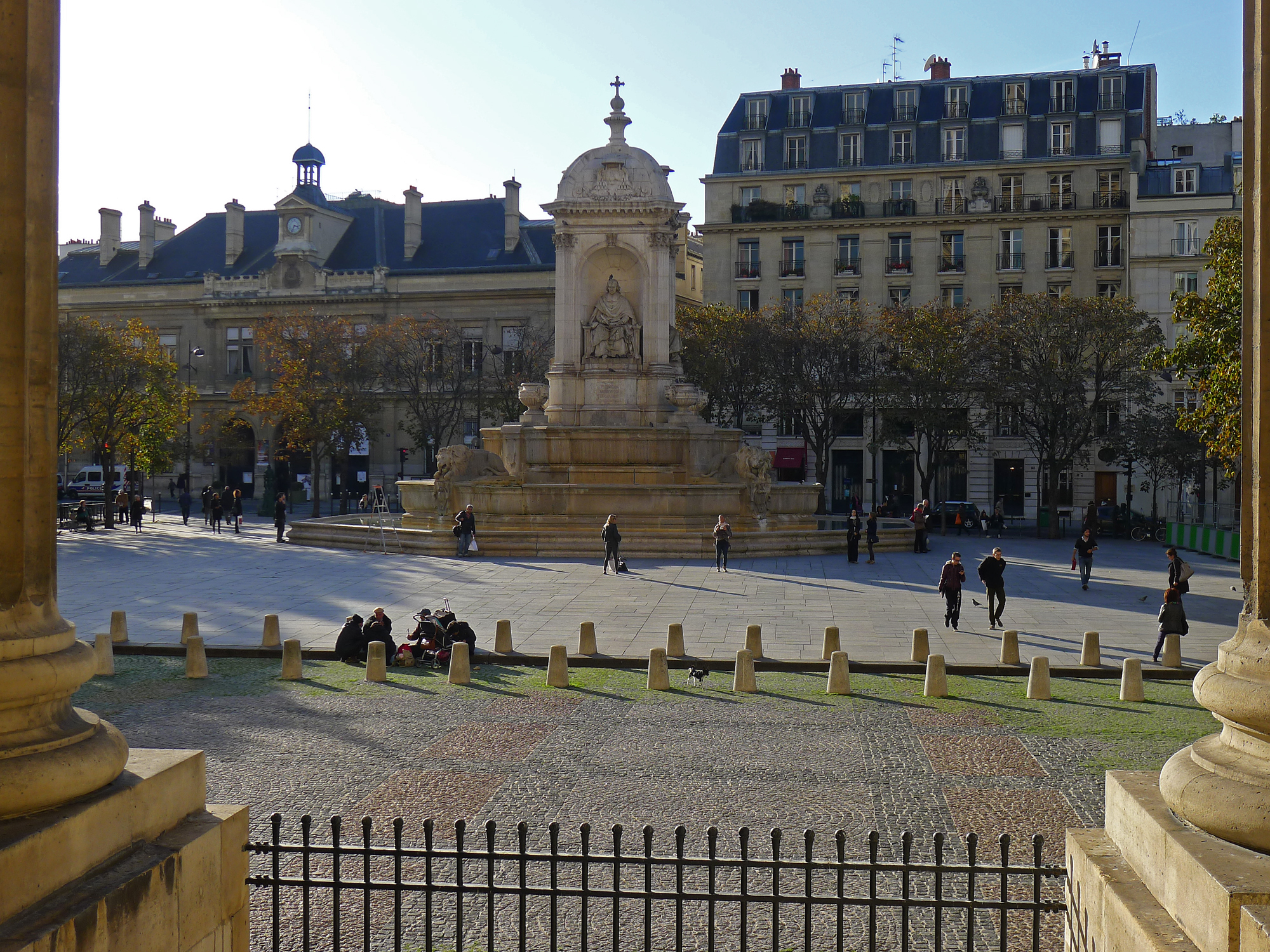
- View of the square and the Fountain of the Four Bishops from the Church of Saint-Sulpice

- Location within Paris
- Length: 60 m (200 ft)
- Width: 60 m (200 ft)
- Arrondissement: 6th
- Quarter: Latin Quarter
- Coordinates: 48°51′3″N 2°20′0″E

Construction
- Completion: 1754
- Denomination: Saint-Sulpice

The Place Saint-Sulpice is a large public square, dominated on its eastern side by the Church of Saint-Sulpice. It was built in 1754 as a tranquil garden in the Latin Quarter of the 6th arrondissement of Paris.

== History as a tourist destination ==
By 1855, the Place was already a tourist destination, with several omnibuses traversing the square, and the Church highlighted. Ticket offices for the omnibuses and trains opened on the Place by 1857. By 1867, a “generally well kept water-closet” opened for people who were waiting to change omnibuses, as well as railroad ticket offices. After the war and insurrection, British and American tourists were directed to see the fountain and flowers sold at the Place.

As of 1894, the square, laid out in 1811 by Napoleon’s decree, was already described as “Old and New Paris” and a flower market had been established. As of 1916, motor buses replaced the old omnibus.

In the 1920s, there was an annual fête in May; stores selling antiques, books, and costumes lined the Place. In his memoir of those days, Ernest Hemingway wrote in A Moveable Feast about the Place and its sites, both fixed like the benches, trees, statues of bishops, and lions, as well as the unfixed, walking pigeons. A café on the square, “Café de la Mairie, served food and drinks” to Lost Generation writers, which included Hemingway, F. Scott Fitzgerald, Djuna Barnes, and Samuel Beckett.

The Café was known in the 1950s and 1960s for its “flair.” Albert Camus read his daily newspaper there in those times. By the turn of the Century, this café was “frequented by literary types,” publishers, and students who all enjoyed the inexpensive coffee and “the lack of so many tourists.”

Several high-end brand shops opened up on the square, including Annick Goutal, Yves St Laurent, and Christian Lacroix. Shopping is available at Saint-Sulpice for “a wealth of great fashion and household delights.”

The big draw for tourists has always been the Church, but “the entire generous space is beloved by Parisians on lush summer evenings and on frigid February nights.” The Christmas Fair and an annual June antiques fair attract both locals and tourists. The fountains, statuary, trees, sculptures, and seminary are also noted in guidebooks, old and new.

In 1975, George Perec famously wrote, “There are many things on the Place Saint-Sulpice.” In a Futurist perspective, “Place Saint-Sulpice 2.0 is a layered place, in part a public place, in part a parochial location.”

== Features ==
In addition to the church, the square features the Fontaine Saint-Sulpice, or Fountain of the Four Bishops (Fontaine des Quatre Evêques), built in the center of the square between 1844 and 1848, which was designed by the architect Joachim Visconti.

The first photographs of the new fountain in 1848 was by the new technology's inventor, Hippolyte Bayard.

The fountain presents the statues of four bishops, all known for their excellent preaching, one on each of its sides:

- Bossuet, North, statue by Jean-Jacques Feuchère
- Fénelon, East, statue by François Lanno
- Fléchier, West, statue by Louis Desprez
- Massillon, South, statue by Jacques-Auguste Fauginet

Some people call this monumental fountain the Fontaine des Quatre Points cardinaux (lit. the "Fountain of the Four Cardinal Points"). This is a bit of innocent wordplay; none of the four esteemed bishops ever became a cardinal.

Other features include chestnut trees, the city hall (French: mairie) of the 6th arrondissement, and the Café de la Mairie, a rendezvous for writers and students, which featured in the 1990 film, La Discrète ("The Discreet"), directed by Christian Vincent, starring Fabrice Luchini and Judith Henry.

Servadoni had planned a coherent square of identical buildings surrounding Saint-Sulpice, but only one, at number 6, was built to his designs; the rest reflect his concepts. His designs of 1754 had already been extensively reworked by the 1820s.

== Metro stations ==
Located near the Metro stations: Mabillon and Saint-Sulpice.

The square is served by lines 4 and 10.

== Gallery ==
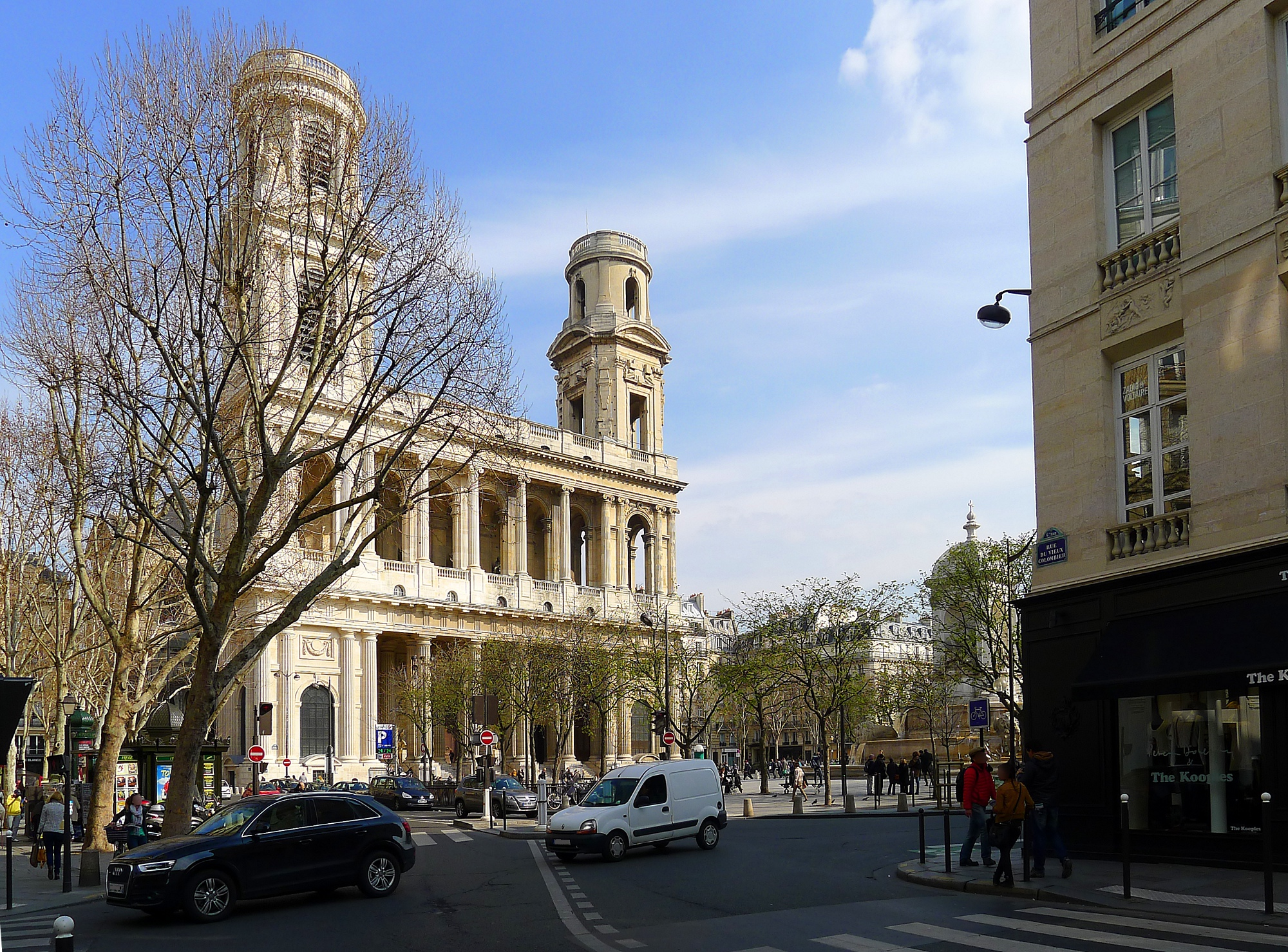
Place Saint-Sulpice and Church of Saint-Sulpice viewed from the Rue du Vieux-Colombier

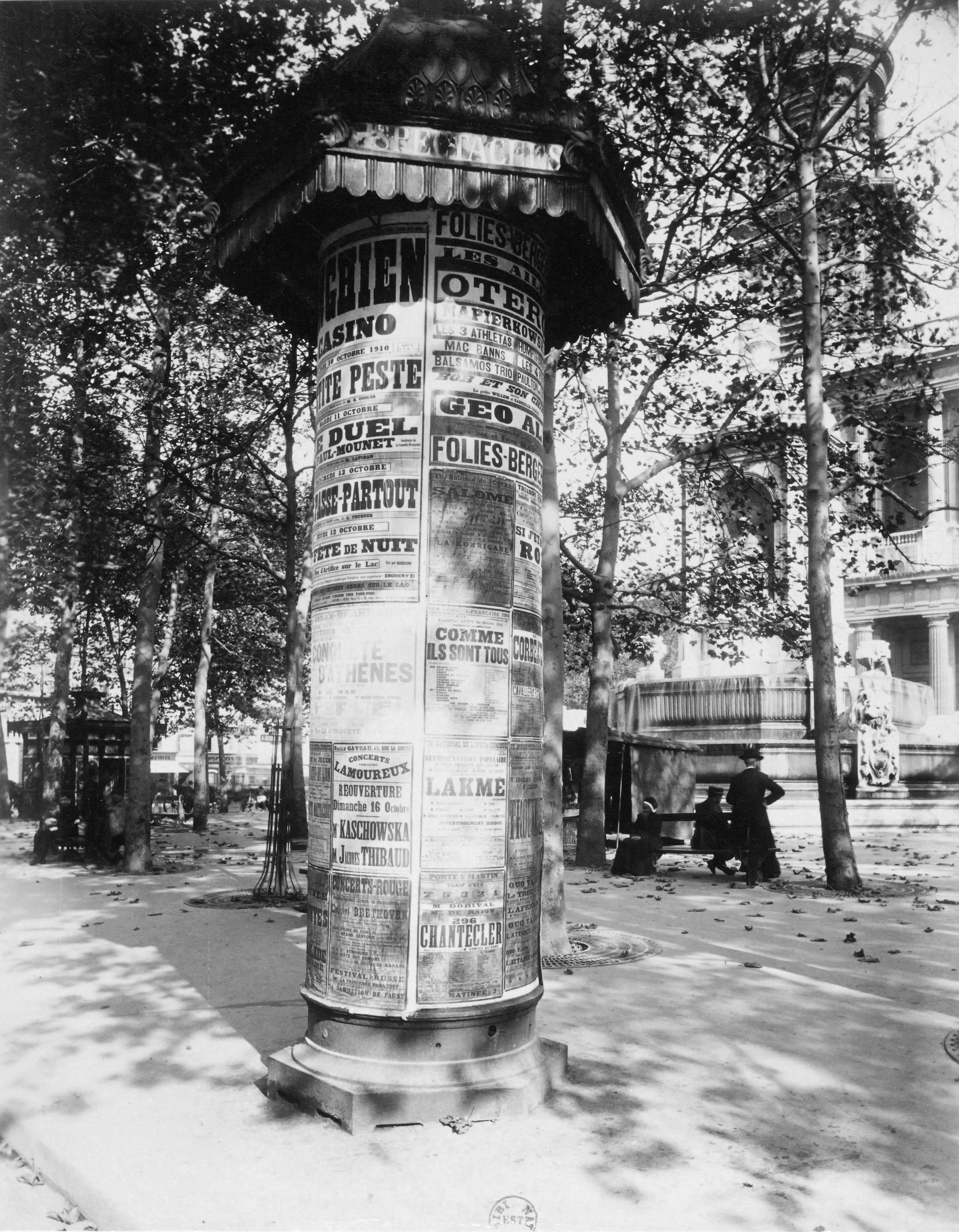
A colonne Morris in the Place Saint-Sulpice, 1911

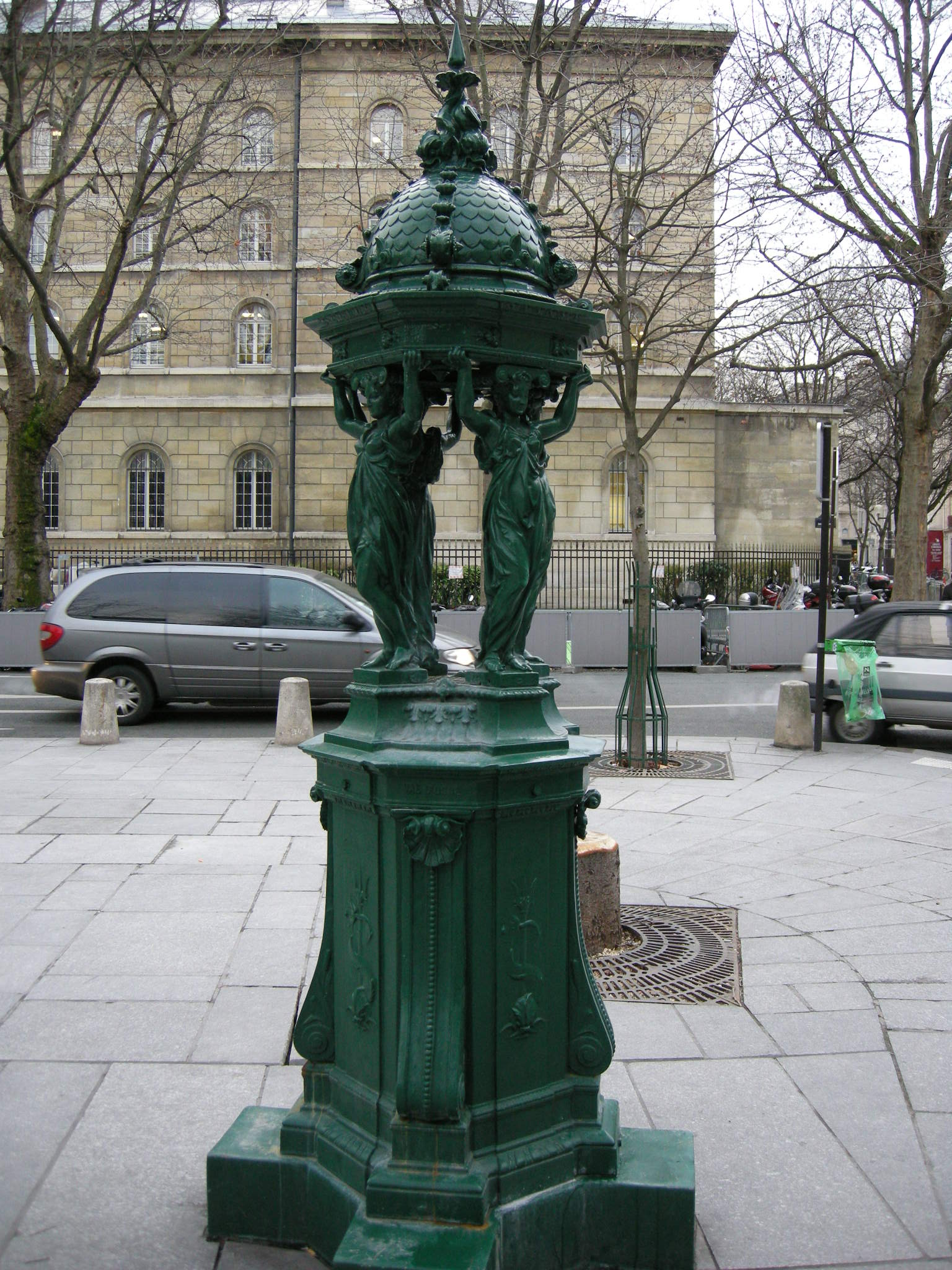
Wallace fountain in the Place Saint-Sulpice

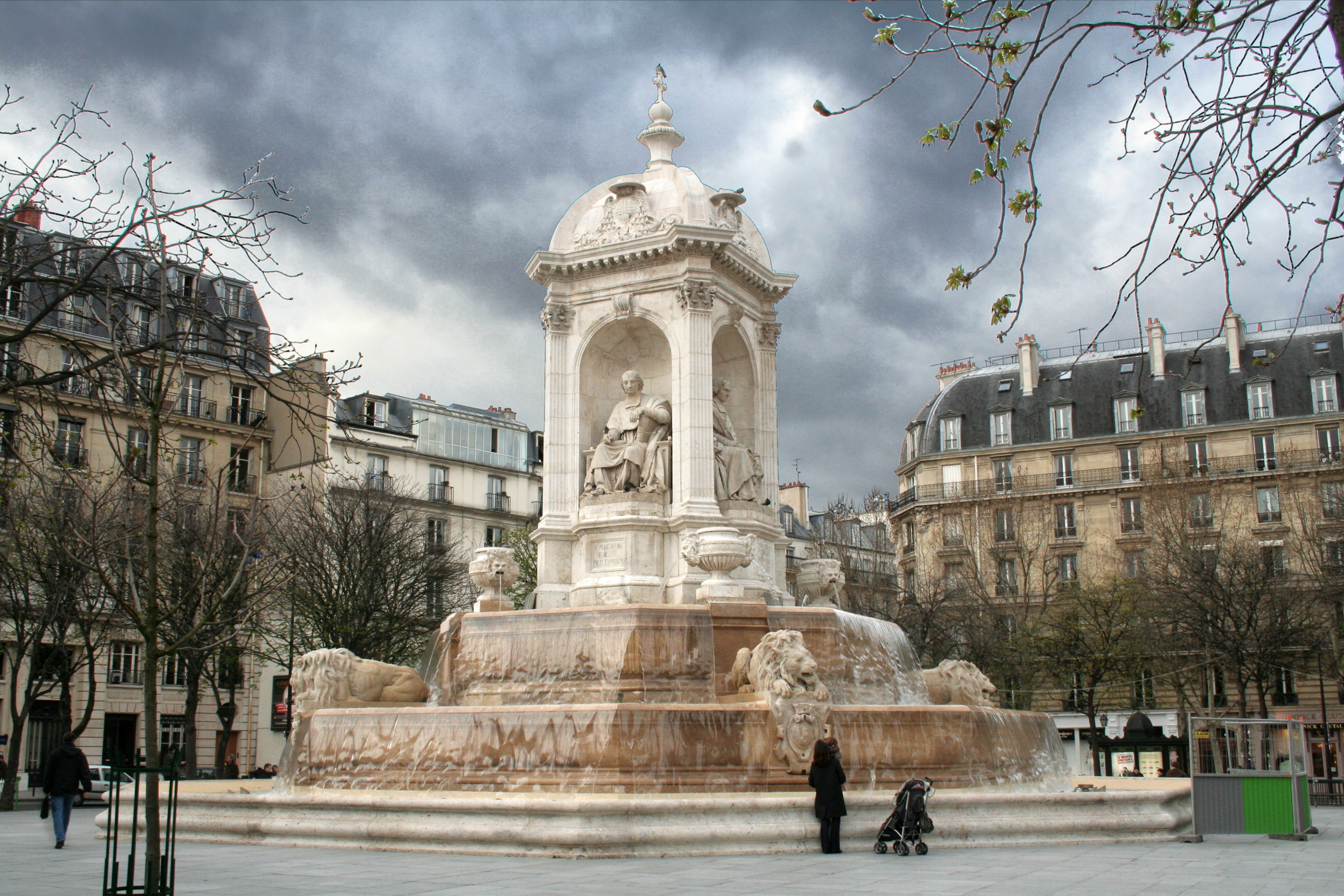
Fontaine Saint-Sulpice
