= Louis Visconti =

Italian-French architect and designer (1791-1853)

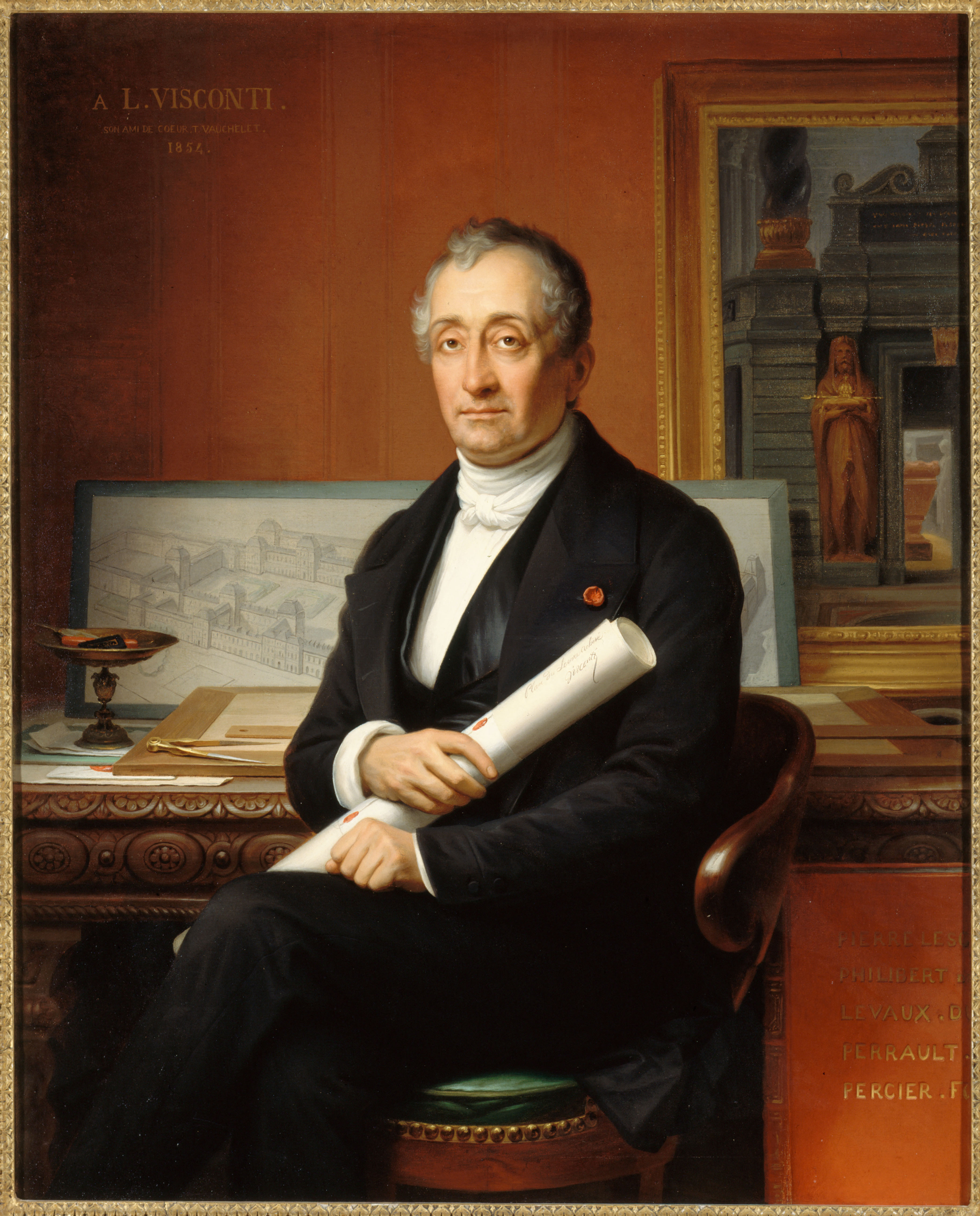
Louis Visconti, portrait by Théophile Vauchelet (1802–1873).

Louis Tullius Joachim Visconti (Rome February 11, 1791 – December 29, 1853) was an Italian-born French architect and designer.

== Life ==
Son of the Italian archaeologist and art historian Ennio Quirino Visconti, Visconti designed many Parisian residences, public buildings and squares, including the Place Saint Sulpice and the overall design of the Fontaine Molière, and was briefly the official architect for the Louvre under Napoleon III. He is probably most famed for designing the 1842 tomb of Napoleon at Les Invalides. His students include Joseph Poelaert, designer of the Palais de justice de Bruxelles.

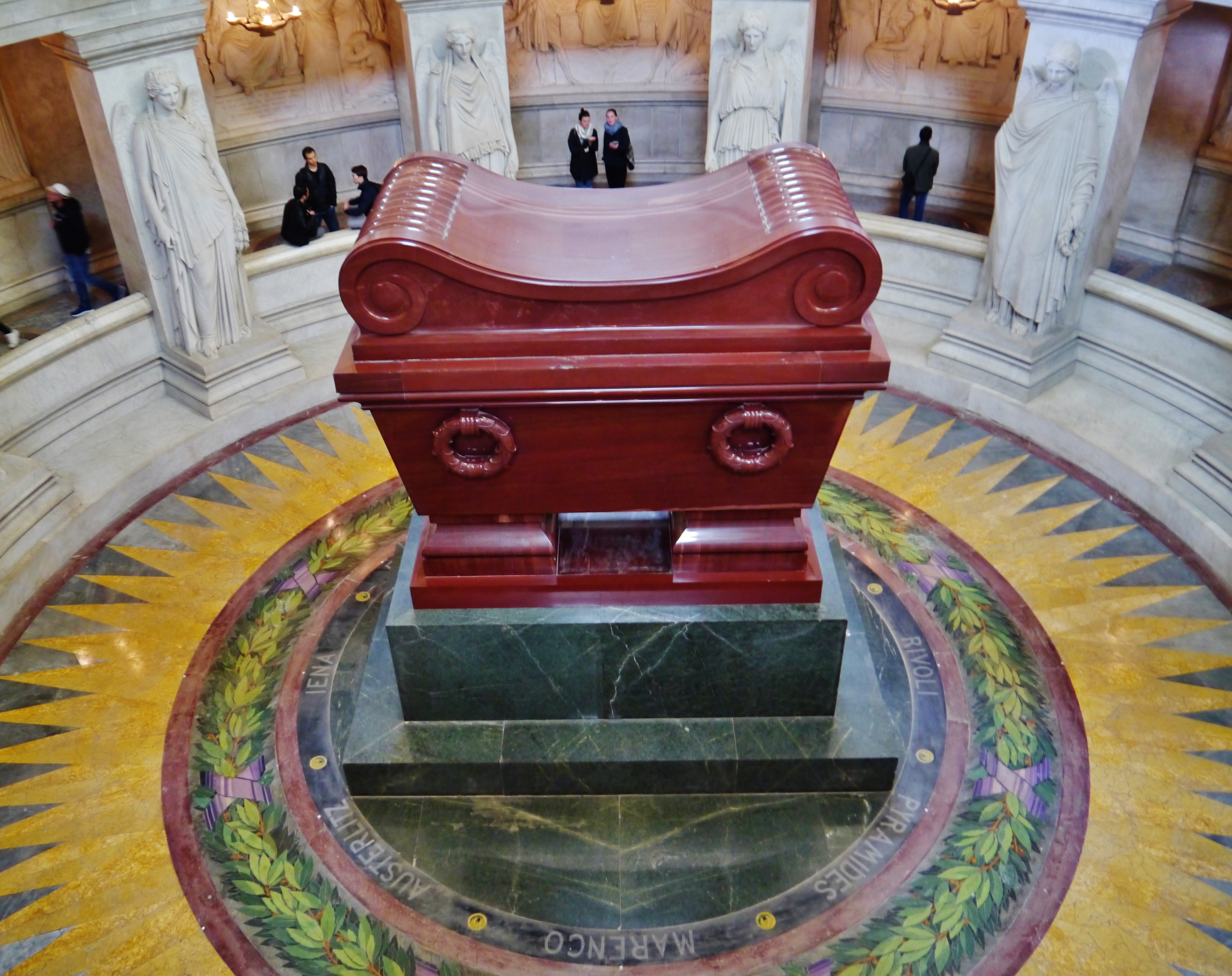
Napoleon's tomb designed by Visconti

Louis Visconti came from a famous family of archaeologists - his grandfather Giambattista Antonio Visconti (1722–1784) had founded the Vatican Museums and his father, Ennio Quirino Visconti (1751–1818), was a curator. Ennio and his family moved to Paris in 1798 and were naturalised as French citizens in 1799, with Ennio becoming a curator of antiquities and paintings at the Musée du Louvre.

Between 1808 and 1817 Louis studied at Paris's École des Beaux-Arts under Charles Percier. He also studied under the painter François-André Vincent. After winning second prize in the architecture section of the prix de Rome (1814) and the architecture department prize at the École des Beaux-Arts (1817), he was made architecte-voyer to the 3rd and 8th arrondissements of Paris in 1826, curator of the 8th section of public monuments in Paris (made up of the Bibliothèque royale, the monument on place des Victoires, Porte Saint-Martin, Saint-Denis and the colonne Vendôme) in 1832, divisional architect in 1848, and government architect in 1849. In the meantime, in 1840, he designed Paris's decorations for the return of Napoleon's remains and Napoleon's tomb at the Invalides.

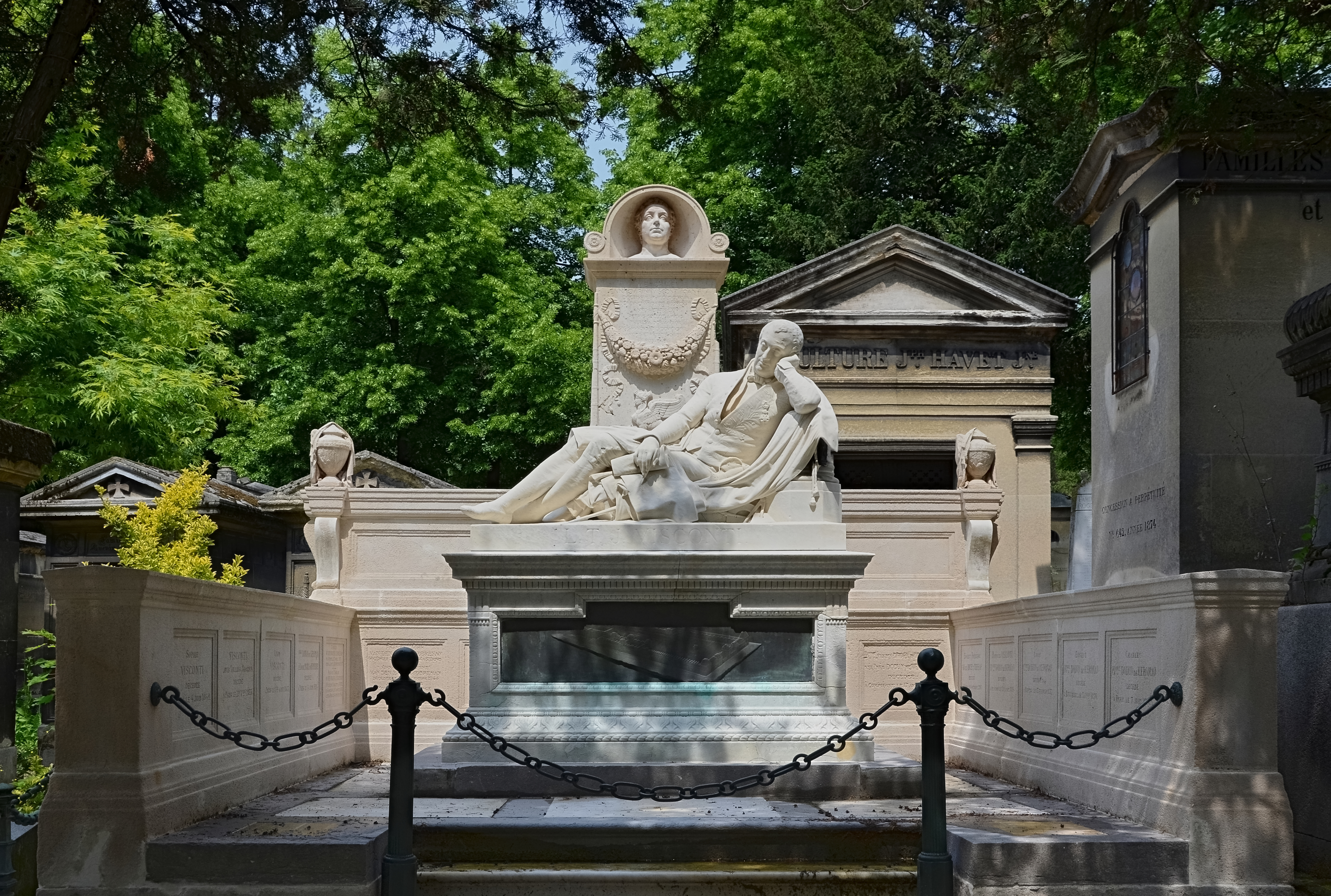
The grave of Louis Visconti in Père Lachaise Cemetery in Paris

Collaborating with Émile Trélat in the works to rebuild the Bibliothèque royale du Louvre in May 1848, he produced a first-draft design for completing the Palais du Louvre. He was made architect to the palais des Tuileries on 7 July 1852 and architect to Napoléon III on 16 February 1853, and was put in charge of connecting the Palais du Louvre and the Palais des Tuileries, a project known as Nouveau Louvre and only completed later by Hector-Martin Lefuel. He was also made president of the Société Centrale des Architectes in 1852. Visconti died of a heart attack in 1853, the year of his election to the Académie des Beaux-Arts. He is buried in Pere Lachaise Cemetery in Paris with a full size reclining figure of himself on the tomb.

== Major works ==
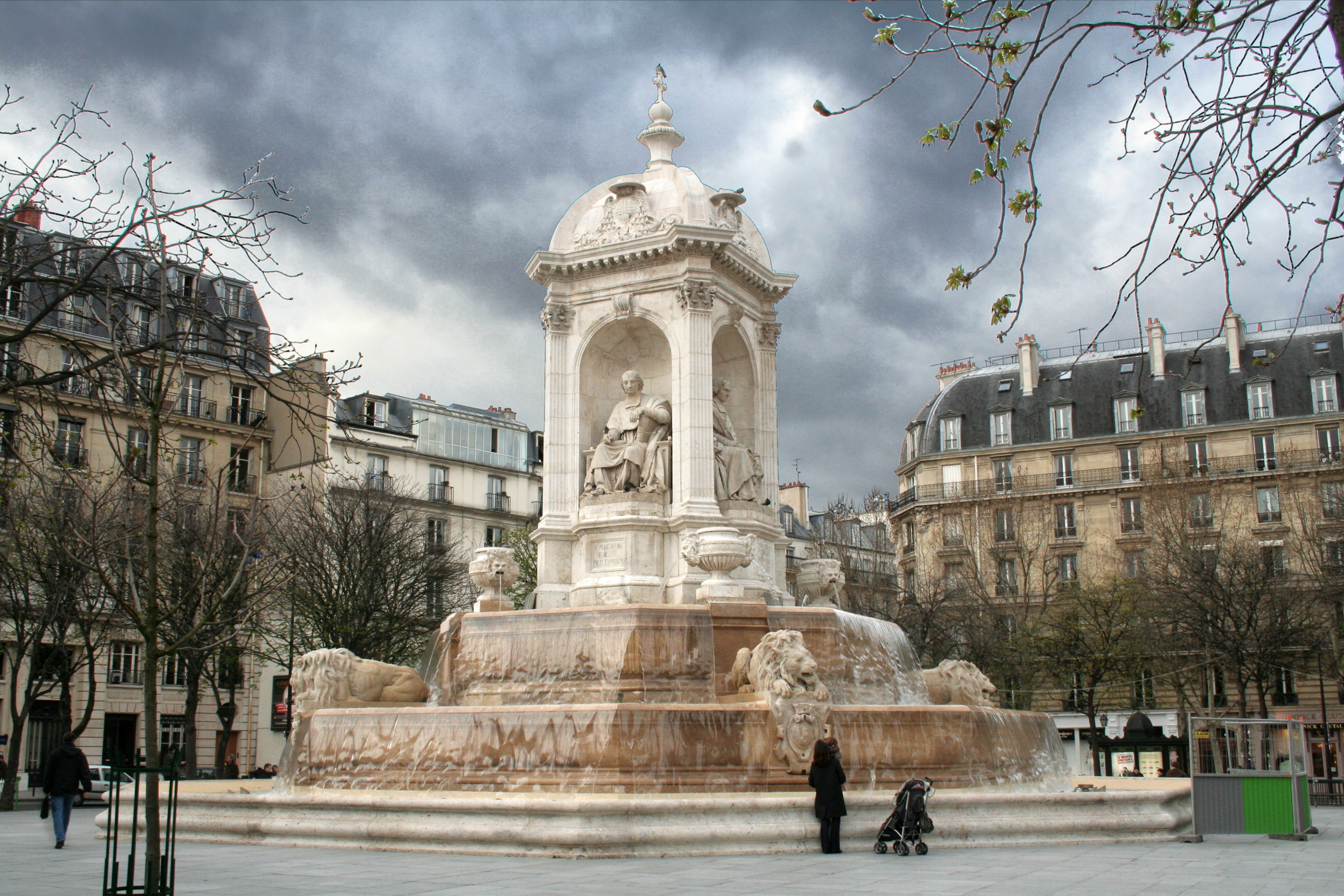
Fontaine Saint-Sulpice in Paris

- Hôtel de Gouvion Saint-Cyr, also known as Mle Mars, 1 rue de la Tour-des-Dames, 1821.
- Aménagements de l'hôtel de Charost, 39 rue du Faubourg-Saint-Honoré, 1825.
- Fontaine Gaillon, place Gaillon, Paris, 1824-1828.
- Agrandissement du Palais du Luxembourg, 1834.
- Immeuble Farine, 104 rue de Richelieu, 1834.
- Château du Grand-Bury, 1834.
- Fontaine Louvois, Paris, 1835-1839.
- Hôtel de Pontalba, 41 rue du Faubourg-Saint-Honoré, 1839.
- Hôtel Collot, 25 quai Anatole-France, Paris, 1840, neoclassical style
- Hôtel Visconti, 3 rue Fortin, 1840.
- Fontaine Molière, 37 rue de Richelieu, Paris, 1841-1843.
- Fontaine de la place Saint-Sulpice, Paris, 1842-1848.
- Hôtel de La Tour du Pin, 25 rue Barbet-de-Jouy, 1844.
- Château de Lissy, Seine-et-Marne, 1844.
- Hôtel Rigaud, 10 rue Mogador, 1845.
- Agrandissement du ministère de l'Intérieur, rue de Grenelle, with Moreau, 1846.
- Extension du ministère des Finances, 1846.
- Hôtel de La Vaupalière, rue du Faubourg Saint-Honoré, rebuilding (undated).

== Sources ==
- A Dictionary of Architecture and Building, Biographical, Historical, and Descriptive, Russell Sturgis editor, 1901
- (in French) Françoise Hamon and Charles MacCallum, Louis Visconti. 1791-1853, Paris, Délégation à l'Action Artistique de la Ville de Paris, 1991 – ISBN 2-905118-38-5
