= Jean-Louis Jaley =

French sculptor (1802–1866)

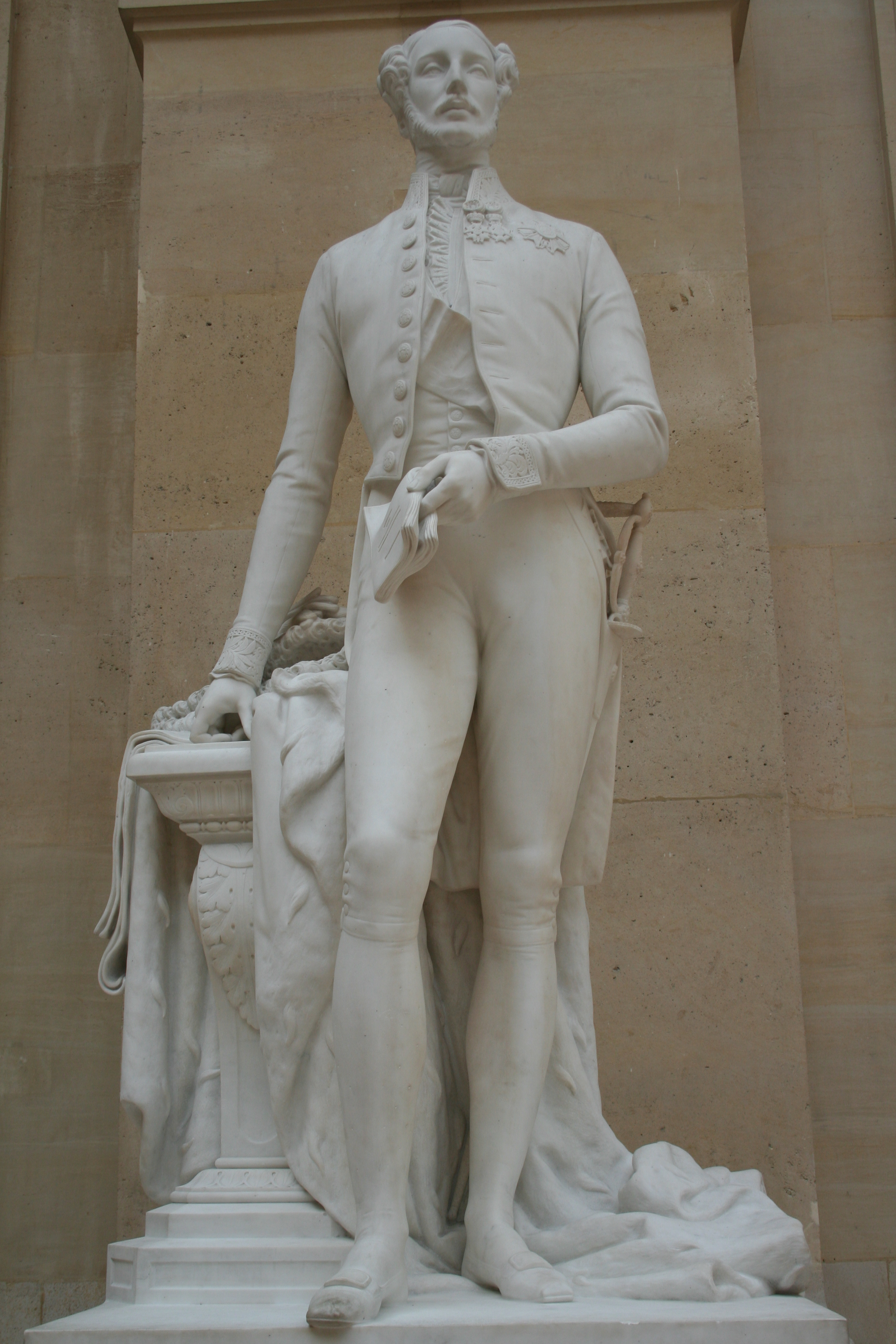
Portrait du duc d'Orléans

Jean-Louis Nicolas Jaley (27 January 1802, Paris – 30 May 1866, Neuilly-sur-Seine) was a French sculptor.

He was the pupil of his father Louis Jaley and Pierre Cartellier. In 1827, he won - together with François Lanno - the Prix de Rome for sculpture with a bas-relief Mucius Scævola devant Porsenna.

He was buried in the Père Lachaise Cemetery (49th division), near his father, who died in 1840.

== Works ==
- La Prière (The Prayer), statue, marble, 1831, Paris, musée du Louvre
- La Pudeur (The Modesty), statue, marble, 1833, Paris, musée du Louvre
- Portrait du duc d'Orléans, statue, marble, 1842–1844, Paris, musée du Louvre
- allegorical figures of Vienna and London, Gare du Nord, Paris, circa 1864

== Sources ==
- Emmanuel Schwartz, Les Sculptures de l'École des Beaux-Arts de Paris. Histoire, doctrines, catalogue, École nationale supérieure des Beaux-Arts, Paris, 2003
- Domenico Gabrielli, Dictionnaire Historique du cimetière du Père-Lachaise XVIIIème et XIXème siècles, L'Amateur editions, 2002
