= Fontaine Louvois =

Fountain in Paris, France

Coordinates: 48°52′4.70″N 2°20′15.28″E

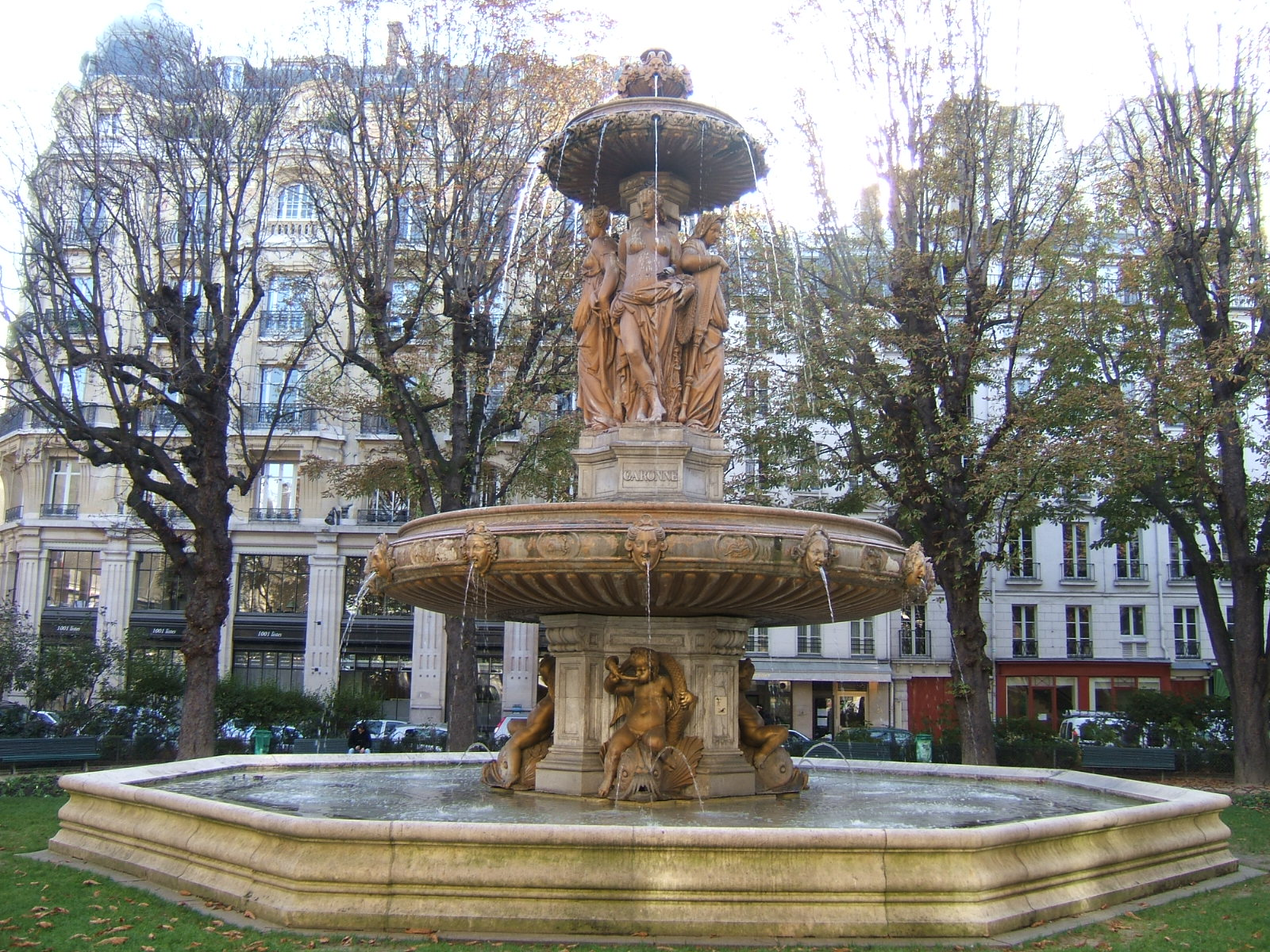
- Artist: Louis Visconti (designer), Jean-Baptiste-Jules Klagmann (sculptor)
- Completion date: 1836 to 1839; 186 years ago
- Subject: hommage to four great rivers of France: the Seine, the Garonne, the Loire, and the Saône
- Location: Paris, France

The Fontaine Louvois is a monumental public fountain in Square Louvois on the rue Richelieu in the Second Arrondissement of Paris, near the entrance of the Bibliothèque nationale de France. It was built between 1836 and 1839 during the reign of King Louis-Philippe.

Square Louvois was created in 1830, on the site of the former Théâtre National de la rue de la Loi which had been built in 1792 and demolished in 1820. The fountain was designed by Louis Visconti, and the sculpture is by Jean-Baptiste-Jules Klagmann. It was restored in 1859, 1874, and 1974. It also features in Episode 1 Season 4 of Gossip Girl. It is the fountain that Serena (Blake Lively) is pushed into by Blair (Leighton Meester).

The fountain was intended as an hommage to four great rivers of France: the Seine, the Garonne, the Loire, and the Saône, represented by four statues of women who support the upper basin. The base of the statue is decorated with four tritons mounted on dolphins. Around the rim of the large marble basin of the fountain are twelve carved signs of the zodiac, alternating with mascarons, the spouts which pour water.

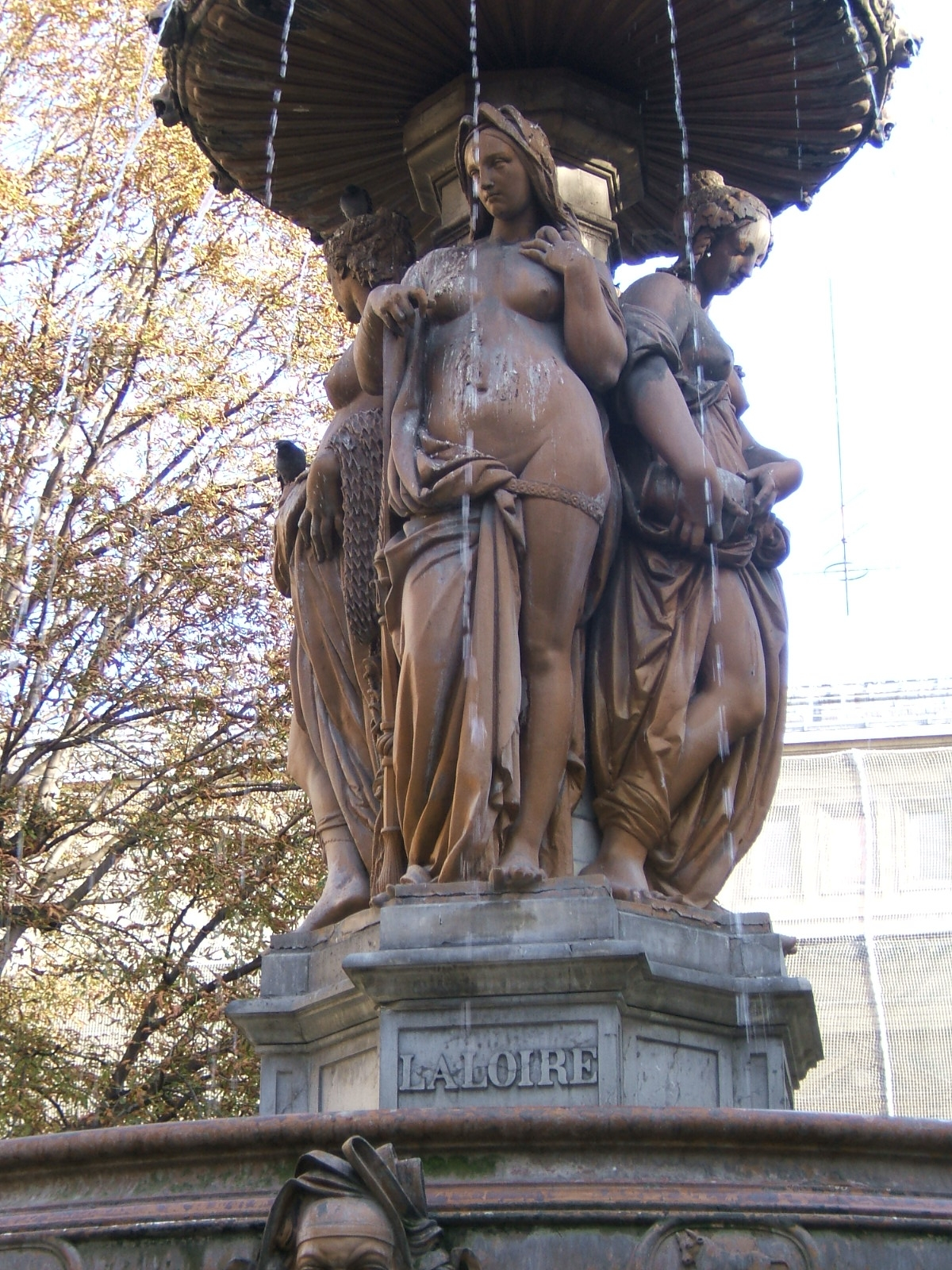
Statue of the Loire

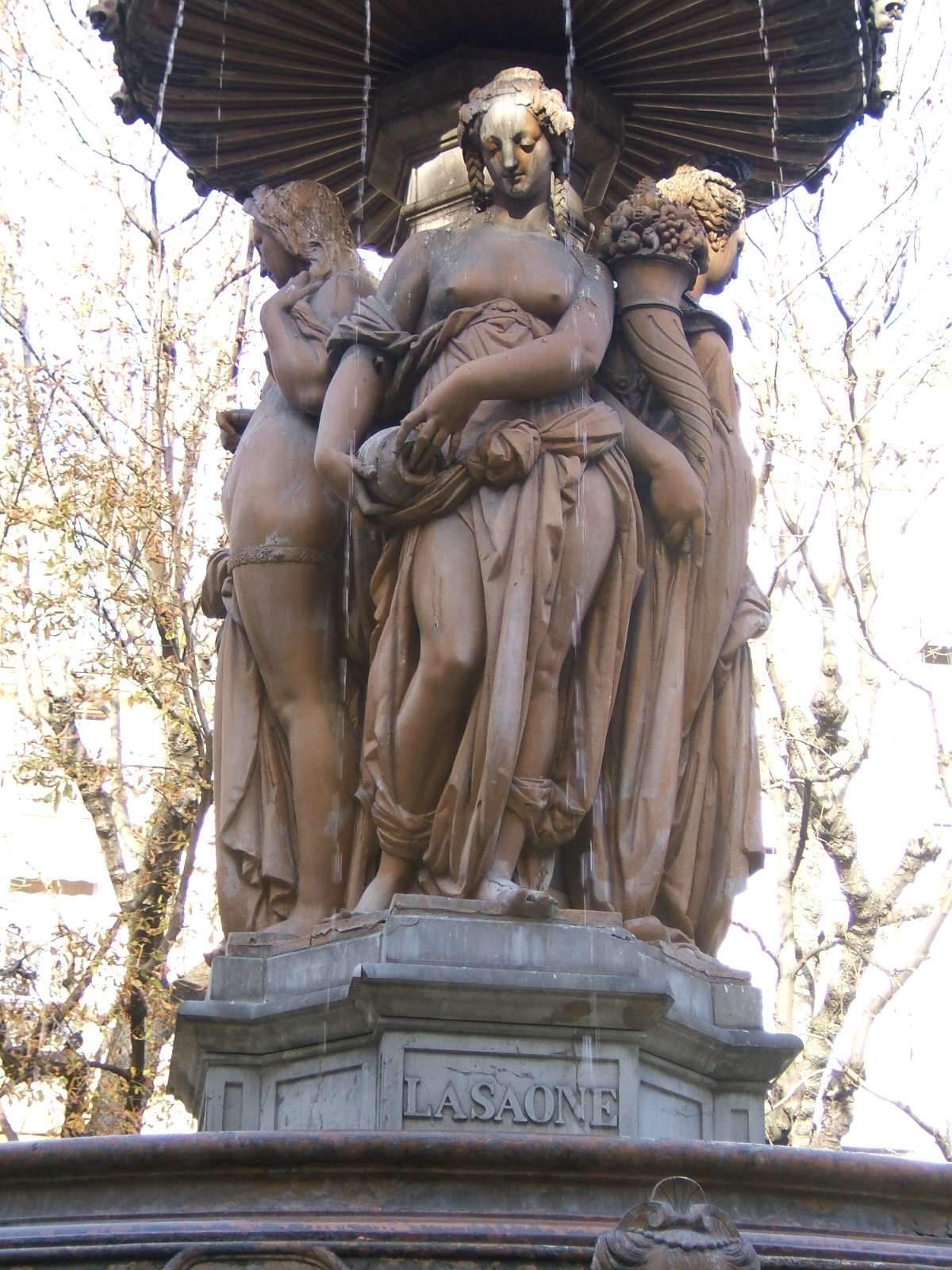
Statue of the Saône

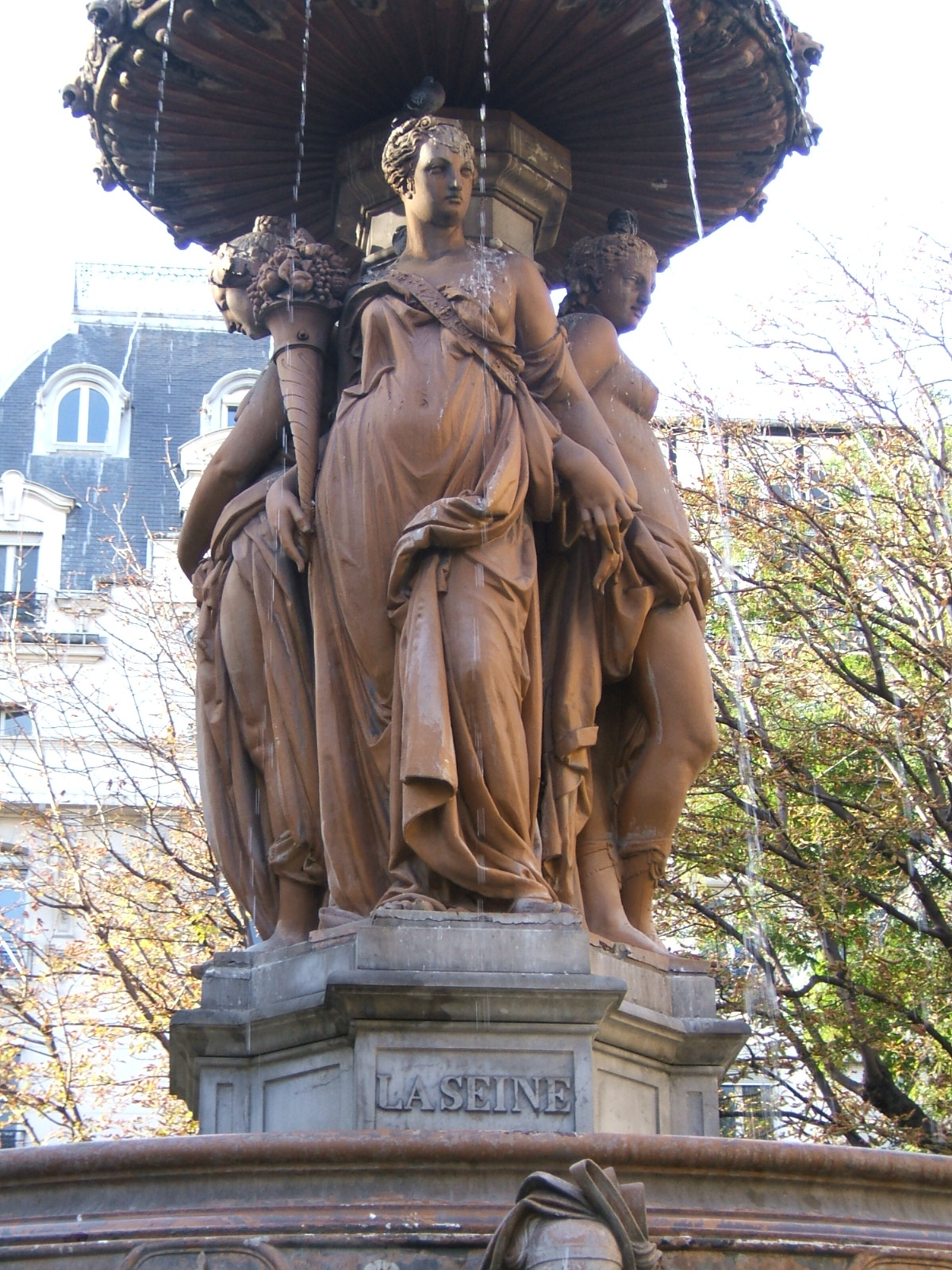
Statue of the Seine

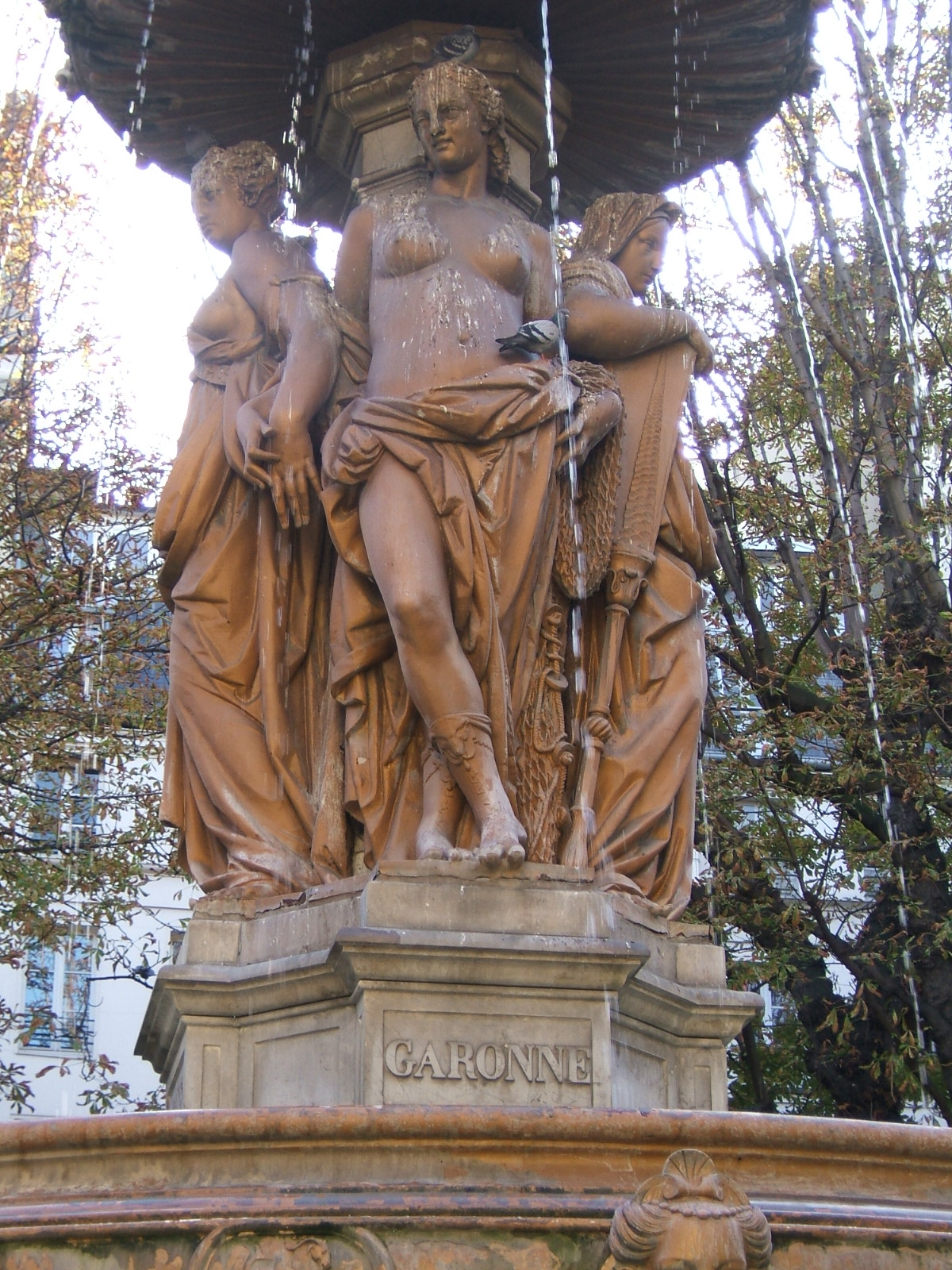
Statue of the Garonne

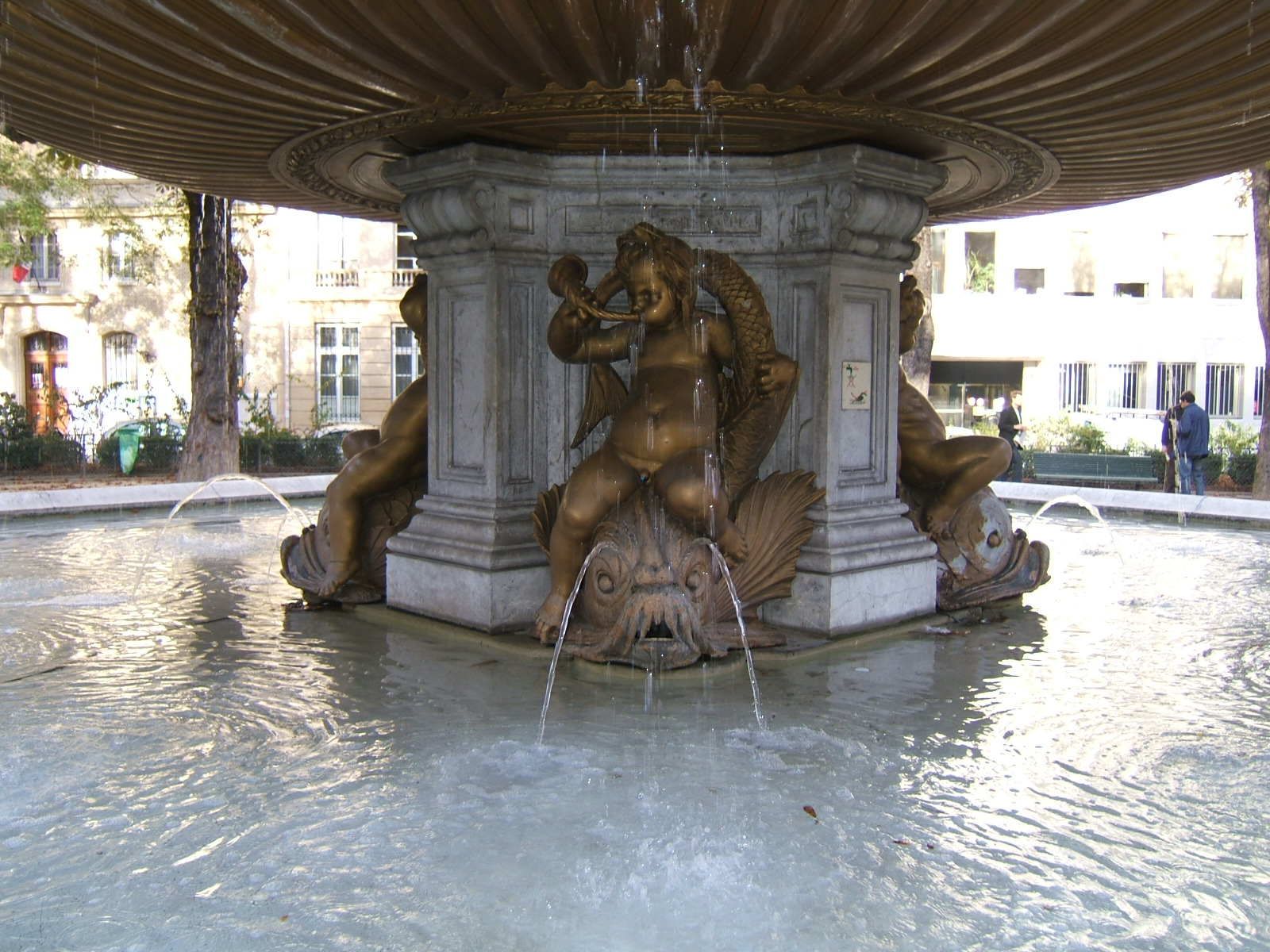
One of the four tritons riding a dolphin

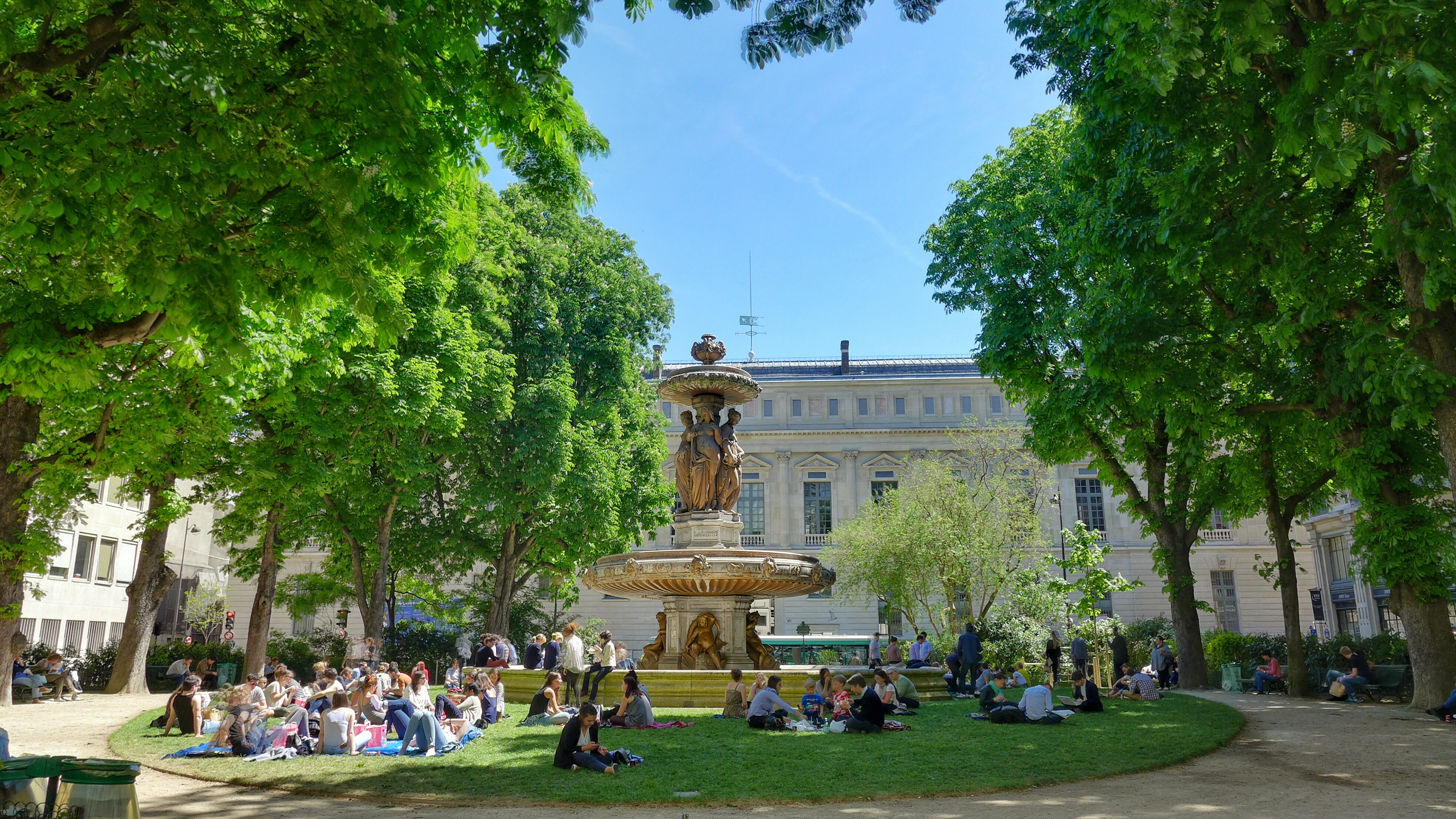
Fontaine Louvois in the middle of Square Louvois in the end of May, seen from the West entrance on Lulli street

== Bibliography ==
- 'Paris et ses fontaines, de la Renaissance à nos jours, Collection Paris et son patrimoine, organized by Béatrice de Andia, Délégué Général à l'Action artistique de la Ville de Paris. (a collection of articles on the history of Paris fountains, organized by the office of the Mayor of the City of Paris.)
