= François Lanno =

French artist

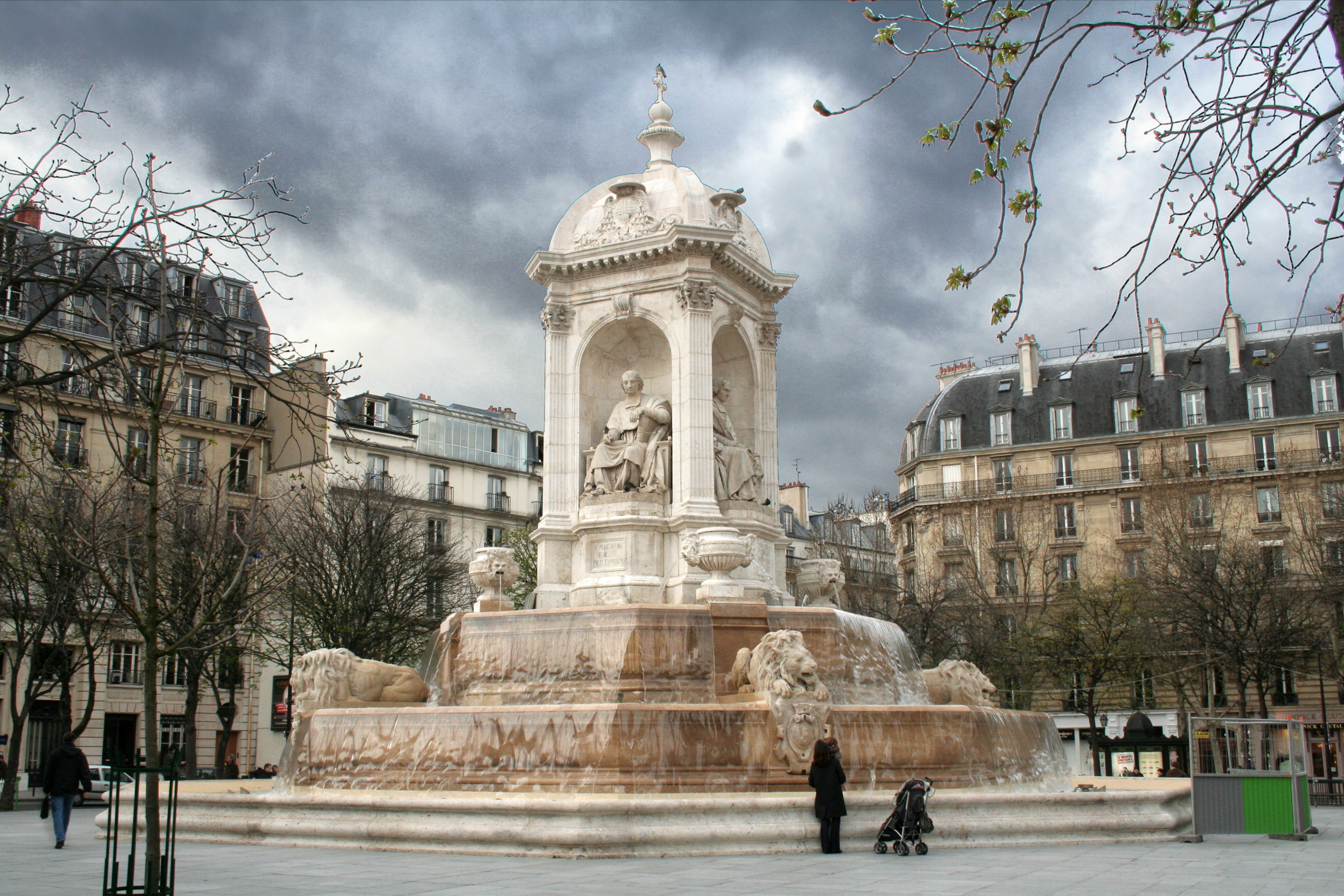
Fountain at Place Saint-Sulpice, Paris

François Gaspard Aimé Lanno (1800 in Rennes – 1871 in Beaumont-du-Gâtinais) was a French sculptor. He was a pupil of François-Frédéric Lemot and Pierre Cartellier. In 1827, he won jointly with Jean-Louis Jaley the Prix de Rome for sculpture with a bas-relief Mucius Scævola devant Porsenna.

== Works ==
- Camille rompant le traité avec Brennus, 1827, bas-relief, plaster, École des Beaux Arts, Paris
- Mucius Scævola devant Porsenna, 1827, bas-relief, plaster, École des Beaux Arts, Paris
- Joven Mercurio, 1829, marble, École des Beaux Arts, Paris
- François Fénelon, one of the figures at the Fountain of the Four Bishops, stone, Place Saint-Sulpice, Paris
- La Récolte des fruits, statue, bronze, fountain on the Place de la Concorde, Paris
- Portrait de Nicolas Poussin, Portrait de Eustache Le Sueur, medallions, Paris, École nationale supérieure des Beaux-Arts, facade of the Palais des Études
- Portrait de Guillaume Gouffier, bust, plaster, Palace of Versailles, Versailles
- Apollon et les neuf Muses, 1835, ten statues, theater, Rennes
- Blaise Pascal, statue, stone, Cour Napoléon, Louvre, Paris
- Esprit Fléchier, statue, stone, also at the Louvre

== Bibliography ==
- Pierre Kjellberg, Le Nouveau guide des statues de Paris, La Bibliothèque des Arts, Paris, 1988
- Emmanuel Schwartz, Les Sculptures de l'École des Beaux-Arts de Paris. Histoire, doctrines, catalogue, École nationale supérieure des Beaux-Arts, Paris, 2003
