= Jean Baptiste Massillon =

French Catholic prelate and preacher

Jean Baptiste Massillon C.O.I.
- Bishop of Clermont
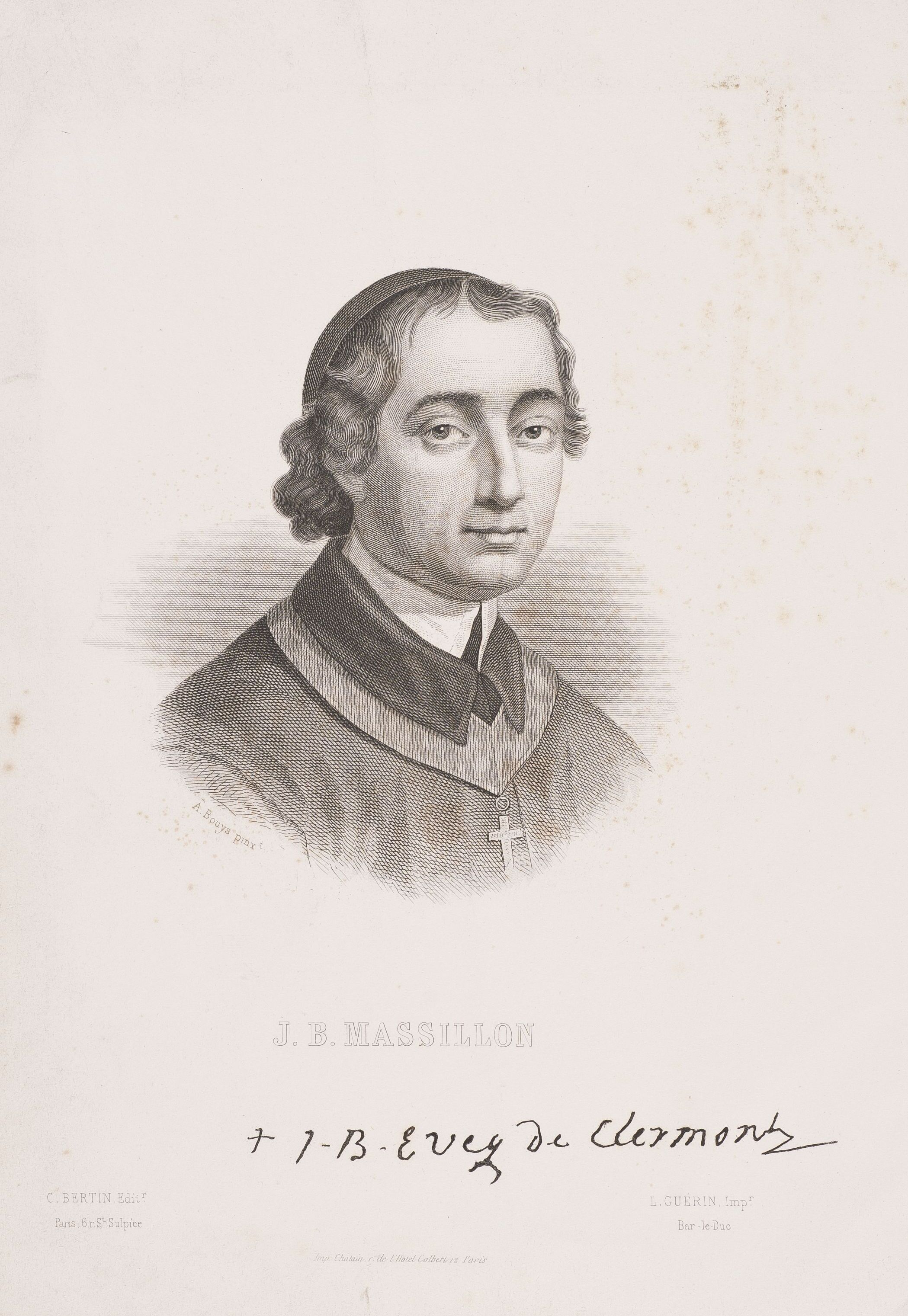
- Church: Catholic Church
- Diocese: Diocese of Clermont
- In office: 14 November 1718 – 28 September 1742
- Predecessor: François Bochart de Saron
- Successor: François-Marie Le Maistre de La Garlaye

Orders
- Ordination: 22 September 1691
- Consecration: 21 December 1718 by André-Hercule de Fleury

Personal details
- Born: 24 June 1663 Hyères, Provence, Kingdom of France
- Died: 28 September 1742 (aged 79) Beauregard-l'Évêque, Auvergne, Kingdom of France

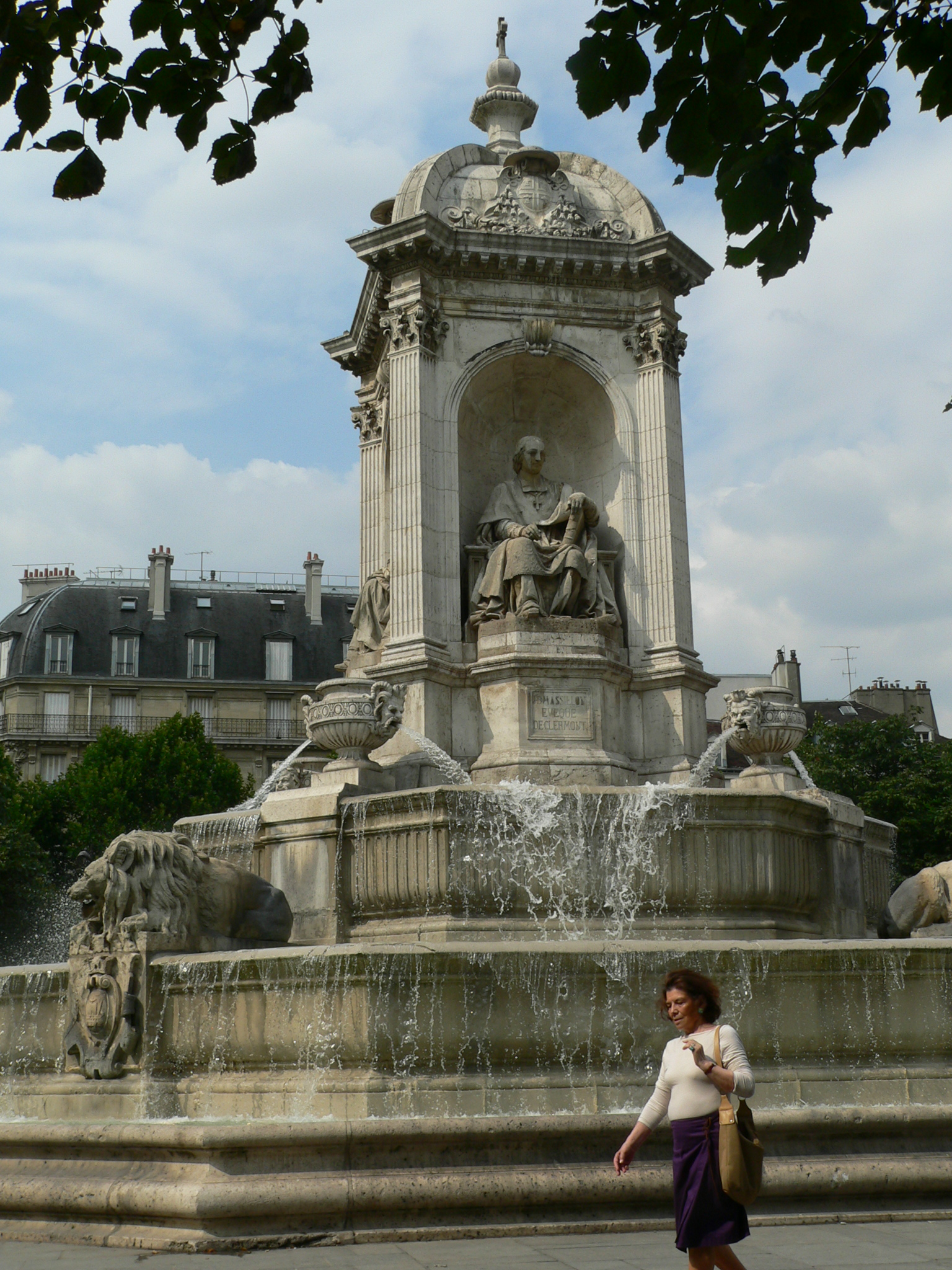
Statue of JB Massillon on the Fountain of the Four Bishops, Place Saint-Sulpice, Paris

Jean-Baptiste Massillon, CO (24 June 1663 – 28 September 1742), was a French Catholic prelate and famous preacher who served as Bishop of Clermont from 1717 until his death in Beauregard-l'Évêque.

== Biography ==
=== Early years ===
Massillon was born at Hyères in Provence where his father was a royal notary. At the age of eighteen he joined the French Oratory and taught for a time in the colleges of his congregation at Pézenas, and Montbrison and at the Seminary of Vienne. On the death of Henri de Villars, Archbishop of Vienne, in 1693, he was commissioned to deliver a funeral oration, and this was the beginning of his fame. In obedience to Cardinal de Noailles, Archbishop of Paris, he left the Trappist Abbey of Sept-Fons, to which he had retired, and settled in Paris, where he was placed at the head of the Oratorian Seminary of Saint Magloire.

=== Career ===
Massillon soon gained a wide reputation as a preacher and was selected to be the Advent preacher at the court of Versailles in 1699. He was made Bishop of Clermont in 1717, and two years later was elected a member of the Académie française. The last years of his life were spent in the faithful discharge of his episcopal duties; his death took place at Clermont on 18 September 1742. Massillon enjoyed in the 18th century a reputation equal to that of Jacques-Bénigne Bossuet and of Louis Bourdaloue, and was much praised for his eloquence by Voltaire, D'Alembert and kindred spirits among the Encyclopaedists.

Massillon's popularity was probably because in his sermons he lays little stress on dogmatic questions, but treats generally of moral subjects, in which the secrets of the human heart and the processes of man's reason are described with poetical feeling. He has usually been contrasted with his predecessor Bourdaloue, the latter having the credit of vigorous denunciation, Massillon that of gentle persuasiveness. Besides the Petit Carême, a sermon which he delivered before the young King Louis XV in 1718, his sermons on the Prodigal Son, on the small number of the elect, on death, for Christmas Day, and for the Fourth Sunday in Advent, may be perhaps cited as his masterpieces. His funeral oration on King Louis XIV is only noted now for the opening sentence: "Dieu seul est grand." (Only God is great.) But, in truth, Massillon is singularly free from inequality. His great literary power, his reputation for benevolence, and his known toleration and dislike of doctrinal disputes caused him to be much more favourably regarded than most churchmen by the philosophers of the 18th century.

The first edition of Massillon's complete works was published by his nephew, also an Oratorian (Paris, 1745–1748), and upon this, in the absence of manuscripts, succeeding reprints were based. The best modern edition is that of the Abbé Blampignon (Paris, 1865–1868, 4 vols.; new ed. 1886).

== Works ==
- 'Sermons from Bishop Jean-Baptist Massillon'.
- 'Massillon's Sermons for All the Sundays'.
- Sentimens d'une Âme touchée de Dieu, tirés des Pseaumes de David; ou, Paraphrase Morale (Frères Estiennes et J. Th. Herissant, Paris 1770 edition) (Google). Psalms I-XXXI.
- Massillon, Jean-Baptiste (1879). Sermons by John-Baptist Massillon . Thomas Tegg & Sons.
