= Louis Desprez =

French sculptor

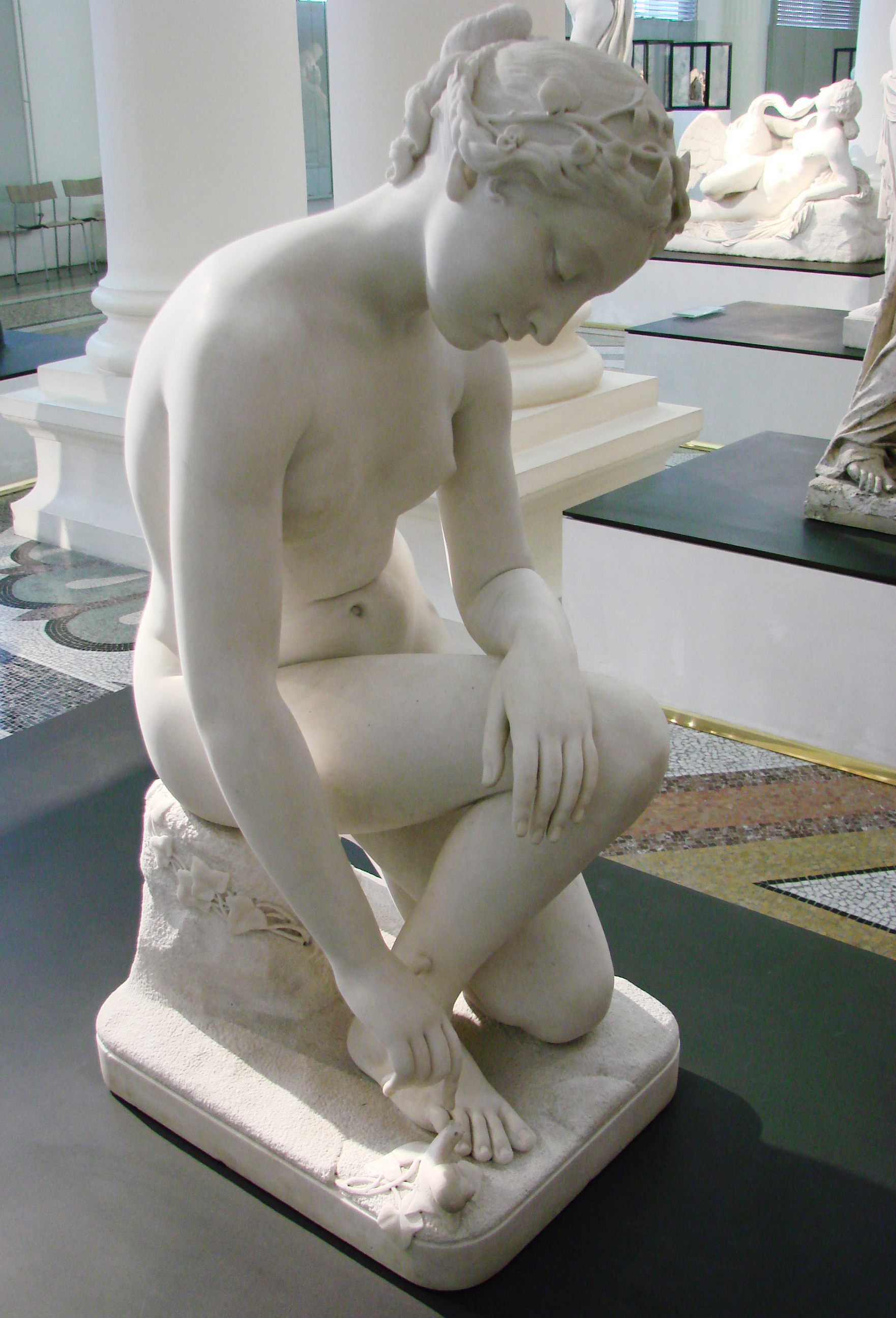
L'Ingénue ou la jeune fille au limaçon, 1843, by Louis Desprez. Musée de Picardie, Amiens

Louis Desprez (1799–1870) was a French sculptor.

Born in Paris, he was a pupil of Francois Joseph Bosio. He went to Rome after winning the Prix de Rome for Sculpture in 1826. He was principally distinguished for his busts and portrait statues.

== See also ==
- Caserne des Petits-Pères
