= Quartier des Invalides =

Coordinates: 48.8570374°N 2.3118779°E

Invalides
- Quartier des Invalides
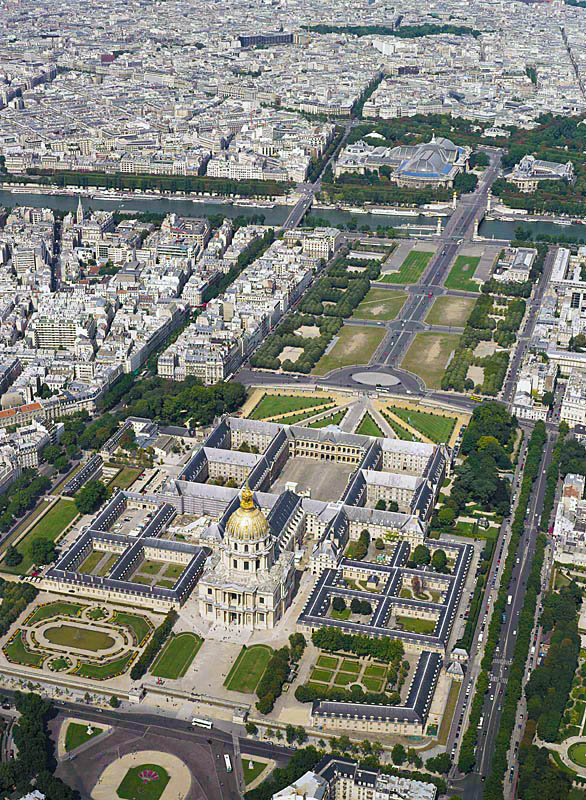
- Les Invalides
- Interactive map of Invalides
- Country: France
- Region: Île-de-France
- Ville: Paris
- Arrondissement: 7th

Area
  - Total: 1.074 km^{2} (0.415 sq mi)

Population (2016)
  - Total: 5,538
  - Density: 5,138/km^{2} (13,310/sq mi)

The Quartier des Invalides is the 26th administrative district of Paris, located in the 7th arrondissement.

In addition to the Hôtel des Invalides, it houses the Palais Bourbon—the seat of the National Assembly—as well as a significant number of government ministries (which are also found in the neighboring Quartier de Saint-Thomas-d'Aquin), including those for Labour, Agriculture, the Armed Forces, Foreign Affairs, National Education, and the Civil Service, among others. The town hall (mairie) of the 7th arrondissement is also located here.

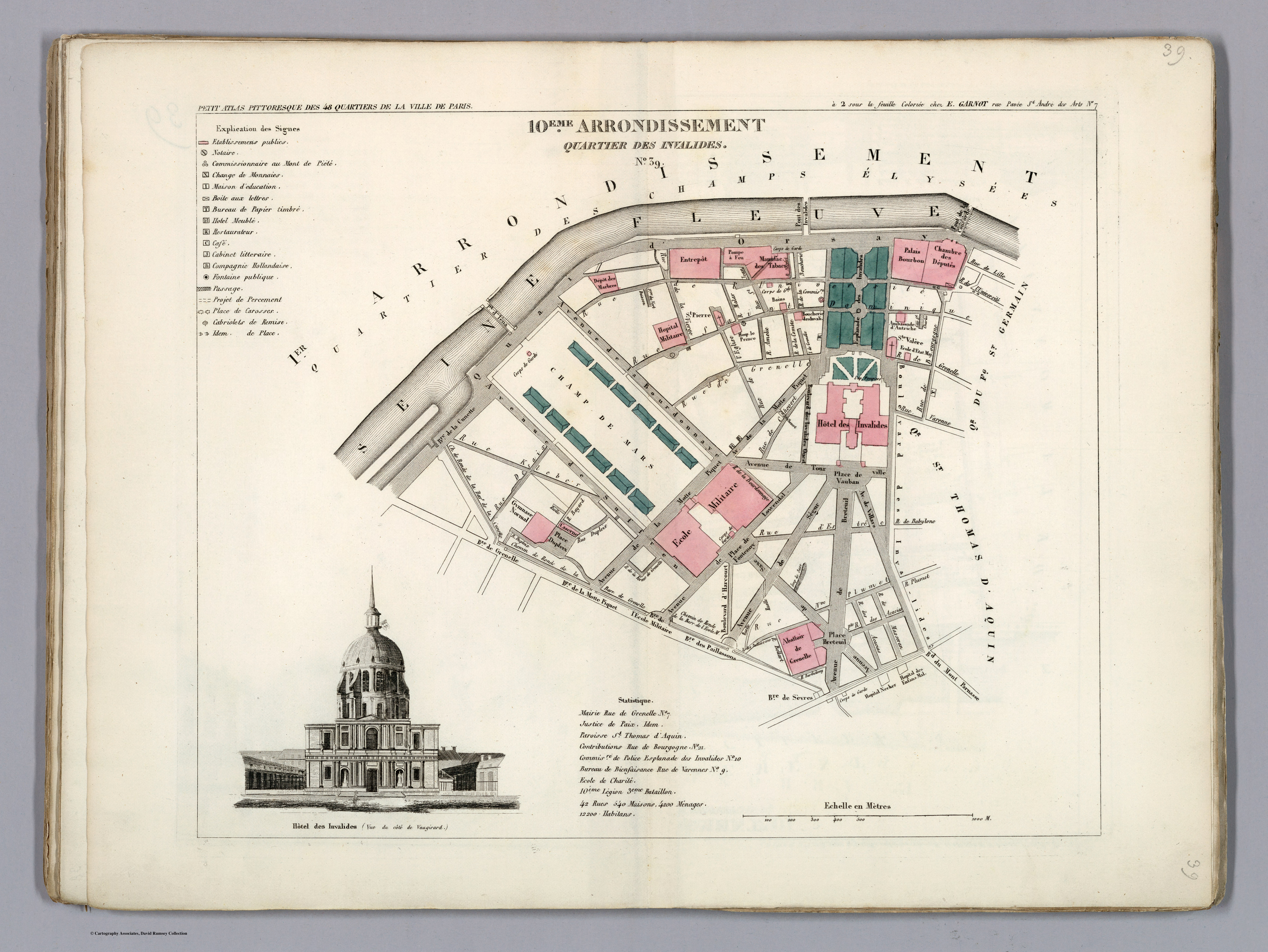
Map of the Invalides neighborhood in the former 10th arrondissement in 1834.

Quarters of the 7th arrondissement.
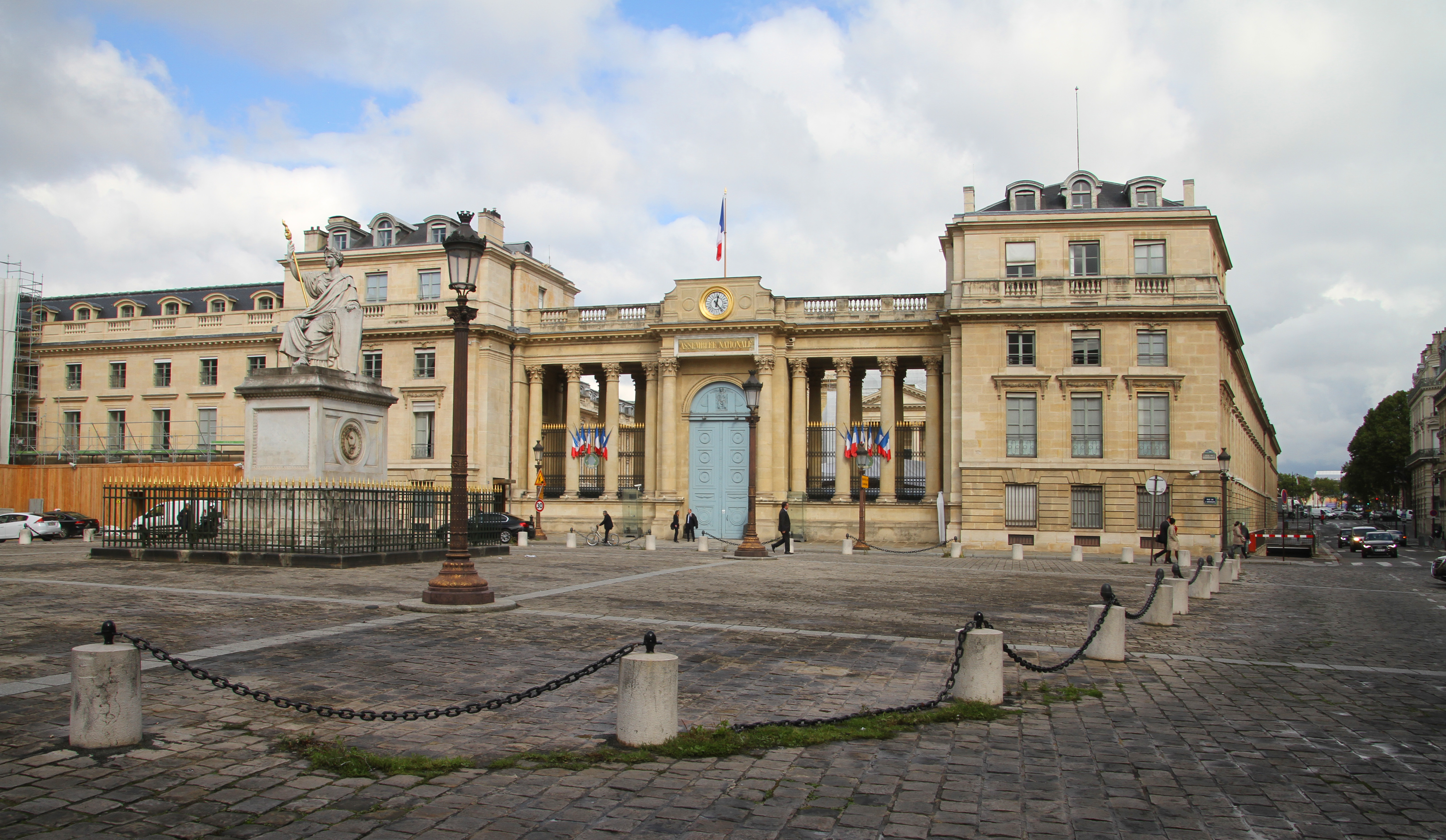
Palais Bourbon square and entrance.

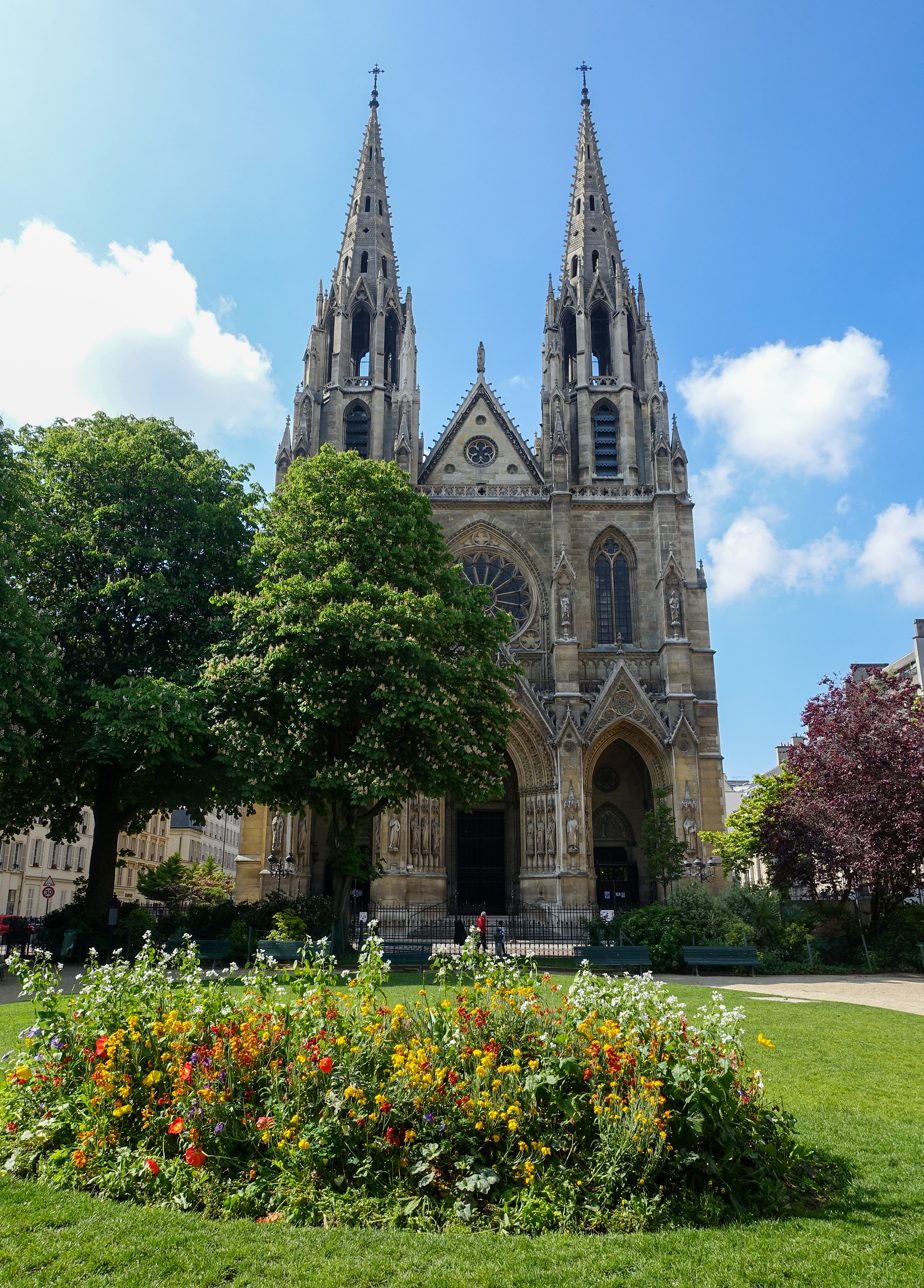
Samuel-Rousseau Square and the Basilica of Saint-Clotilde.
