= Antoine-Augustin Préault =

French sculptor (1809-1879)

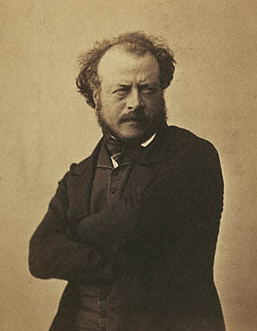
Auguste Préault by Nadar

Antoine-Augustin Préault (6 October 1809 – 11 January 1879) was a French sculptor of the Romantic movement. Born in the Marais district of Paris, he was better known during his lifetime as Auguste Préault.

== Biography ==
A student of David d'Angers, Préault first exhibited at the Paris Salon of 1833. He was not favorably looked upon by some of the artistic community's elite due to his outspokenness and because he was part of the circle of activists who participated in the French Revolution of 1830. During that period of turmoil, Préault's studio was vandalized and many of his plaster models were destroyed. As a result of these circumstances his work has been largely overshadowed by his contemporaries.

Antoine-Augustin Préault died in Paris in 1879 and was interred in the Père Lachaise Cemetery.

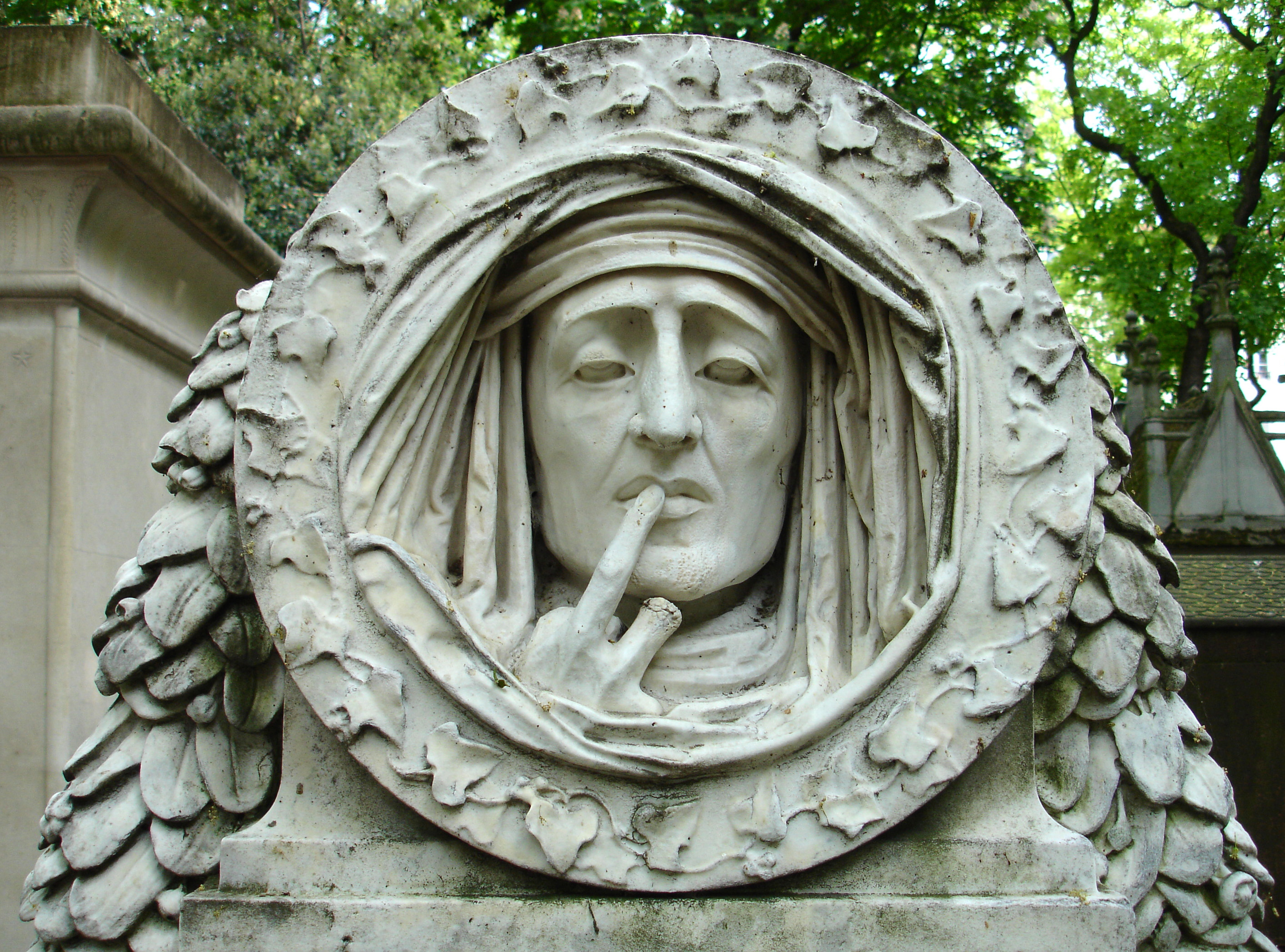
Silence (1842), Père Lachaise Cemetery, Paris

"The fever of poetry, the drunkenness of beauty, the horror of vulgarity, and the madness of glory possessed and tormented Préault"

Words of a nineteenth-century critic describing Préault's work:

"Before this retrospective, Préault's work had fallen into oblivion, three masterpieces excepted: Tuerie (The Killing) (Musée des Beaux Arts, Chartres), Ophelia (Musée d'Orsay) and the Christ in the Eglise Saint Gervais. The exhibition therefore allowed the public to discover anew the great aspects of his work: subjects inspired by literature (Ophelia, Dante, Virgil); portraits and medallions (Delacroix); funeral sculpture (Silence), which draws its strength from its atemporality; and such public commissions as the statue of Clemence Isaure in the Jardin du Luxembourg. By the sheer violence of his subjects, the novelty of his compositions and the spirit of his art, Préault may well deserve, as far as sculpture is concerned, the accolade of the greatest poet of unhappiness"

Comments by Musée d'0rsay at time of exhibition held on Preault's work.

Préault is buried in the Pere Lachaise cemetery.

== Works ==
| Name | Location | Photograph | Date | Notes |
|---|---|---|---|---|
| Medallion of Virgile | Musée d'Orsay | | 1855 | This bas-relief won Préault the Prix de Rome for sculpture in 1855. |
| Plaster medallion depicting Paul Huet | Musée d'Orsay | | 1869 | Huet was an accomplished French painter and Préault executed this medallion featuring Huet in profile in around 1869. The work was later cast in bronze and used on Huet's tomb in the Montparnasse cemetery. The plaster model is held in the collections of the Musée d'Orsay. Until 1985 it had been held by the Huet family before being given to the museum. |
| Medallion depicting Eugène Delacroix | Musée du Louvre département des Sculptures | | 1864 | Préault executed several medallions and many of these are held by the Musée du Louvre département des Sculptures. |
| Medallion depicting Sara Stephann | Musée du Louvre département des Sculptures | | 1832 | |
| Medallion depicting Dr.Devarennes | Musée du Louvre département des Sculptures | | 1838 | Devarennes was a doctor practicing at the Paris Hôpital de la Charité. |
| Medallion depicting Jean-Barthélémy Hauréau | Musée du Louvre département des Sculptures | | | Préault's executed this bronze medallion depicting the French historian Jean-Barthélémy Hauréau. Hauréau was also the curator of the Bibliothèque nationale and a director of the Imprimerie nationale then a director of the Thiers foundation. |
| Medallion depicting Dr.Arthur de Beauvoisy | Musée du Louvre département des Sculptures | | 1837 | |
| Medallion depicting Christophe Pittermann | Musée du Louvre département des Sculptures | | | The date this bronze medallion was executed is not known. |
| Head of a young man | Musée du Château de Blois | | 1869 | This bronze Préault medallion depicting the "Tête de jeune homme" dates to 1869. |
| Medallion depicting Lelia | Musée du Château de Blois | | 1850 | Bronze medallion. |
| Medallions depicting Auguste Vacquerie and Maximilien de Robespierre | Musée des Beaux Arts, Lille | | | This museum holds medallions depicting Auguste Vacquerie the French journalist and man of letters, and Maximilien de Robespierre It also holds a medallion depicting Thomas Shotter Boys. |
| Tomb of Charles-Michel de l'Épée | Paris | | | Preault executed sculptural work for the tomb of Charles-Michel de L'Épée in the église Saint-Roch in Paris. The tomb is located in the chapel of St Suzanne. |
| La Mendicité | | | 1839 | |
| Vénus et le Sphinx/Jupiter et le Sphinx | Château de Fontainebleau | | 1870 | These two works were commissioned for the garden of the Château de Fontainebleau. |
| Croix de chemin | Ingouville | | 1861 | Préault executed this depiction of Christ on the cross. The figure of Christ is in bronze and the cross limestone. |
| The tomb of the actor Rouvière | | | | Préault's medallion was used on the tomb of the French actor Philibert Rouvière. |
| Église Saint-Joseph-des-Carmes | Paris | | | For this Paris church, Préault carved a high-relief in wood depicting two angels on either side of a medallion. This church is located at 70 rue de Vaugirard in the 6th arrondissement. |
| Bust of Nicolas Poussin | Amiens | | | Préault's marble bust of Nicolas Poussin can be seen in the musée de Picardie in Amiens. |
| "Cavalier gaulois" on the Pont d'Iéna | Paris | | 1853 | This limestone sculpture is one of four equestrian statues on the bridge. The others are a Roman warrior by Louis-Joseph Daumas, an Arab warrior by Jean-Jacques Feuchère and a Greek warrior by François Devault. |
| The tomb of Jacob Roblès | Paris | | | The sculptural work on this tomb is amongst the most remarkable in the Père Lachaise Cemetery in Paris and features the composition "Le Silence" The Institute of Chicago wrote "The rounded known as Le Silence was created for the tomb of Jacob Robles [1782-1842] in the Jewish section of the Parisian cemetery Pere Lachaise. Abandoning traditional funerary imagery, Auguste Préault fashioned an enigmatic and mysterious evocation of death in the skeletal face which is shrouded in drapery with a finger touching the lips. In part the image drew upon the traditional monastic symbol for silence in the cloisters, but here the sculptor also conveys a sense of ambiguity by leaving open whether the figure is living or dead. When Préault exhibited a bronze cast of Le Silence in 1849, it was hailed as "one of the representative works of modern art" and became an icon of Romanticism" |
| Église St-Gervais-et-St-Protais | Paris | | | This Paris church dates back to 1212 and Préault was the sculptor of the church's statue of Saint Gervais. He also sculpted the figure of Christ in the chapel containing the baptismal fonts. It was at this church that a German shell, fired by the long-range "Paris Gun", fell on 29 March 1918 killing 88 people and wounding 68 others; the explosion collapsed the roof when a Good Friday service was in progress. This was the worst single incident involving a loss of civilian lives during the German bombardment of Paris in 1918. Among those killed was Rose-Marie Ormond Andre-Michel, the niece and a favorite model of John Singer Sargent. |
| Saint-Paul-Saint-Louis | Paris | | | This church is located in the rue Saint-Antoine in the "Marais" district of Paris. The church contains many fine sculptures including a statue of St Catherine by Préault. |
| Tuerie Fragment épisodique d'un grand bas-relief | Musée des Beaux-Arts de Chartres | | 1834 | This controversial bronze bas-relief by Préault is held in the Musée des Beaux-arts in Chartres. Tuerie means slaughter and in this stark composition, Préault leaves little to the imagination. |
| Monument to the Morin-Chalon Family | Paris | | | Préault executed a medallion for this family grave in the Père Lachaise Cemetery. Préault depicts the head of a woman whose hand covers her face in a stark portrayal of grief. |
| "Vague" | Dijon | | 1856 | This terracotta composition by Préault is thought to date to 1856 and is in fact the only terracotta model of Préault's still surviving. This work is held in Dijon's Musée Magnin. Préault depicts an ondine. It seems that ondines or water-sprites were a popular subject for the writers of "littérature fantastique" and Paracelsus made reference to them in his writings on alchemy. In European folklore they are depicted as fairy-like creatures. |
| Medallion depicting Théodore Géricault | Rouen | | | This Préault work depicting the French painter Théodore Géricault is held in the Musée des Beaux Arts of Rouen. |
| Medallion depicting Aulus Vitellius | Toulouse | | | This bronze medallion is held in Toulouse in the Musée des Augustins. Aulus Vitellius Germanicus Augustus was Roman Emperor from 16 April to 22 December 69. |
| Medallion for the Tomb of Adam Mickiewicz | Paris | | | This composition by Préault is held in the Bibliothèque Polonaise in Paris. |
| Statues in the gardens of the Château de Versailles | Château de Versailles | | | Préault was commissioned to sculpt statues of André Le Nôtre the gardener, and Jules Hardouin-Mansart the architect, for the Château de Versailles gardens. Hardouin-Mansart was one of the most important European architects of the seventeenth century and much favoured by Louis XIV. Le Nôtre was Louis XIV"s favourite gardener and was responsible for the design and construction of the Palace of Versailles parkland. His work represents the height of the French formal garden style, or "jardin à la française". |
| Work on the façade of the Louvre | Paris | | | At the two extremities of the façade of the Henri IV and Henri I1 wings in the Louvre's Napoléon courtyard are two large sculptural groups executed by Préault between 1856 and 1857. The works are allegories of War and Peace. Also in the so-called "New Louvre" and the Henri II wing of that building there is a statue of André Chénier. Chénier was a French poet much associated with the events of the French Revolution. He was guillotined for alleged "crimes against the state", near the end of the Reign of Terror Finally in the Pavilion de la Bibliothèque is Préault's composition "Les Arts" Préault had been commissioned to design a three-figure allegorical grouping for the Pavilion de la Bibliothèque and he created groups of angels with the theme of the arts and sciences. On the left, an angel twirls a giant sash in a parabolic arch: an ingenious tribute to Mathematics. At the angel's feet, a pair of cherubs twist to gaze upward at him, one with a long parchment scroll of Architecture draped across his lap. The other plays Music with a lyre, while a mask for Theatre rounds the angle of the plinth ornamented with the spherical astrolabe of Astronomy. The crown in the hand of the brawny angel on the right is Physics, Préault recalling Archimedes’ experiment in buoyancy to test the gold content of King Hiero's crown. The palm branch waving triumphantly in the angel's other hand symbolizes Grammar, while at his feet is Geometry, a grinning cherub with a compass. His counterpart, holding palette and brushes, portrays Painting, while Sculpture is evoked by the fine feminine profile medallion on the plinth. An 1857 critic lauded Préault's génies—the French term for angels on civic buildings—as "having nothing of that charming preciousness of those of the 18th century: they are strong and dense children, as a well-grounded art could form them: they dare to have muscles and stand out in vigorous contours against the sky." |
| Works in the Hirshhorn Museum and Sculpture Garden | Washington | | 1856 | There are two Préault works in this museum in Washington, United States. One is a medallion featuring "Rachel" and a second bronze medallion depicts Harriet Smithson |
| Sculpture of Mary Magdalene | Paris | | | Préault was responsible for the carving of Mary Magdalene in the La Madeleine. Mary is kneeling before some relics. An interesting observation by Préault on the "cult of the relic" popular amongst French intellectuals at the time. |
| Clémence Isaure | Paris | | 1843 | Préault was the sculptor of the statue of Clémence Isaure in the Jardin de Luxembourg in Paris. This was one of a series of sculptures entitled "The Queens of France and Famous Women" comprising 20 marble sculptures arranged around a large pond in front of the Palais du Luxembourg. Louis-Philippe I himself chose the women to be portrayed and most of the sculptures were commissioned around 1843 and for around 12,000 francs each. They were exhibited in the Paris Salons of 1847 or 1848. The musée du Louvre holds a bronze version of the work, cast by Thiebault. |
| Jacques Coeur | Bourges | | | Préault was the sculptor of the statue of Jacques Coeur in Bourges. |
| Statue of François Séverin Marceau | Chartres, place des Epars | | 1845 | |
| Ondine | Beaune | | | This bronze work by Préault is located in the Beaune Musée des Beaux-Arts. The museum wrote:- "This sculpture taken from contemporary literature was placed in the Bouzaise Park in Beaune until 1996. At the government's request it was put back in the museum after having been exhibited at the Musée d'Orsay in a one-man exhibition of the sculptor's work. The work is extremely interesting and original. The general movement in a spiral, the violence between the opposition of the position of shoulders and hips, all combine to give this figure a feeling of unrest" |
| Ophelie | musée d'Orsay | | | "Ophelia is shown drifting lifeless on the water. With closed eyes and parted mouth, she escapes the stiffness of death. The waves intermingle with the folds of the wet sheet wound around the girl, emphasising the curve of her limbs. Designed like a funerary plaque from the Middle Ages or the Renaissance, the sculpture is nonetheless presented as a picture. Its sad, poetic mood is typical of the Romantic artists' reading of the work of the English playwright" Extract from Musée d'Orsay article. This plaster relief, subsequently cast in bronze by Thiebaut, dates to 1876. It was turned down by the Paris Salon of 1849 but accepted and shown in 1850–1851. Purchased by the French State in 1876, the work was subsequently deposited in the musée de Saint-Florentin in Yonne in 1879 but destroyed during the Second World War. The musée d'Orsay holds the original plaster model of this work. |
| Medallion depicting Dante | muséee d'Orsay | | 1852 | This Préault work dates to around 1852 and it was cast in bronze by Eck and Durand. Dante is shown in high-relief and on the medallion Préault includes the words " LA / VITA-NUOVA / LA / DIVINA / COMMEDIA h.g. : DANTE / ALIGHIERI / NE : A / FLORENCE / 1265 / MORT / 1321" The Musée d'Orsay hold Préault's plaster model. |
| Statue of Sainte Valère in the église Sainte Clotilde | Paris | | | |

== Gallery ==
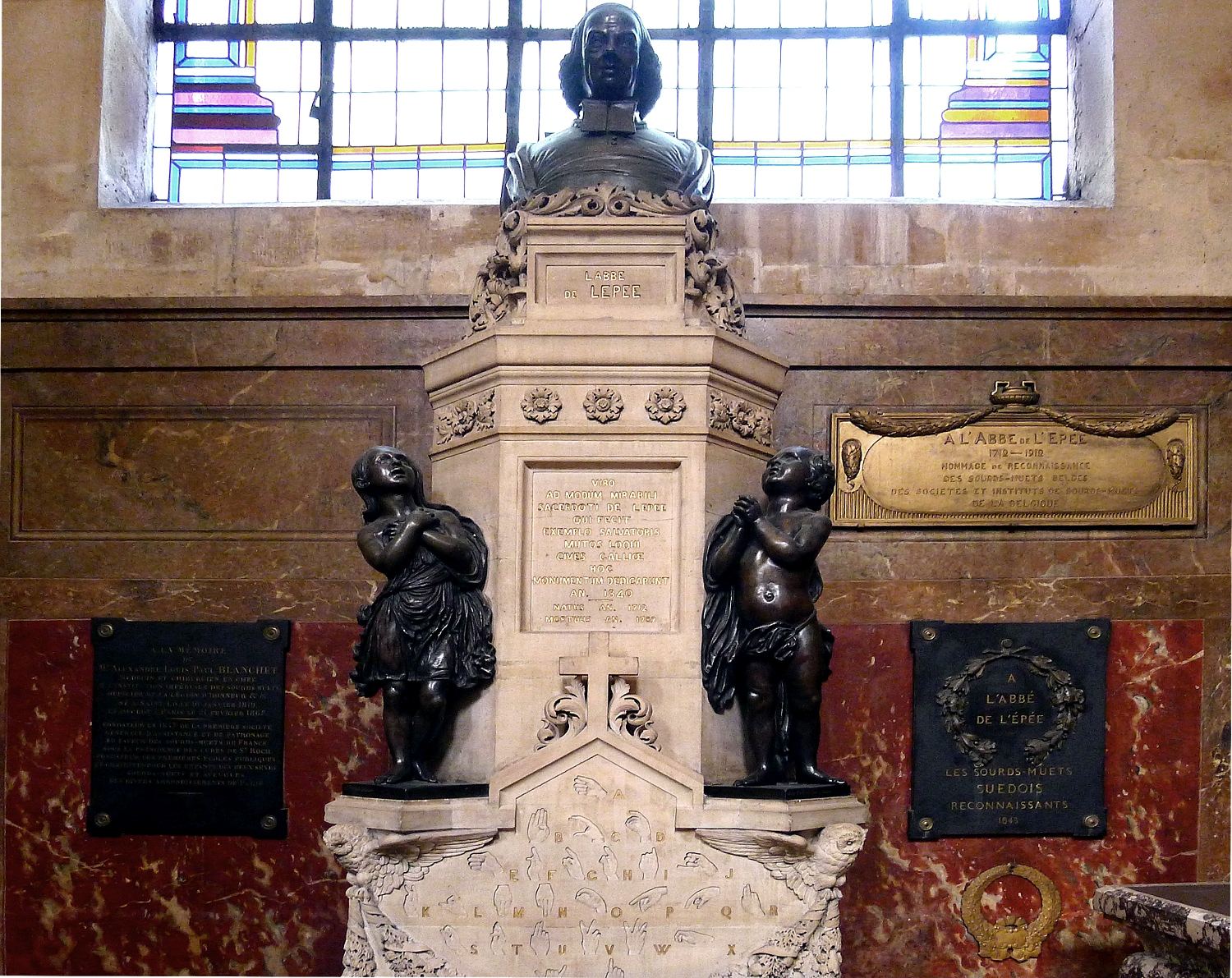
Tomb of Charles-Michel de L'Épée by Antoine-Augustin Préault in the Saint-Roch church in Paris.

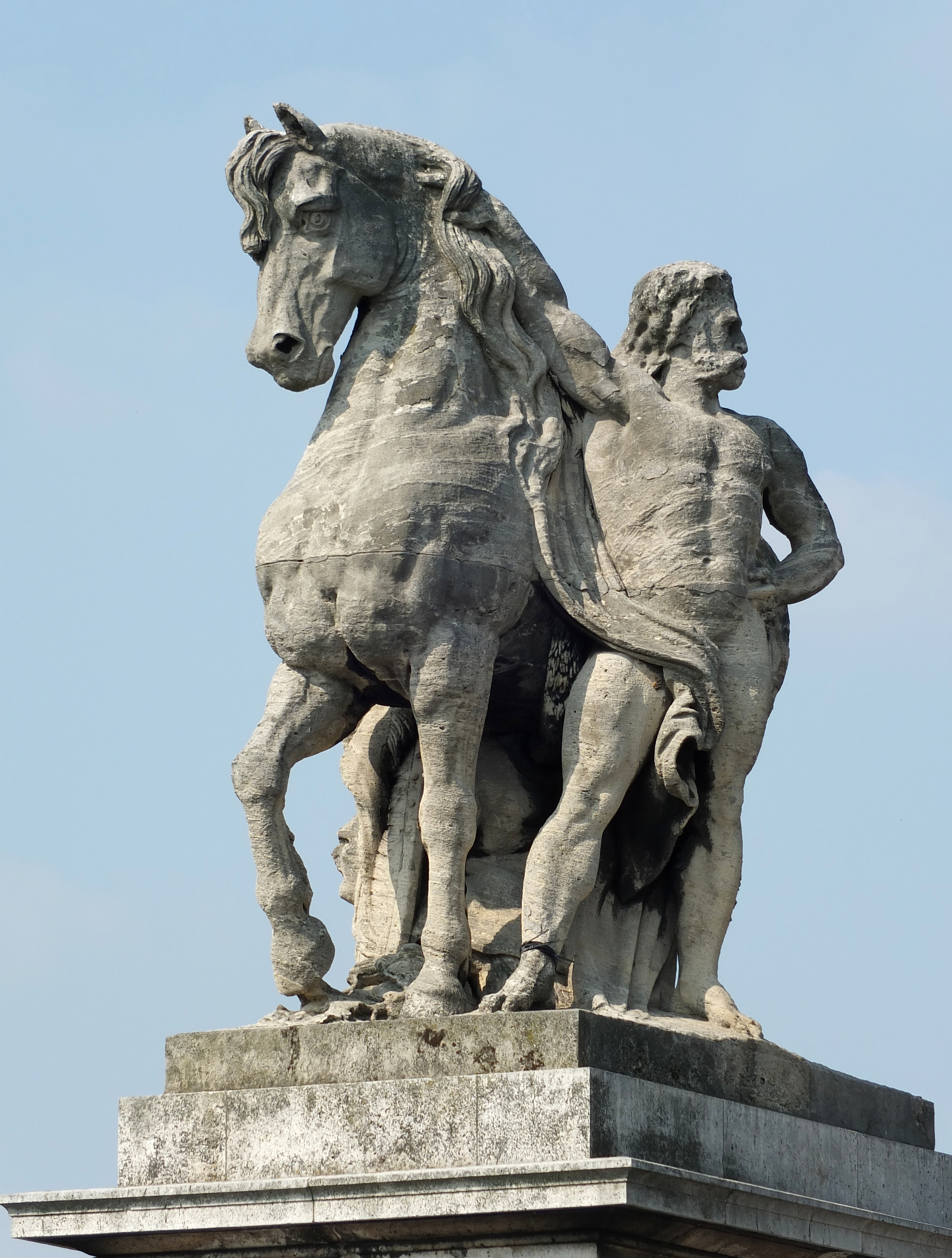
"Cavalier gaulois" by Antoine-Augustin Préault. Sculpture on Pont d'Iéna

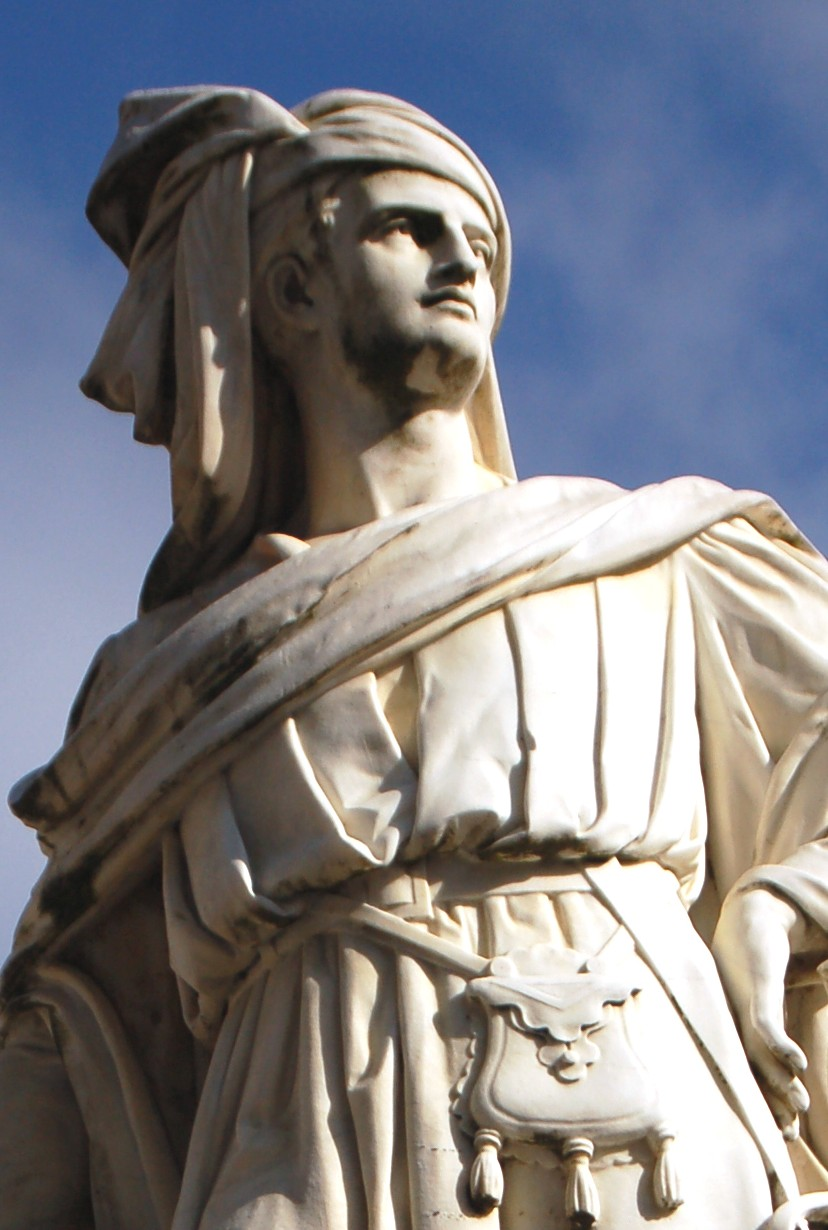
The head of Jacques Coeur. Jacques Coeur's statue by Préault is located in Bourges.

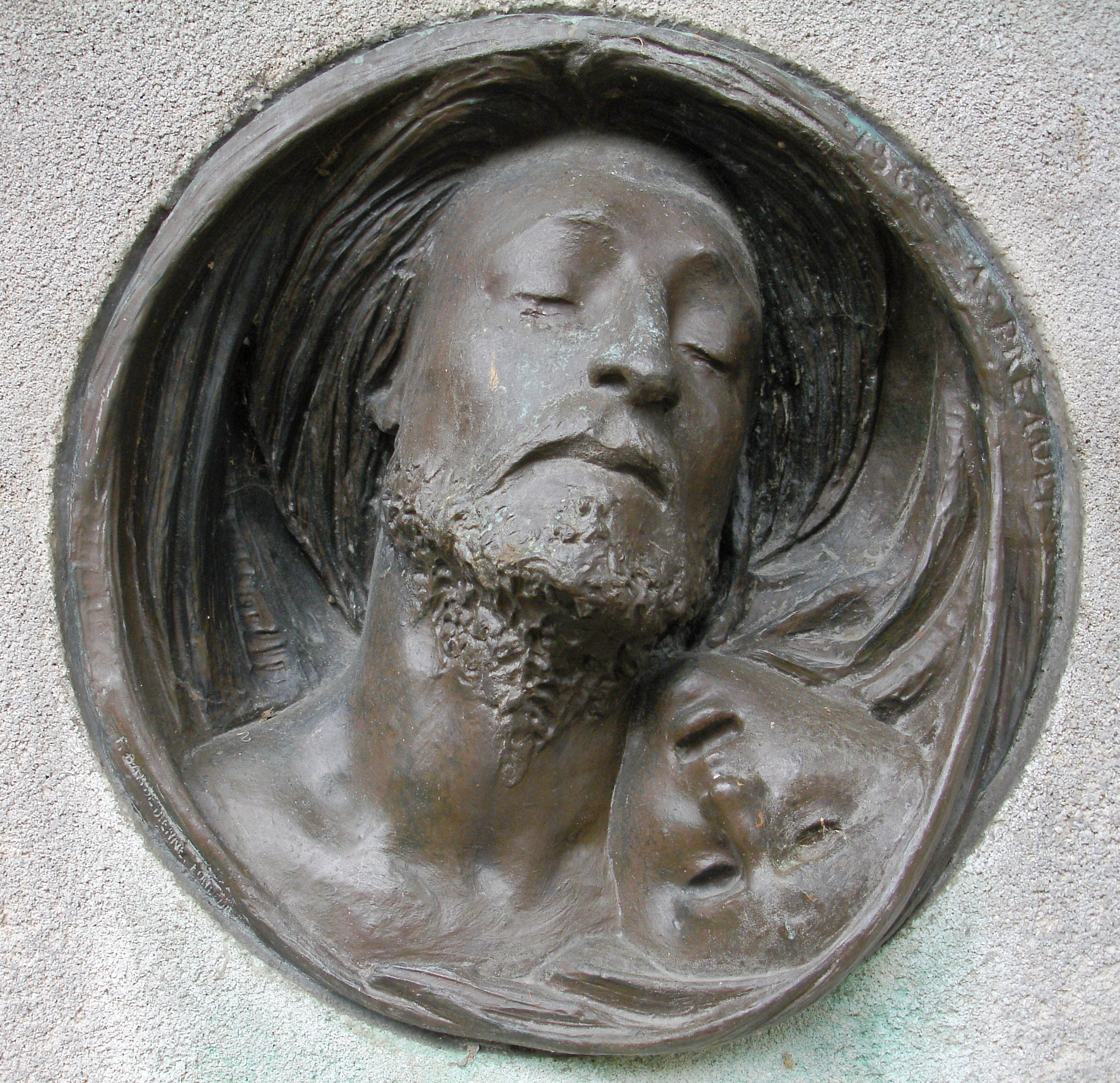
Antoine-Augustin Préault medallion on Rouvière's tomb.

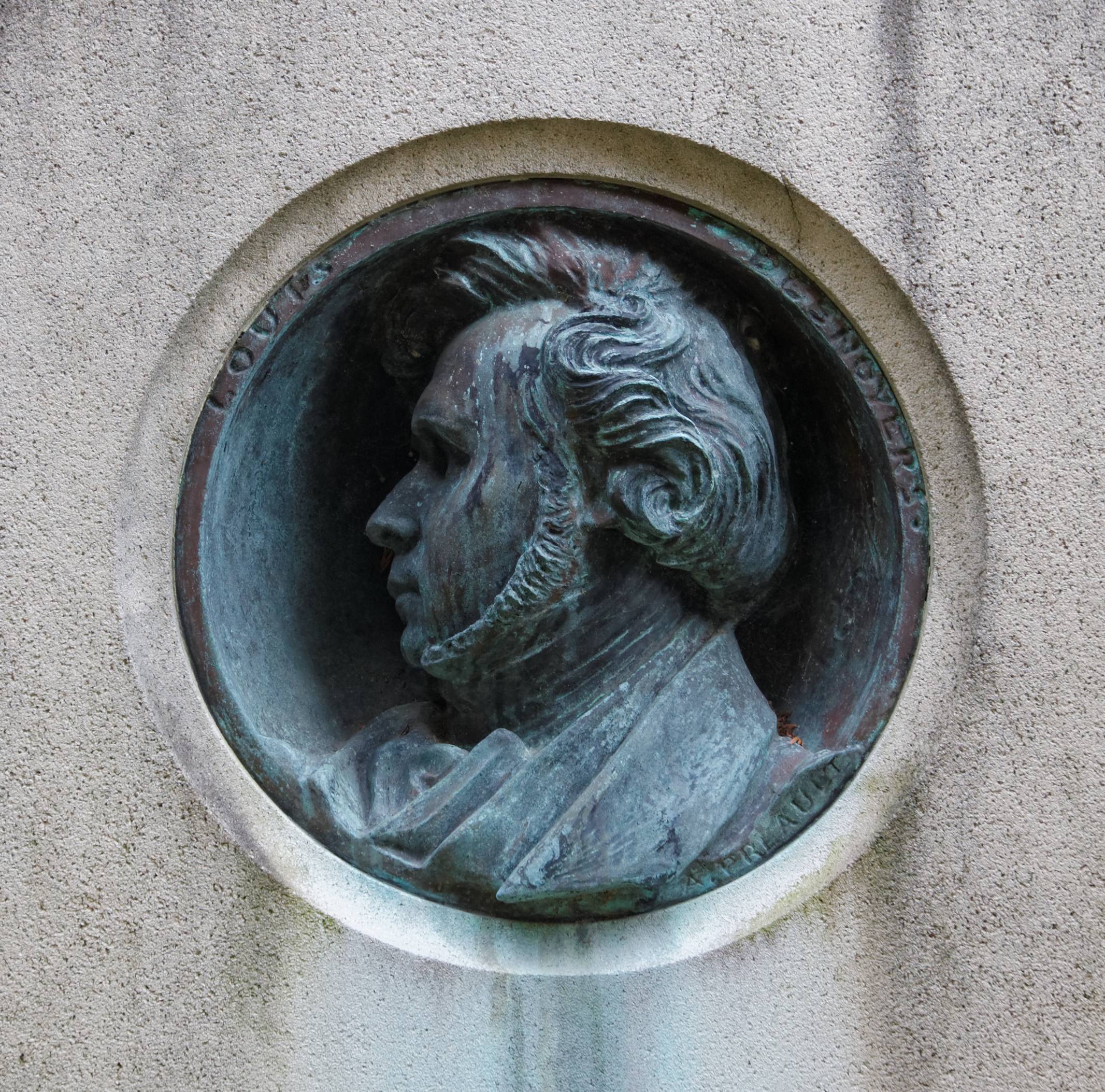
Antoine-Augustin Préault medallion on the tomb of Desnoyers in Père-Lachaise cemetery.

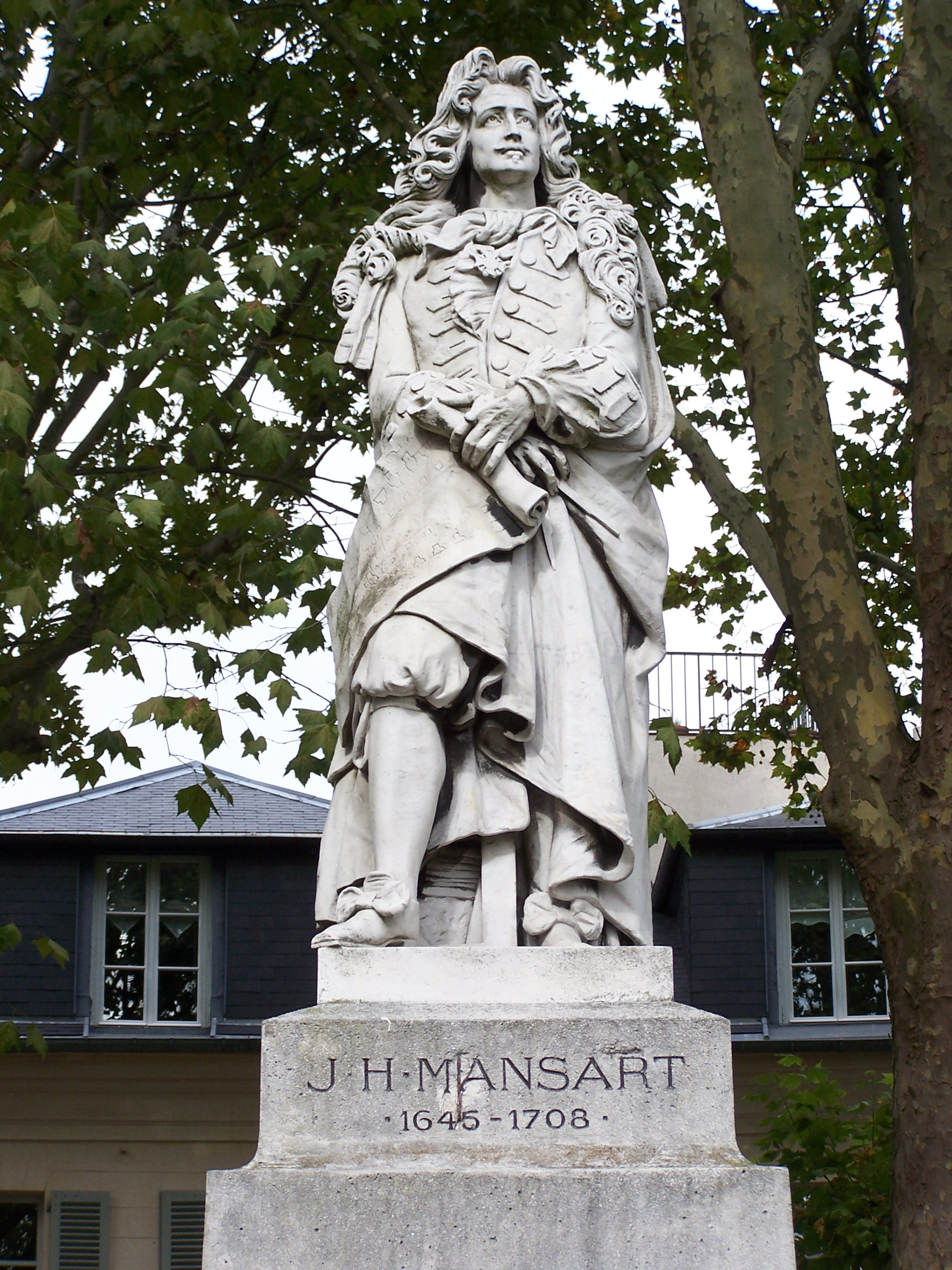
Statue of the architect J.H. Mansart at Versailles by Antoine-Augustin Préault.

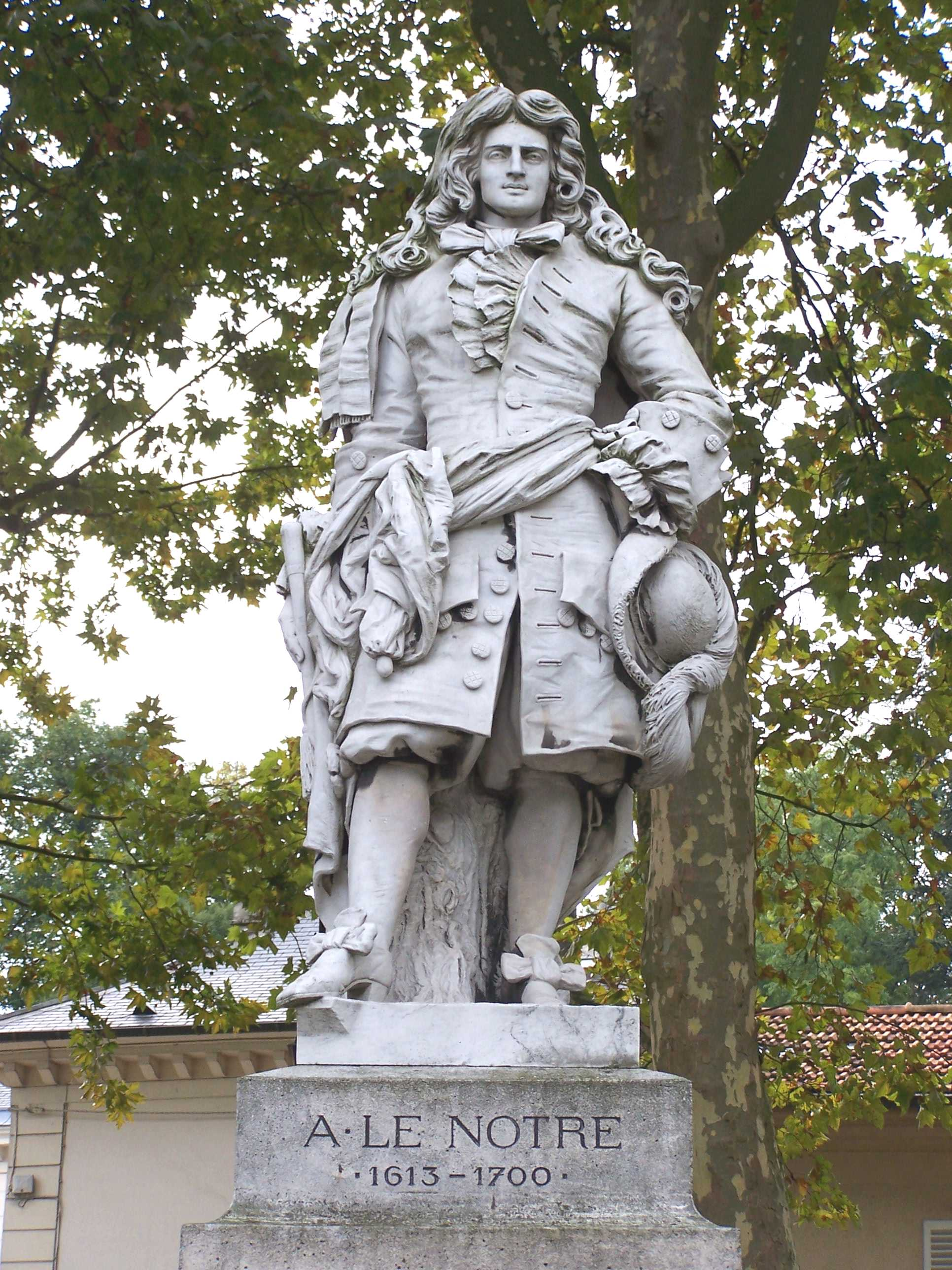
Antoine-Augustin Préault's statue of André Le Nôtre a landscape architect and the gardener of King Louis XIV of France. He was most notably responsible for the construction of the park of the Palace of Versailles

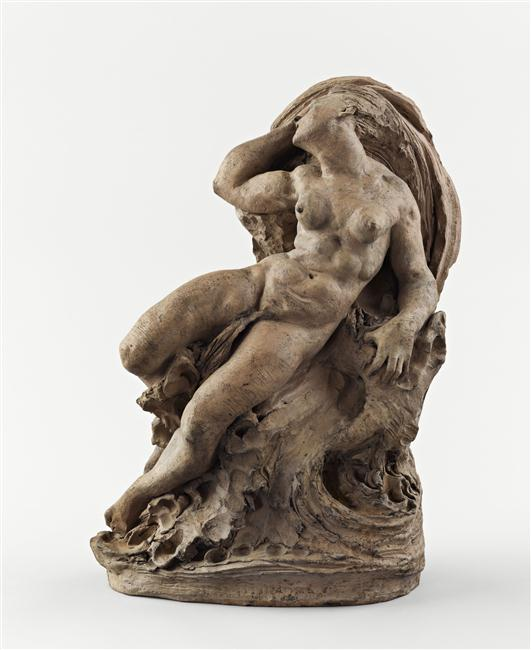
Preault's composition "Vague"- Study of the contorted body of a water-sprite

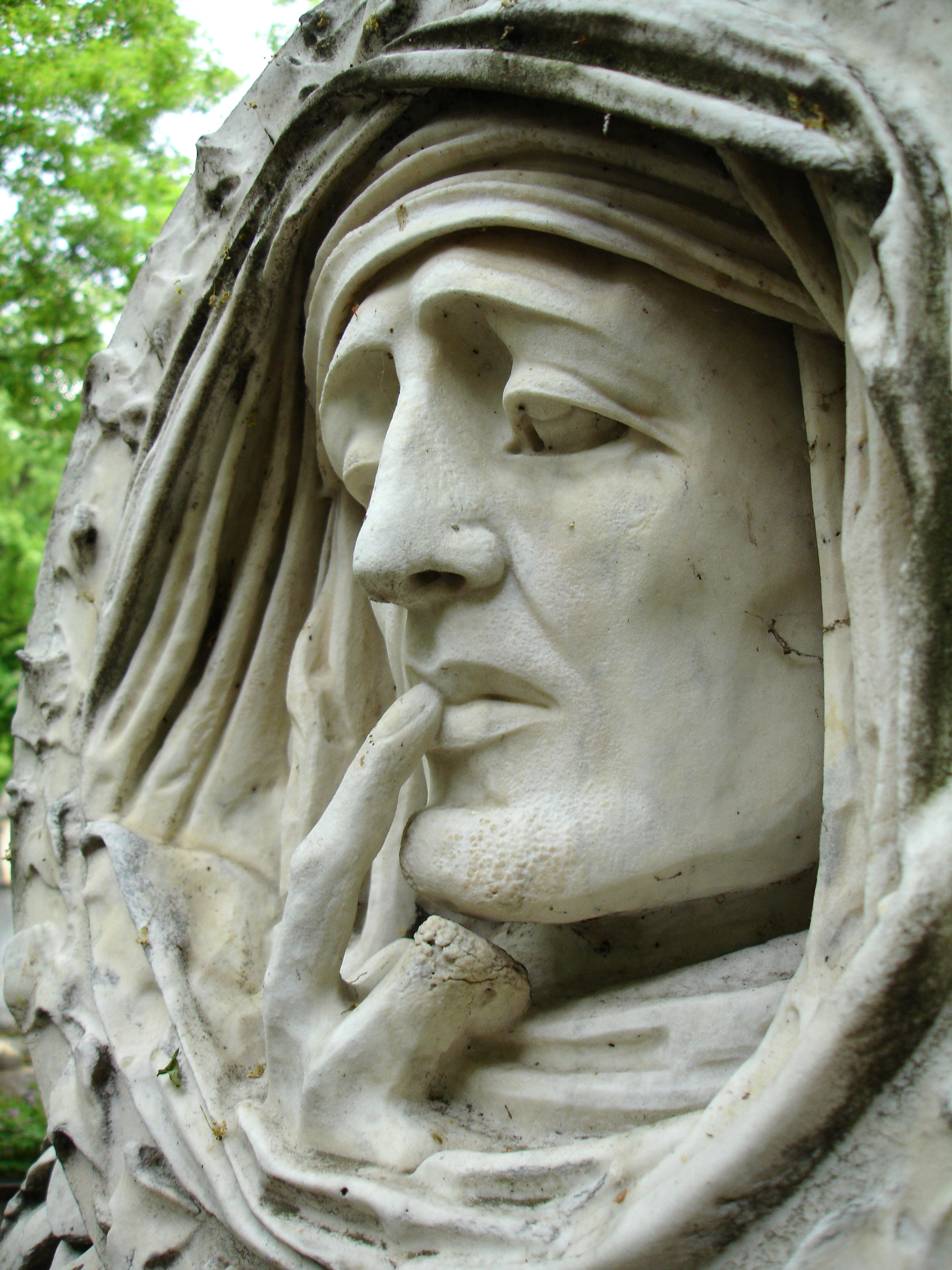
Préault's enigmatic composition called "Le Silence" used on the tomb of Jacob Roblès

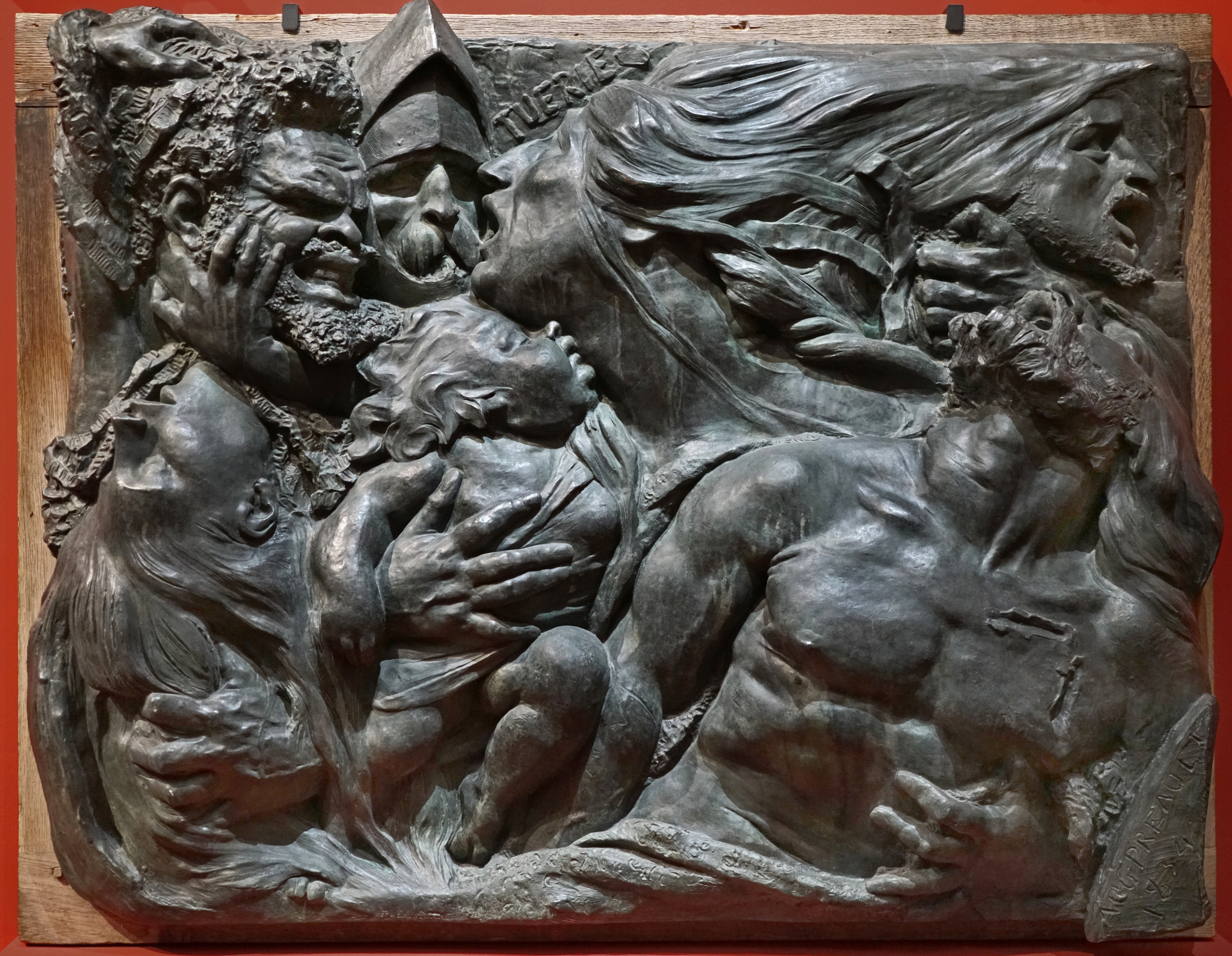
Tuerie, 1834, musée des beaux-arts de Chartres.

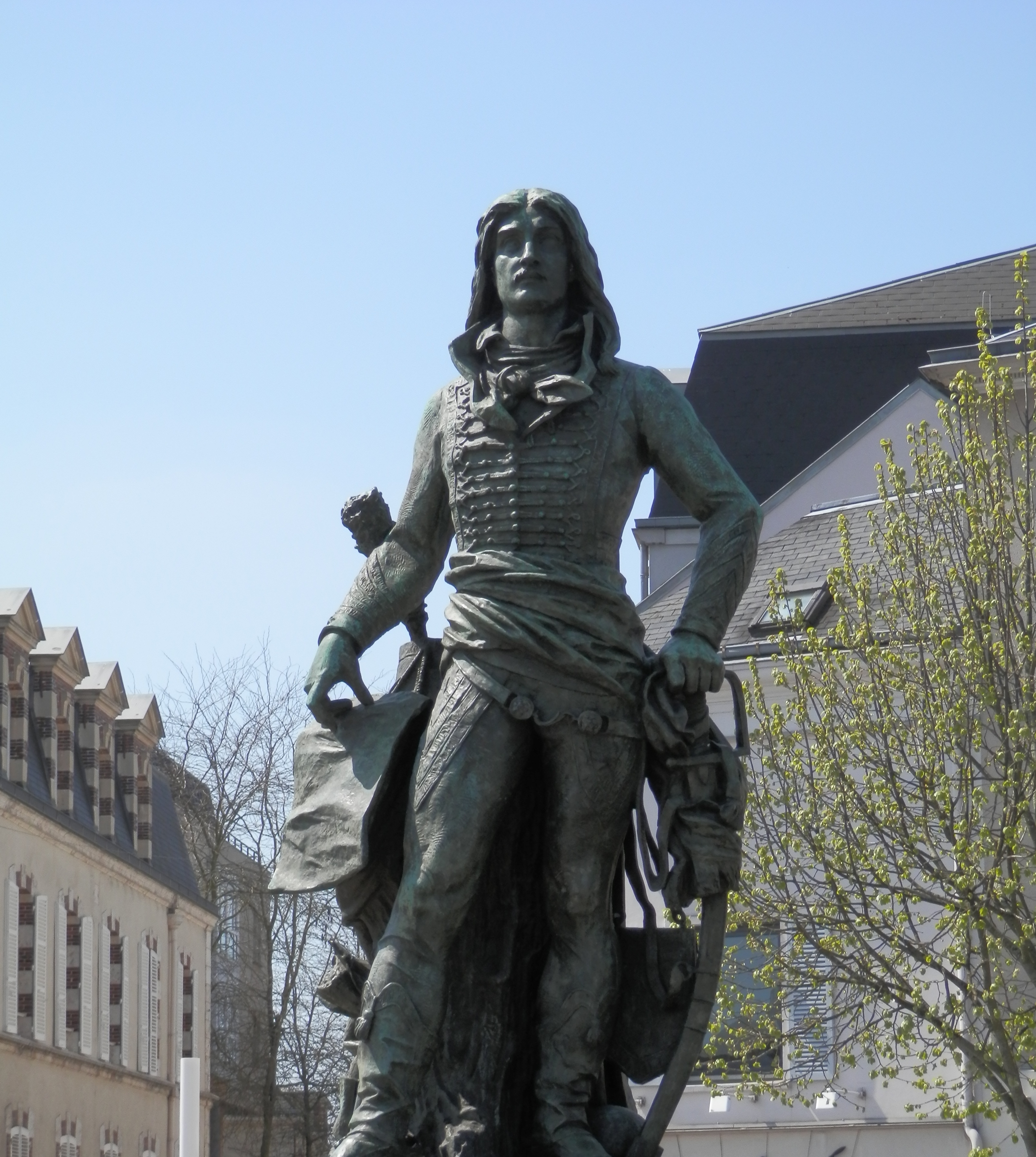
Marceau statue in Chartres, 1845.

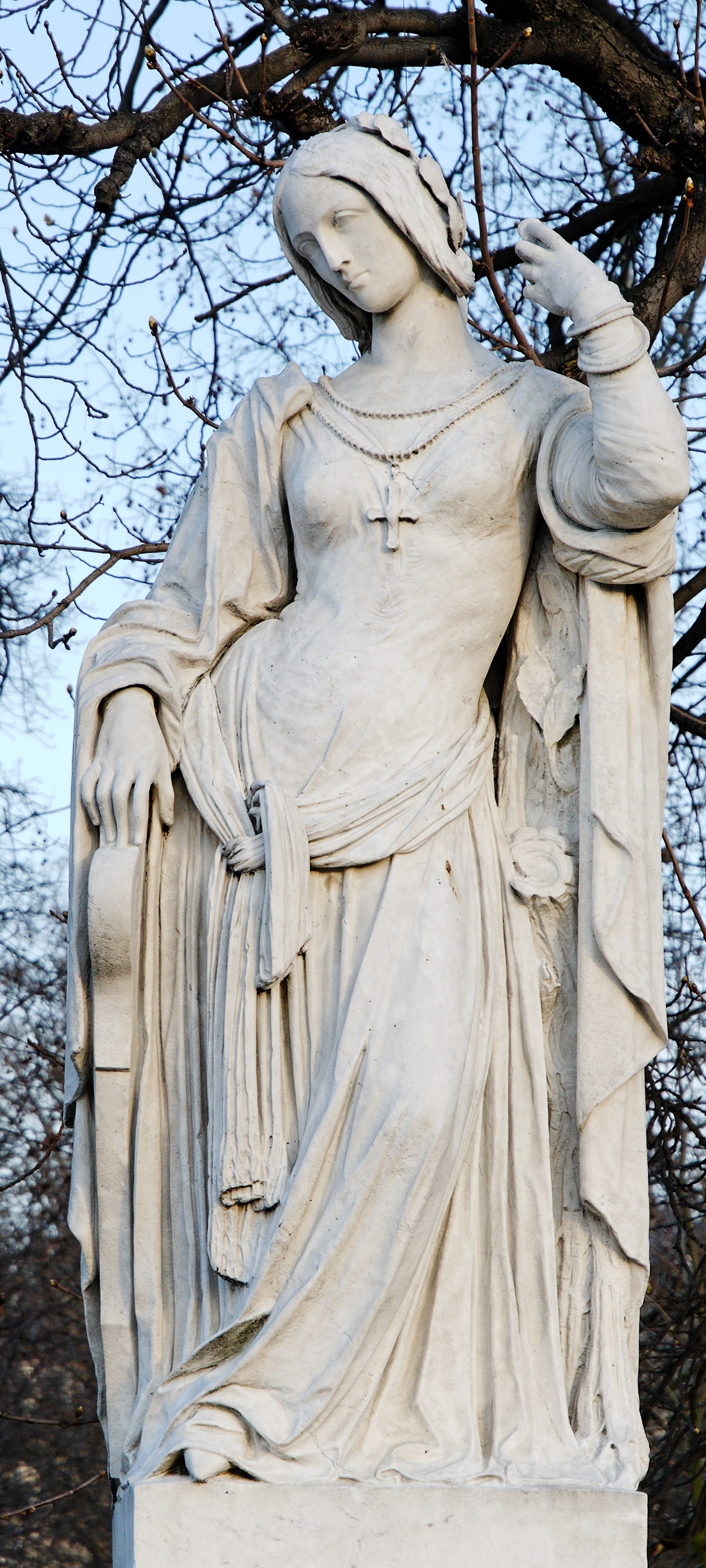
Clémence Isaure by Préault, Jardin du Luxembourg

== References B ==
- Auguste Préault : sculpteur romantique, . Author: compilation. (1997) Gallimard
