= Jacques-Léonard Maillet =

French sculptor

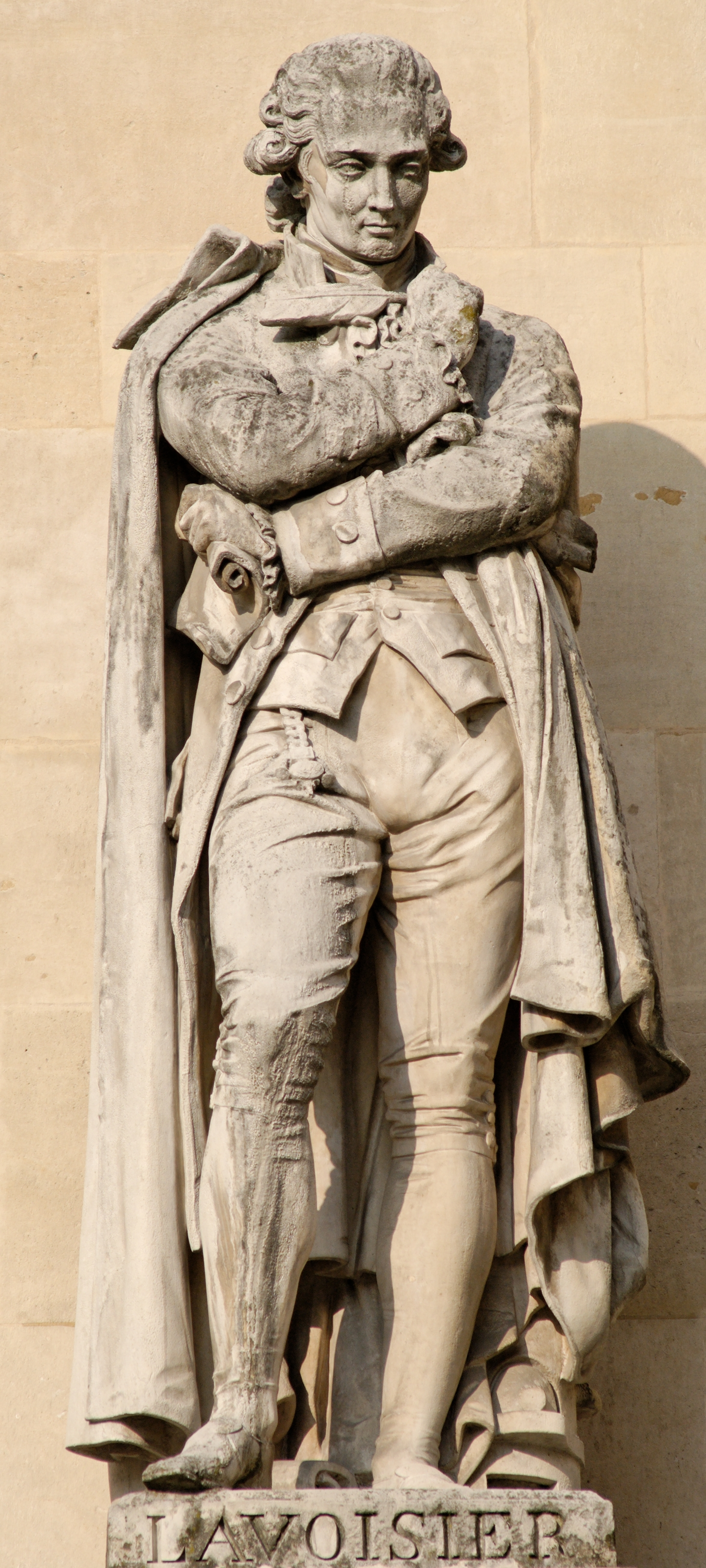
Lavoisier on the façade of the Cour Napoléon, Louvre

Jacques-Léonard Maillet (French pronunciation: [ʒak leɔnaʁ majɛ]; 12 July 1823 - 14 February 1894) was a French academic sculptor of modest reputation, whose themes were of neoclassical and biblical inspiration; his public commissions were in large part for the programs of decorative architectural sculpture required by the grandiose public works programs characteristic of the Second Empire, which included commemorative portraits of French culture heroes. He also provided models for goldsmith's work.

Maillet was born in Paris, the son of a menuisier, or carver of furniture and panelling, of the working-class district, the Faubourg Saint-Antoine.

His earliest training had been in a drawing school in the Faubourg Saint-Antoine, before he entered the école des Beaux-Arts at the age of seventeen, 1 October 1840. There he studied with Jean-Jacques Feuchère, the heir of Pierre-Philippe Thomire Napoleon's official maker of bronzes d'ameublement winning a second prize in the Prix de Rome, 1841. Then he studied under James Pradier, where he absorbed Pradier's style, combining a neoclassical treatment with sentimental subject matter and a taste for genre, but developed a reputation for overconfident laziness.

In 1847 he received the premier grand prix de Rome on the given subject, Telemachus bringing back to Phalantes the ashes of Hippias and spent four years as a pensionnaire at the French Academy in Rome, which was the entry to every public career in sculpture in nineteenth-century France. A letter of Gustave Flaubert records the welcome extended to him and Maxime Du Camp.

He was also interested in the technical aspects of art, and invented a polychroming process for mass-produced objects.

In 1851, he returned to France, where he married Adrienne Désirée Vare, 31 December 1856; they had three daughters before separating; Mme Maillet raised her girls at Précy-sur-Oise. After her death, Maillet married the poet Jenny Grimault Touzin, already too ill to be moved from her domicile. At his death, two years later, he was buried in the Père Lachaise Cemetery, Paris, with no monument to mark the site.

== Selected works ==
- Agrippina et Caligula, Salon of 1853; his first entry in a Salon, it won a first-place medal
- Lavoisier, for the Cour Napoléon of the Louvre.
- Agrippine portant les cendres de Germanicus, Salon of 1861.
