= Pont d'Iéna =

Bridge in Paris

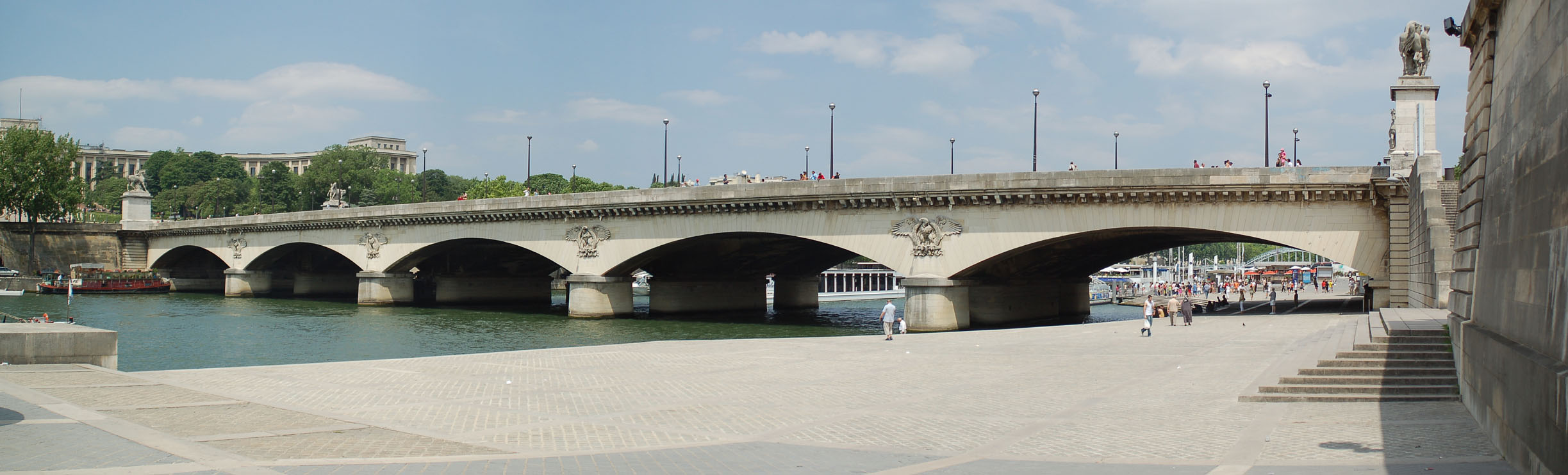
- Pont d'Iéna
- Coordinates: 48°51′35″N 02°17′32″E
- Crosses: Seine
- Locale: Paris, France
- Official name: Pont d'Iéna
- Maintained by: civil service
- Next upstream: Passerelle Debilly
- Next downstream: Pont de Bir-Hakeim

Characteristics
- Design: Arch bridge
- Total length: 155 m (509 ft)
- Width: 35 m (115 ft)

History
- Opened: 1814

Statistics
- Daily traffic: pedestrians and cyclists

Location
- Interactive map of Pont d'Iéna

Pont d'Iéna (French: [pɔ̃ djena]; English: Jena Bridge) is a bridge spanning the River Seine in Paris. It links the Eiffel Tower on the Left Bank to the district of Trocadéro on the Right Bank.

== History ==
In 1807, an imperial decree issued by Napoleon I ordered the construction of a bridge overlooking the Military School, and named it after his victory in 1806 at the Battle of Jena, disregarding other names considered previously: pont du Champ-de-Mars and pont de l'École militaire.

During the occupation of Paris by the Allies, Prussian General Blücher wanted to destroy the Pont d'Iéna, which was named after a French victory against Prussia. The Prefect of Paris tried everything to change the mind of Blücher, without success, and finally went to Talleyrand asking him whether he could write a letter to the General asking him not to destroy the bridge. Talleyrand instead wrote to Tsar Alexander, who was in person in Paris, asking him to grant to the people of Paris the favour of inaugurating himself the bridge under a new name (Pont de l'École militaire). The Tsar accepted, and Blücher could not then destroy a bridge inaugurated by an Ally. The name of the bridge was reverted to its original name under Louis-Philippe at Talleyrand's instigation.

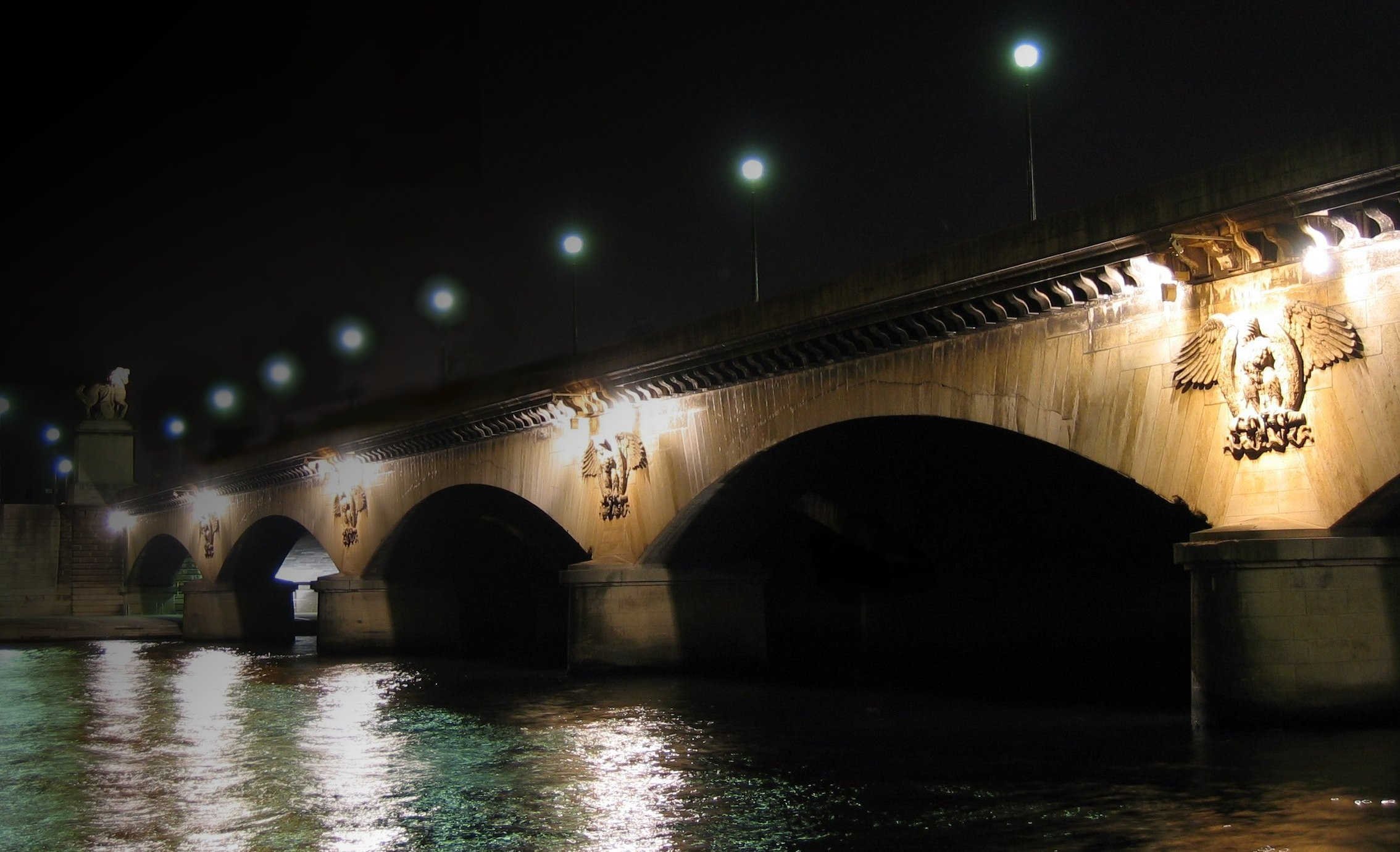
The Pont d'Iéna at night.

The structure was designed with five arches, each with an arc length of 28 m, and four intermediate piers. The initial construction, the cost of which was enormous at the time, was fully financed by the State and spanned six years from 1808 to 1814.

The tympana along the sides of the bridge had been originally decorated with imperial eagles conceptualized by François-Frédéric Lemot and sculpted by Jean-François Mouret. The eagles were replaced with the royal letter "L" soon after the fall of the First Empire in 1815 but in 1852, when Napoléon III ascended the throne of the Second Empire, new imperial eagles, this time by the chisel of Antoine-Louis Barye, replaced the royal "L".

Put in place in 1853, on the two ends of the bridge, are four sculptures sitting on top of four corresponding pylons: a Gallic warrior by Antoine-Augustin Préault and a Roman warrior by Louis-Joseph Daumas by the Right Bank; an Arab warrior by Jean-Jacques Feuchère and a Greek warrior by François-Théodore Devaulx by the Left Bank.

Towards the second half of the 19th century, the inadequacy of the bridge's carrying capacity started to become a pronounced problem. With the increasing traffic resulting from the expansion of the districts of Trocadéro, Auteuil and Passy, the necessity to enlarge the structure (the width of which was no more than 14 m, including the pavements) in a durable fashion grew as time went on.

Not until 1937, with the prospect of the upcoming World Fair drawing closer, did the French government decide to execute the project, which was all the more necessary as the structure was starting to show sure signs of deterioration. As well as the widening operation, reduced to just 35 meters from the planned 40 meters, the project also transformed the bridge with two additional concrete elements placed at either end, joining to the existing bridge with metal girders. Stone facings were used to protect the concrete tympana, the imperial eagles put back in place and the four statues repositioned accordingly during the bridge expansion.

This bridge has been part of the supplementary registry of historic monuments since 1975.

The steps leading off the bridge are popularly known among film fans as the "Renault stairs", as they featured in a scene in A View to a Kill where James Bond (played by Roger Moore) drove a hijacked Renault 11 taxi down the steps in pursuit of an assassin later revealed to be May Day (Grace Jones).

Since the 2024 Summer Olympics, the bridge is only accessible for pedestrians and cyclists.

== Gallery ==
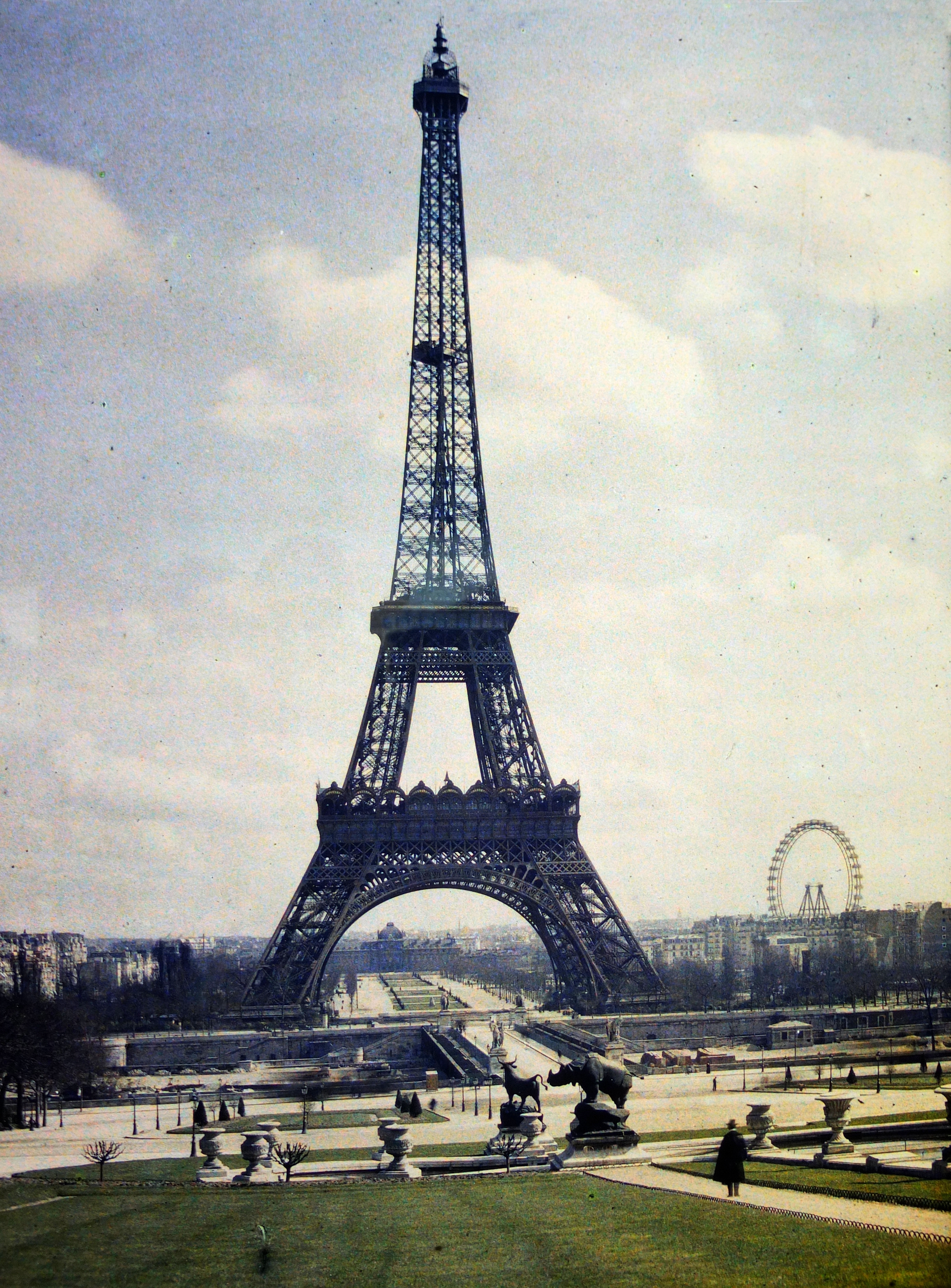
Pont d'Iéna in Paris (1914)

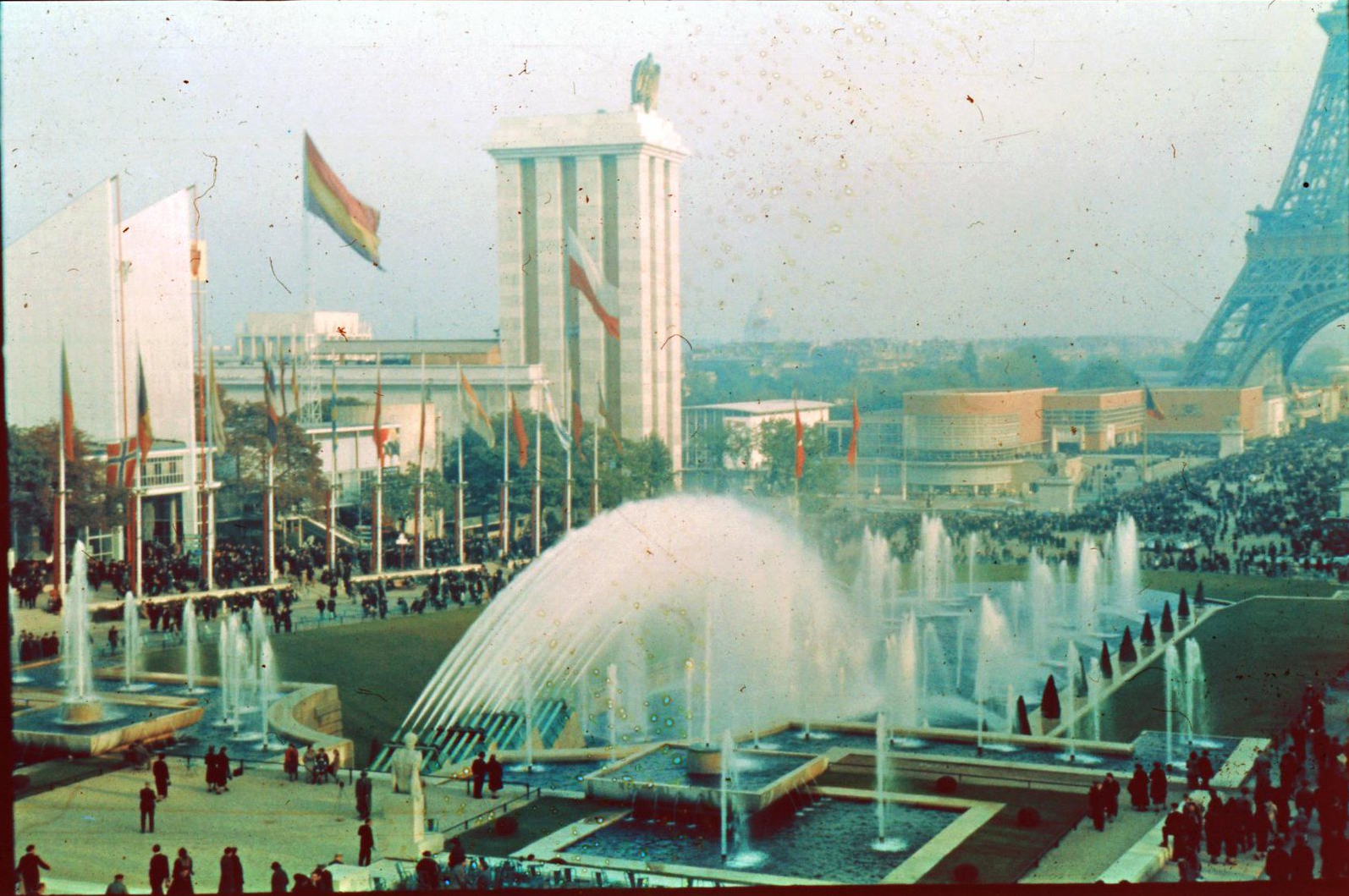
Pont d'Iéna at the Place de Varsovie in Paris (1937)

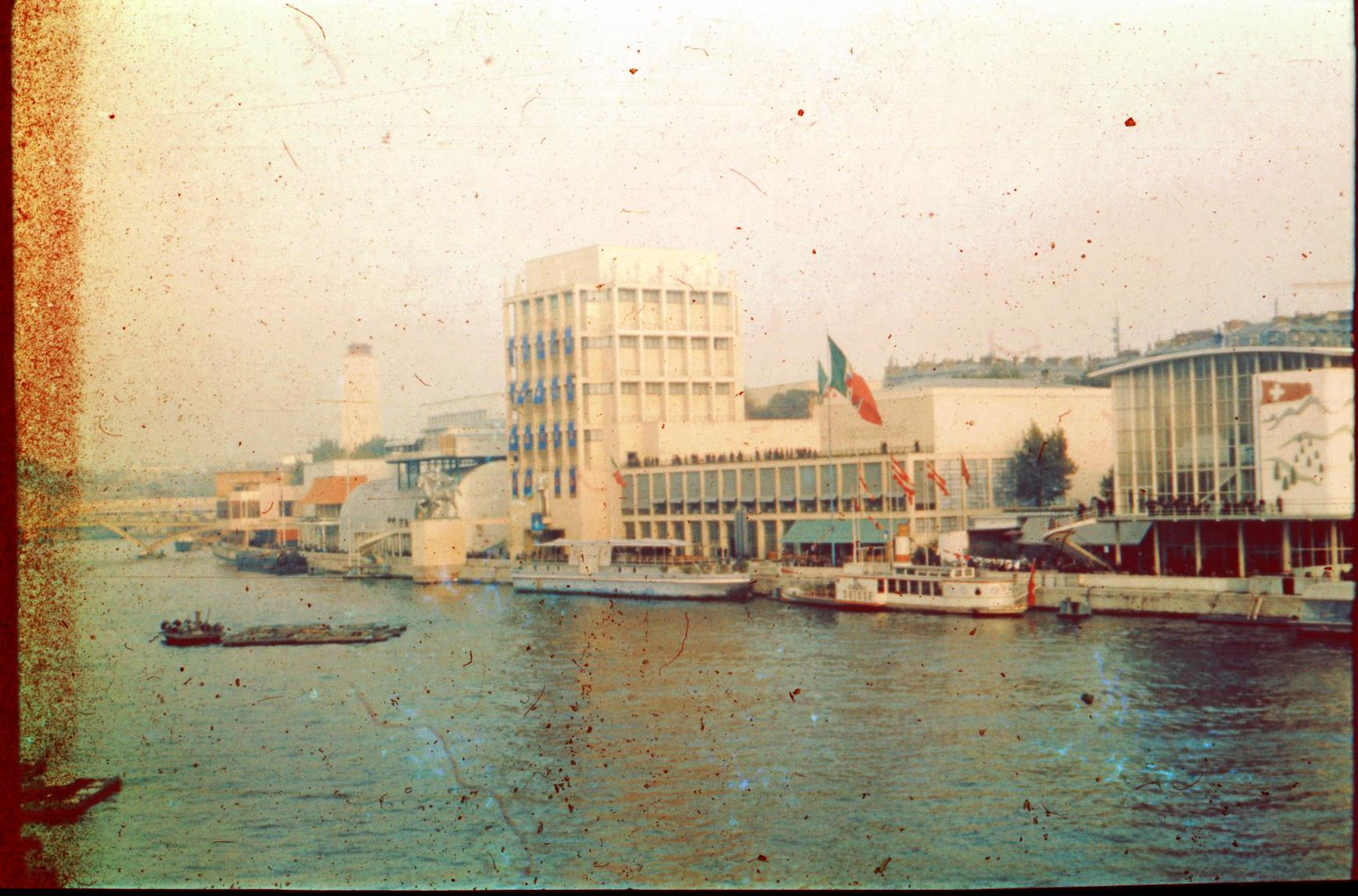
View from Pont d'Iéna in Paris (1937)

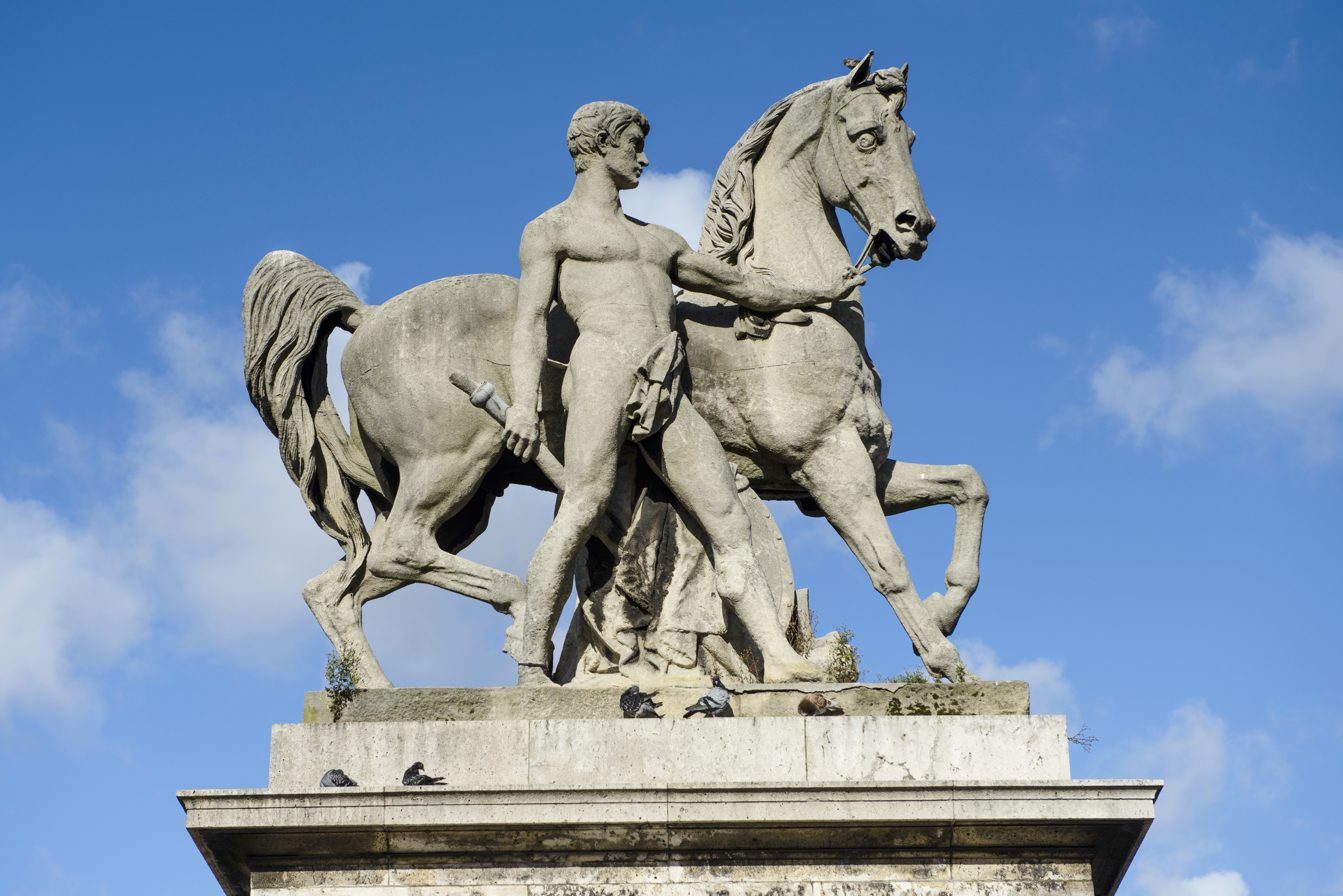
Roman warrior by Louis-Joseph Daumas

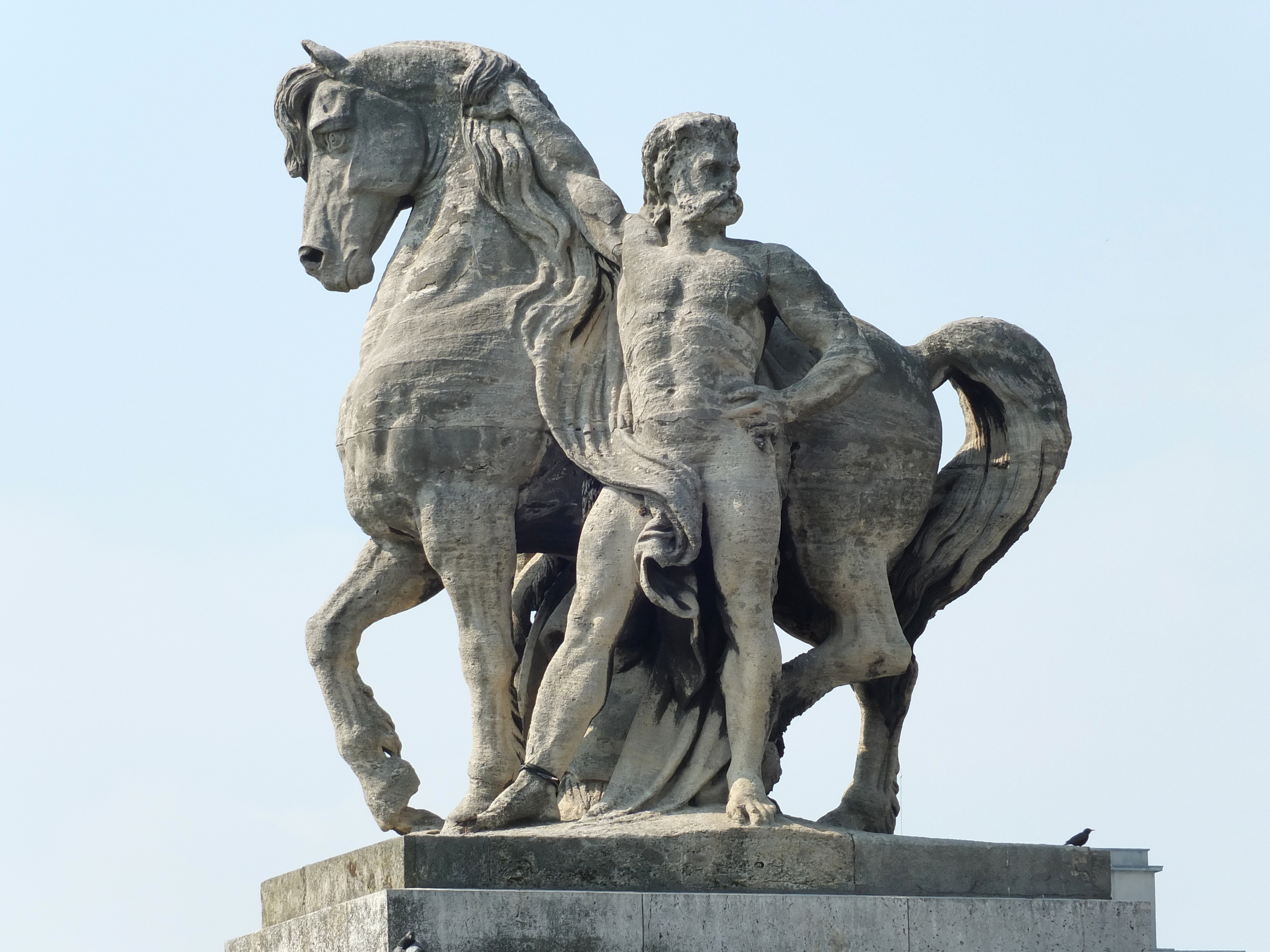
Gallic warrior by Antoine-Augustin Préault

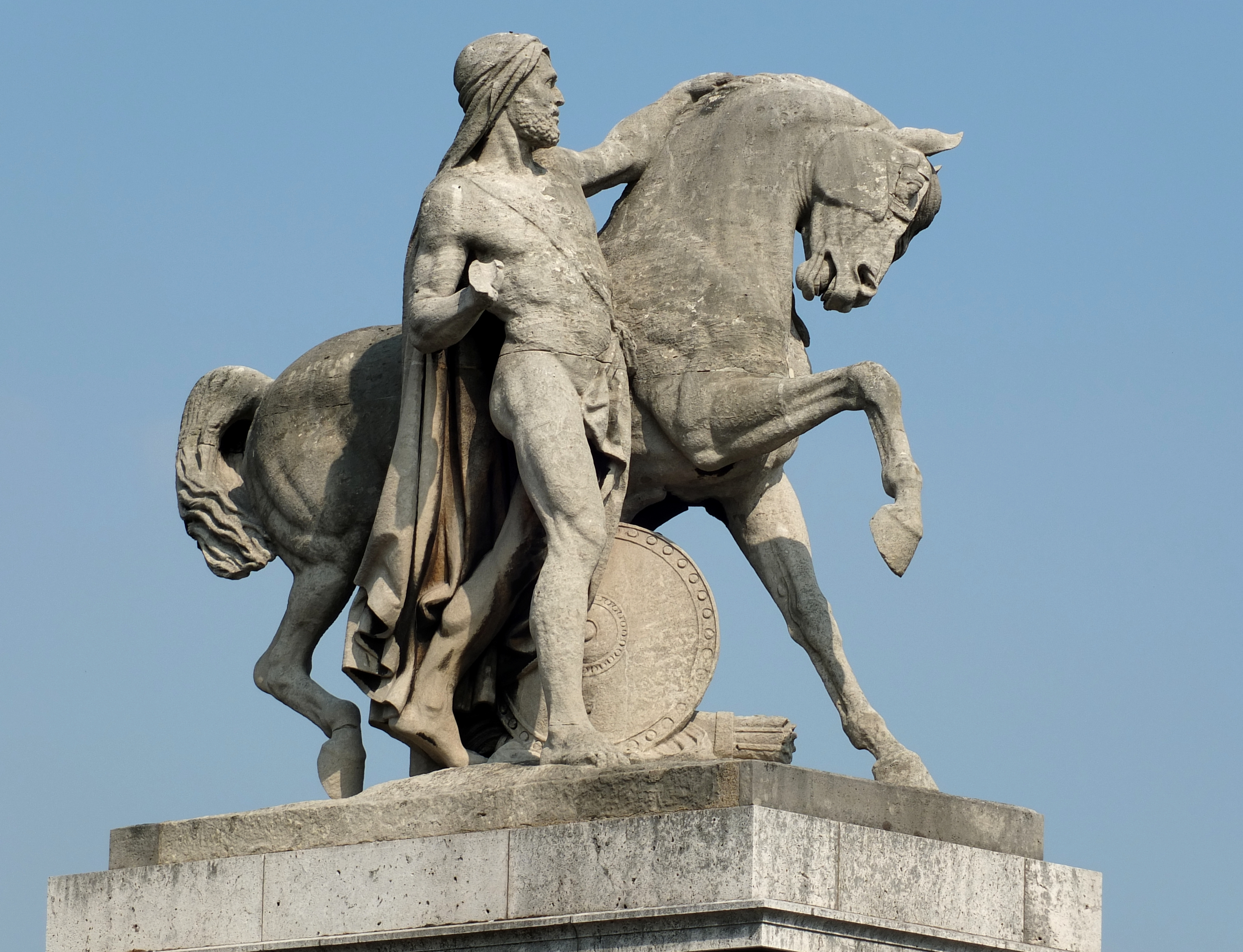
Arab warrior by Jean-Jacques Feuchère

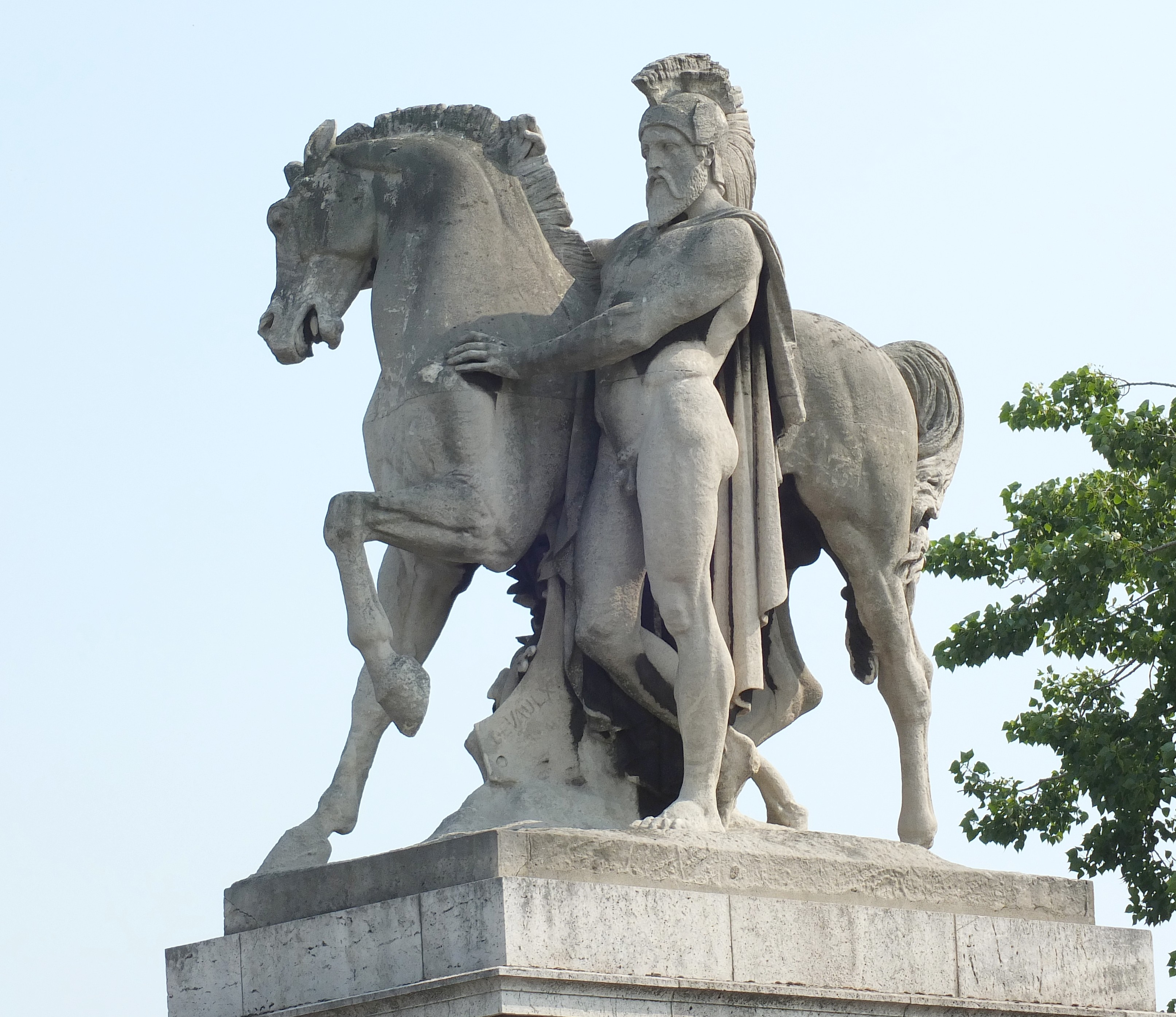
Greek warrior by François-Théodore Devaulx

== Access ==
Location on the Seine

The nearest metro station is Iéna, to the north east of the bridge, hence by foot heading south west via Avenue d'Iéna then Avenue des Nations-Unies.
