= Quartier de Saint-Thomas-d'Aquin =

Quarter of Paris, France

Coordinates: 48.856266021728516°N 2.3276379108428955°E

Saint-Thomas-d'Aquin
- Quartier de Saint-Thomas-d'Aquin
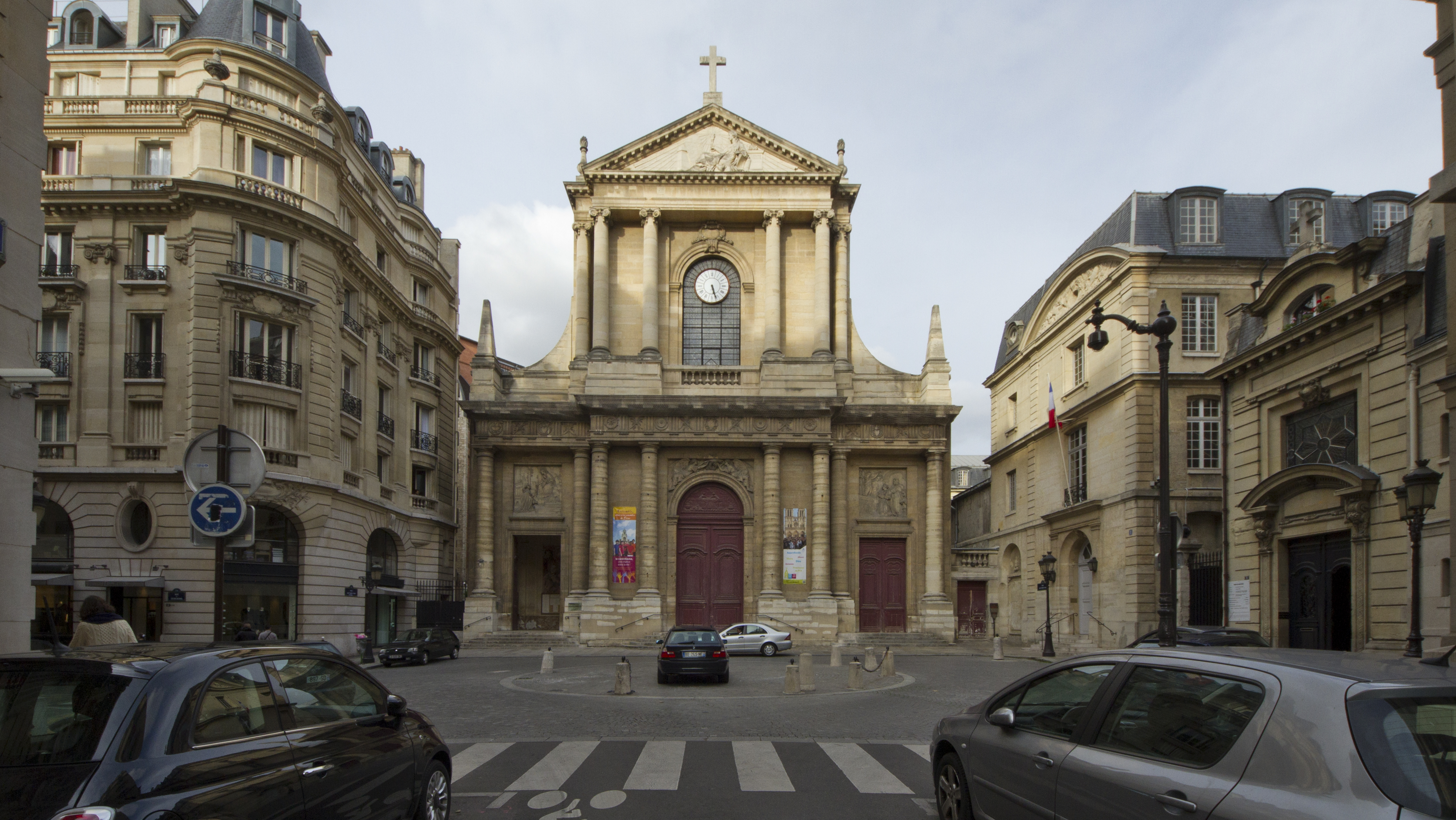
- Church of Saint-Thomas d'Aquin
- Interactive map of Saint-Thomas-d'Aquin
- Country: France
- Region: Île-de-France
- Ville: Paris
- Arrondissement: 7th

Area
  - Total: 0.827 km^{2} (0.319 sq mi)

Population (2016)
  - Total: 11,026
  - Density: 13,333/km^{2} (34,530/sq mi)

The Quartier de Saint-Thomas-d'Aquin is the 25th administrative district of Paris, located in the 7th arrondissement.

It is the most expensive district in Paris.

It is home to the Hôtel Matignon—the Prime Minister's official residence—as well as several government ministries (such as Ecology and Transport). Most ministries are located in the neighboring Quartier des Invalides.

== Situation ==
The district is bounded:

- to the west: Rue Vaneau, Rue de Bellechasse, Rue de la Légion-d'Honneur
- to the east: by a section of Rue de Sèvres, then Rue des Saints-Pères
- to the south: Rue Vaneau and Rue de Sèvres form a point
- to the north: along the Seine: Quai Anatole-France, Quai Voltaire
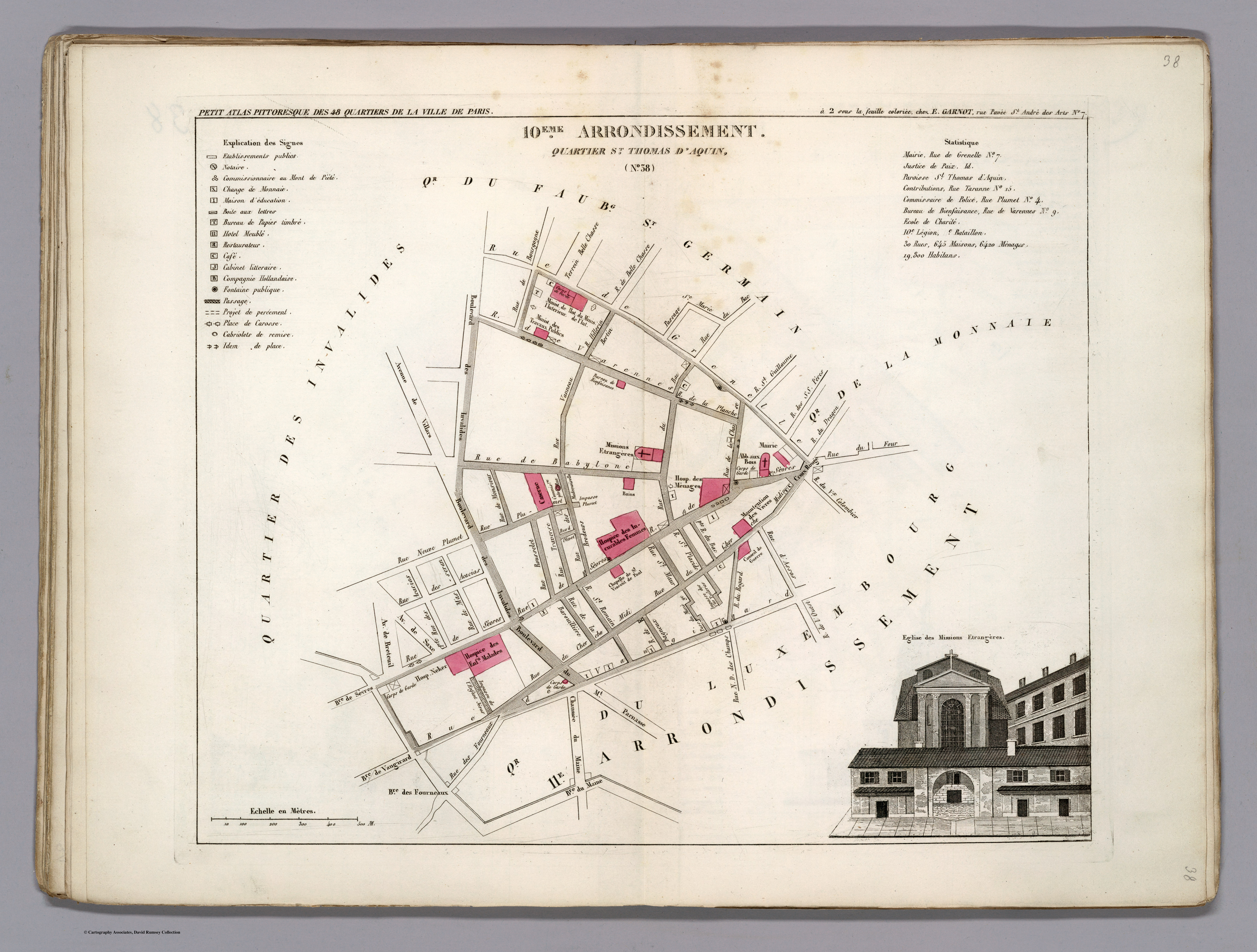
Map of the Saint-Thomas-d'Aquin neighborhood in the former 10th arrondissement in 1834.

The Quarters of the 7th arrondissement.

== Origin of the name ==
It is named in honor of the philosopher and theologian Thomas Aquinas (1225–1274).

== Notable buildings and sites of memory ==
- Church of Saint-Thomas-d'Aquin
- Chapel of Our Lady of the Miraculous Medal
- Chapel of the Epiphany
- Former Laennec Hospital
- Hôtel Matignon
- Le Bon Marché Department Store
- Musée d'Orsay
- Sciences Po
- Former building of the Institut national des langues et civilisations orientales (INALCO)
