= Jean-Jacques Feuchère =

French sculptor (1807-1852)

- Born: August 24, 1807
- Died: July 26, 1852 (aged 44)

Jean-Jacques Feuchère (French pronunciation: [ʒɑ̃ ʒak føʃɛʁ]; 24 August 1807 – 26 July 1852) was a French sculptor.

He was a student of Jean-Pierre Cortot, and among his students was Jacques-Léonard Maillet.

== Selected works ==
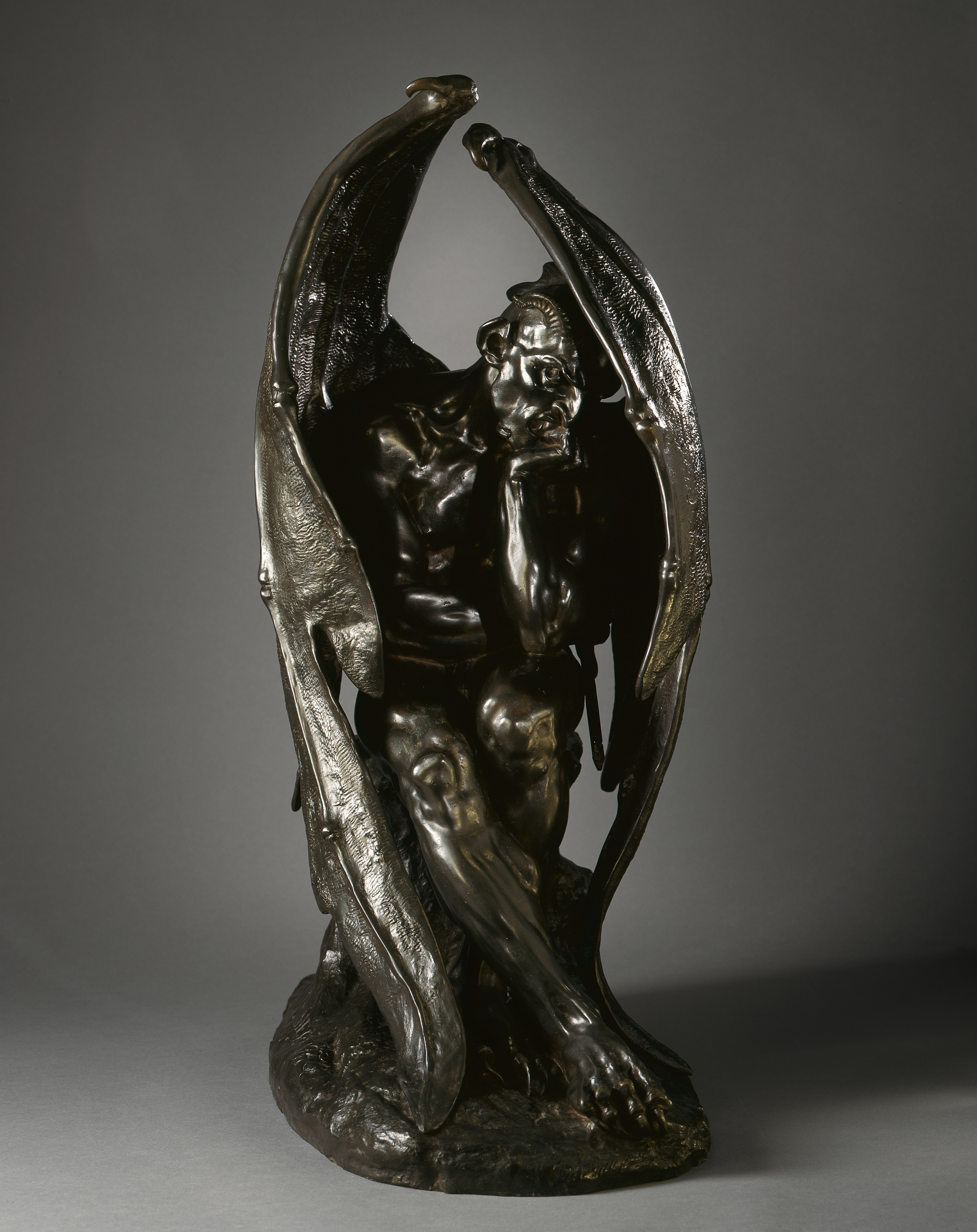
Satan, circa 1836, bronze, LACMA

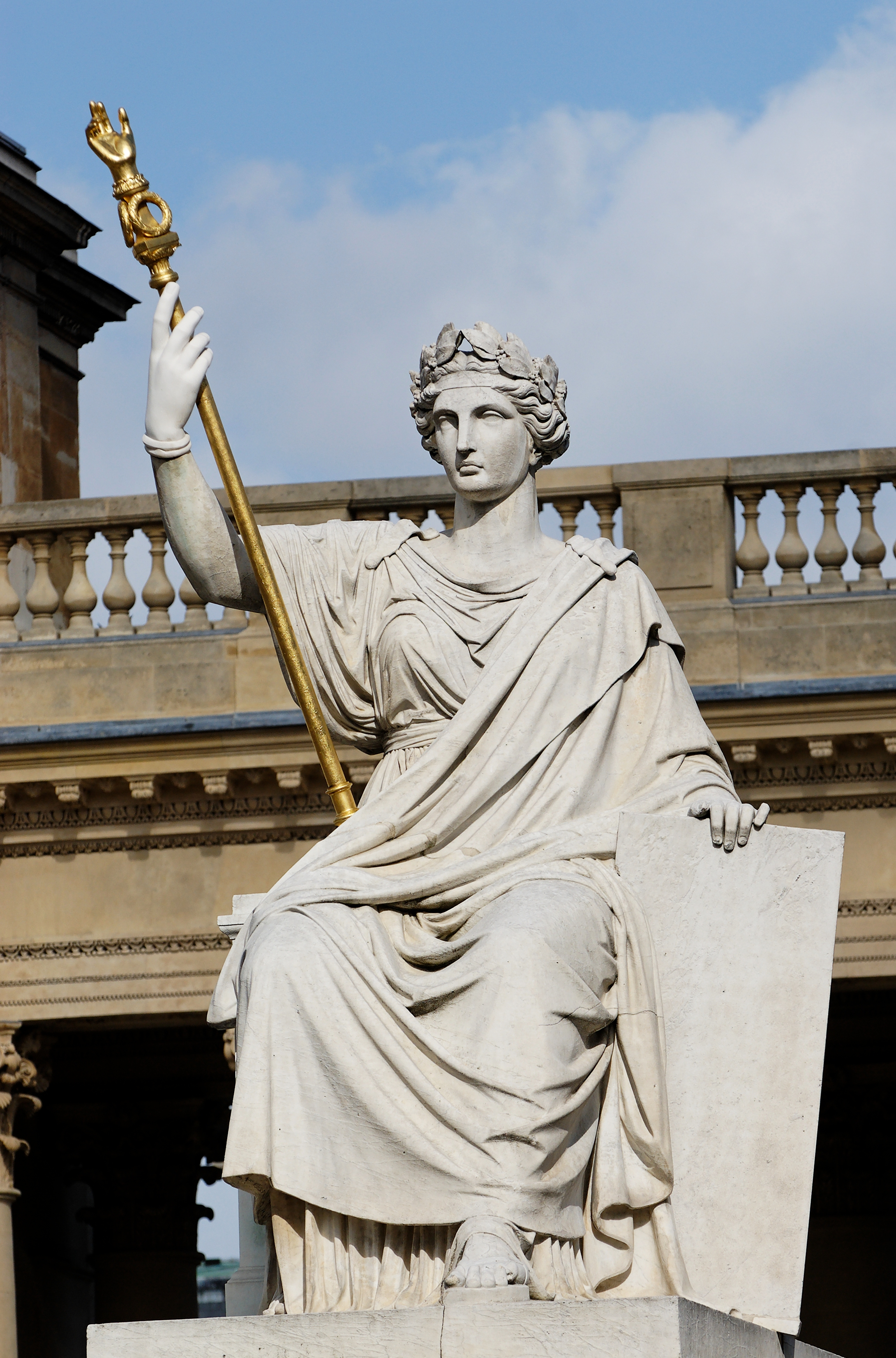
La Loi (The Law), 1854, Place du Palais-Bourbon, Paris

- Relief panel Le Pont d'Arcole, Arc de Triomphe, Paris, 1833–1834
- Satan, bronze; dated 1833 (Musée du Louvre). Other examples are in the collections of the Royal Museums of Fine Arts of Belgium, Asmolean Museum, and LACMA.
- Pediment sculpture, Church of St. Denys du Saint-Sacrement in Paris, 3rd arrondissement, for architect Étienne-Hippolyte Godde, 1835
- Portrait statue of the Marquis of Stafford, bronze 1837. (Dunrobin Castle)
- Amazon Taming a Horse, bronze; dated 1843. (Musée du Louvre); an undated bronze is at the Cleveland Museum of Art.
- La Loi (The Law), Place du Palais-Bourbon, Paris. Installed in 1854
- Arab Warrior on the Pont d'Iéna, Paris
- Fontaine Cuvier, rue Cuvier, Paris
- Seated Michelangelo, bronze
- Jeanne d'Arc, Hôtel de ville, Rouen
- La Madeleine, Paris
