= Place du Palais-Bourbon =

Public square in Paris, France

Coordinates: 48.8606°N 2.3183°E

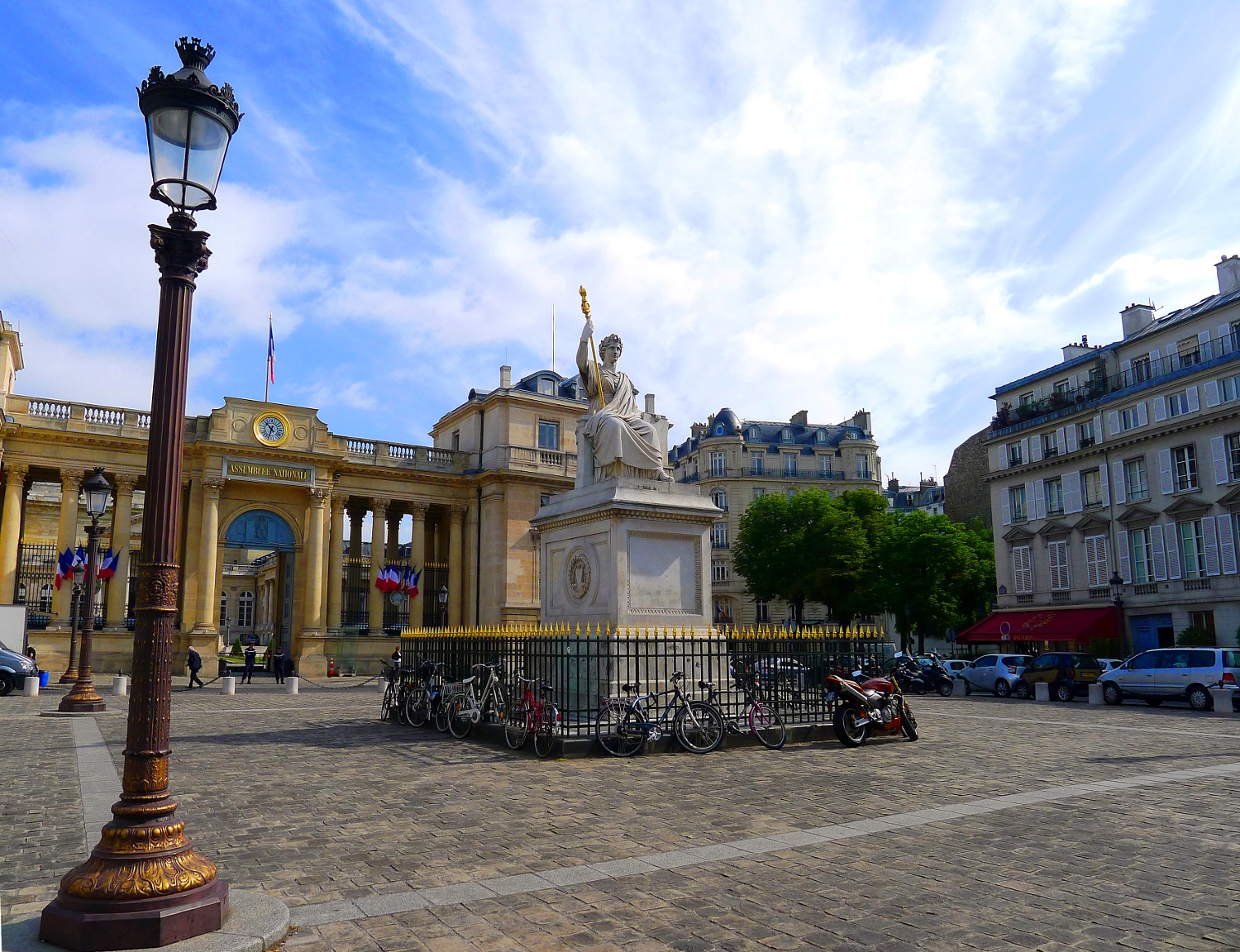
A view of La Loi on the Place du Palais-Bourbon with the Palais Bourbon in the background

The Place du Palais-Bourbon (French pronunciation: [plas dy palɛ buʁbɔ̃]) is a historic square in the 7th arrondissement of Paris, France. It is named after the Palais Bourbon, the seat of the National Assembly of the French Parliament, on the north side of the square.

== History ==
The land was acquired by Louis Joseph, Prince of Condé in 1769. The Prince de Condé hired architect Jean-François Leroy to design the square. Its construction, which began in 1788, was completed in 1804. In the meantime, the Prince of Condé had fled due to the French Revolution. In 1855, a statue named La Loi designed by sculptor Jean-Jacques Feuchère was installed at the centre of the square.
