= Paris during the Bourbon Restoration =

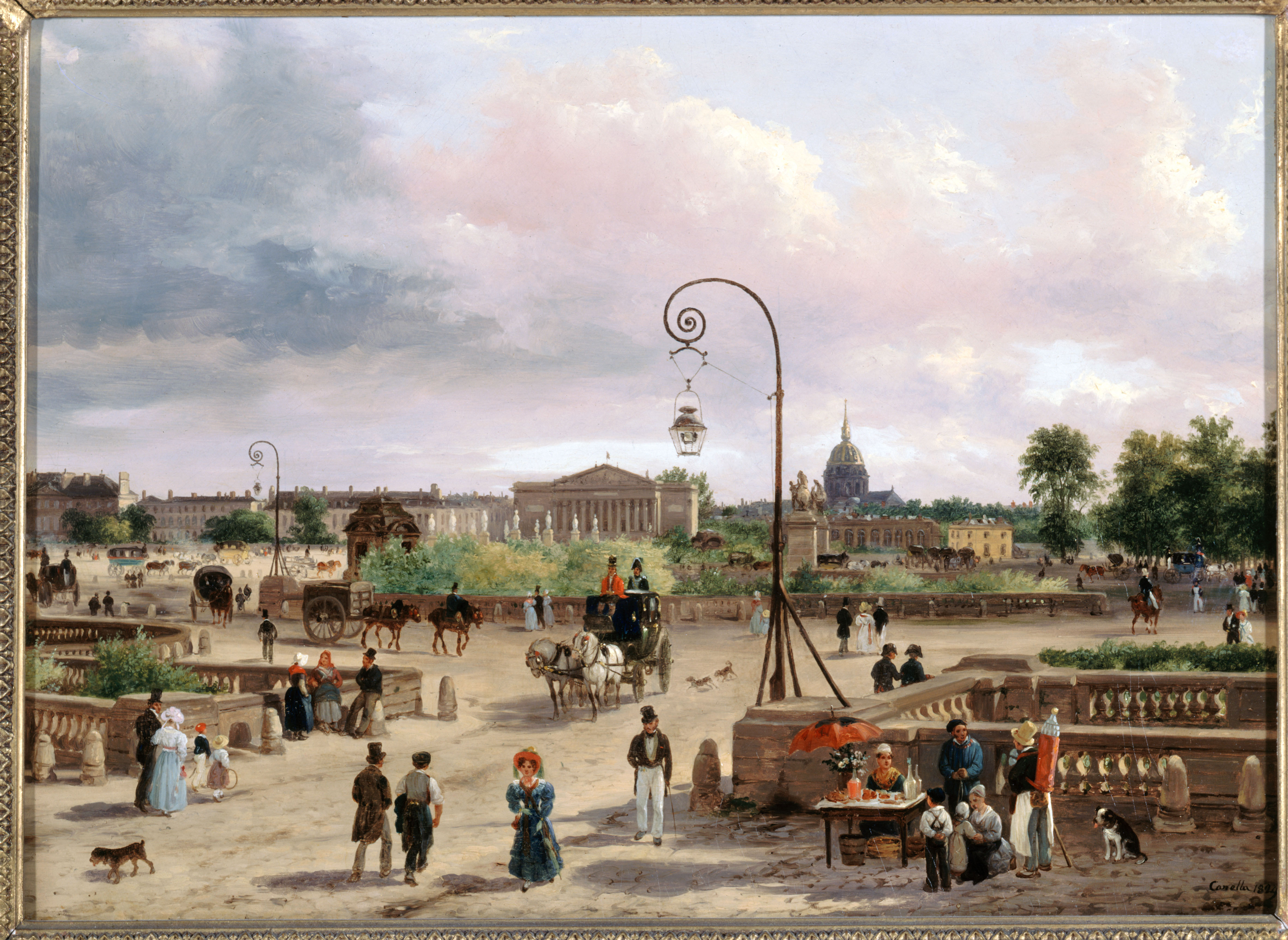
Place Louis XVI (1829), now Place de la Concorde

During the Restoration of the Bourbon monarchy (1815–1830) that followed the downfall of Napoleon, Paris was ruled by a royal government which tried to reverse many of the changes made to the city during the French Revolution. The city grew in population from 713,966 in 1817 to 785,866 in 1831. During this period, the Parisians saw the first public transport system, the first gas street lights, and the first uniformed Paris policemen. In July 1830 (July Revolution), a popular uprising in the streets of Paris brought down the Bourbon monarchy and began reign of a constitutional monarch, Louis-Philippe.

== Occupation, purges and unrest ==
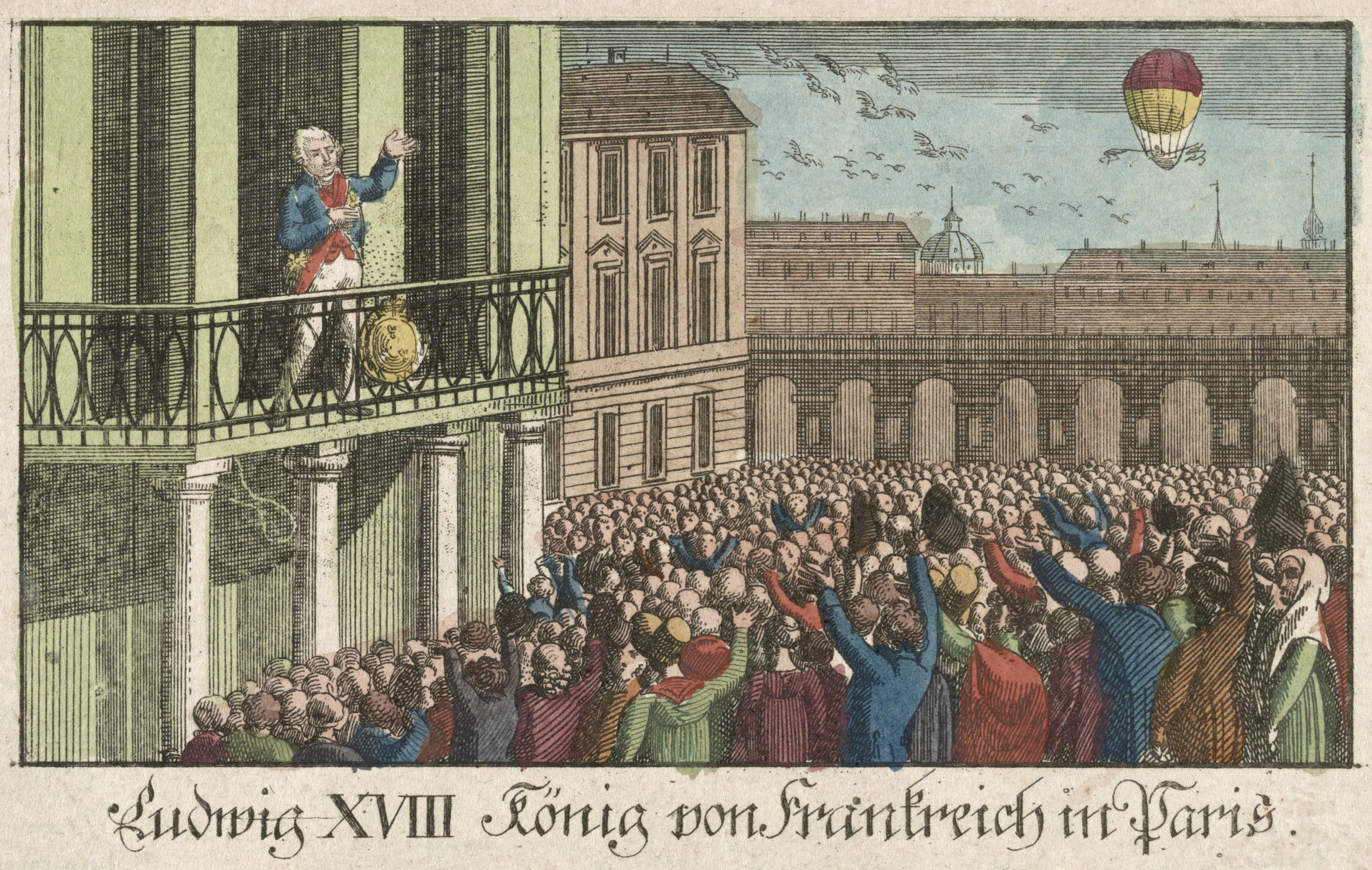
King Louis XVIII returns to Paris (3 May 1814)

Following the final defeat of Napoleon at the Battle of Waterloo in June 1815, an army of 300,000 soldiers from England, Austria, Russia and Germany occupied Paris, and remained until December 1815. They camped wherever there was open space; the Prussians settled on the Champs-de-Mars, around the Invalides, the Luxembourg Garden, and around the Carrousel of the Tuileries Palace. The British troops camped along the Champs-Elysées, while the Dutch troops and soldiers from Hannover settled in the Bois de Boulogne. The Russians moved into the barracks of the French Army around the city. The City of Paris was required to pay for the food and lodging of the occupiers; the bill was 42 million francs.

Louis XVIII returned to the city on 8 July 1815, and moved into the old rooms of Napoleon at the Tuileries Palace. He was greeted with songs and dances by the royalists of the city, but indifference or hostility by the rest of the Parisians. The pre-revolutionary names and institutions were quickly restored; The Pont de la Concorde became the Pont Louis XVI, a new statue of Henry IV was put back on the empty pedestal next to the Pont Neuf, and the white flag of the Bourbons flew from the top of the column in Place Vendôme.

In August 1815 a new legislative assembly was elected by a very strictly limited number of voters (only 952 in the arrondissement of the Seine), and was dominated by ultra-royalists. Under the new regime, citizens could be arrested and jailed by the government without trial. The government immediately began purging those associated with Napoleon's Empire. General Charles de la Bédoyère and Marshal Ney, who had fought for Napoleon, were executed by firing squad. The archbishop and bishops who had run the church in Paris under Napoleon were replaced by more conservative and royalist clerics. Those members of the Revolutionary convention who had voted for the execution of Louis XVI were exiled from France. Members of the Academies and Institute who had supported Napoleon were expelled, including the painter Jacques-Louis David, the mathematicians Lazare Carnot, Gaspard Monge, and the educator Joseph Lakanal. David went into exile in Belgium, and Lakanal went to the United States, where he was welcomed by President James Madison and became president of the University of Louisiana, now Tulane University.

Opposition to the royal regime was harshly repressed; in June and July 1816, members of a failed anti-regime conspiracy, called "the Patriots" were arrested and tried. The three leaders each had one hand cut off, the medieval punishment for those who killed their fathers, before being executed by the guillotine. The other seven members were put on public display attached to the pillory in front of the Palace of Justice.

During the Restoration, Paris did not have an elected government; it was ruled directly by the national government. New national elections for the legislature were held in 1816 and 1817, under strict rules; only men at least years old who paid direct taxes of at least 300 francs a year could vote. 9,677 Parisians were eligible to vote, and they voted largely for liberal candidates in opposition to the government, which was dominated by royalist and ultra-royalists. Three of the eight Paris deputies were prominent bankers: Jacques Laffitte, Benjamin Delessert and Casimir Perier.

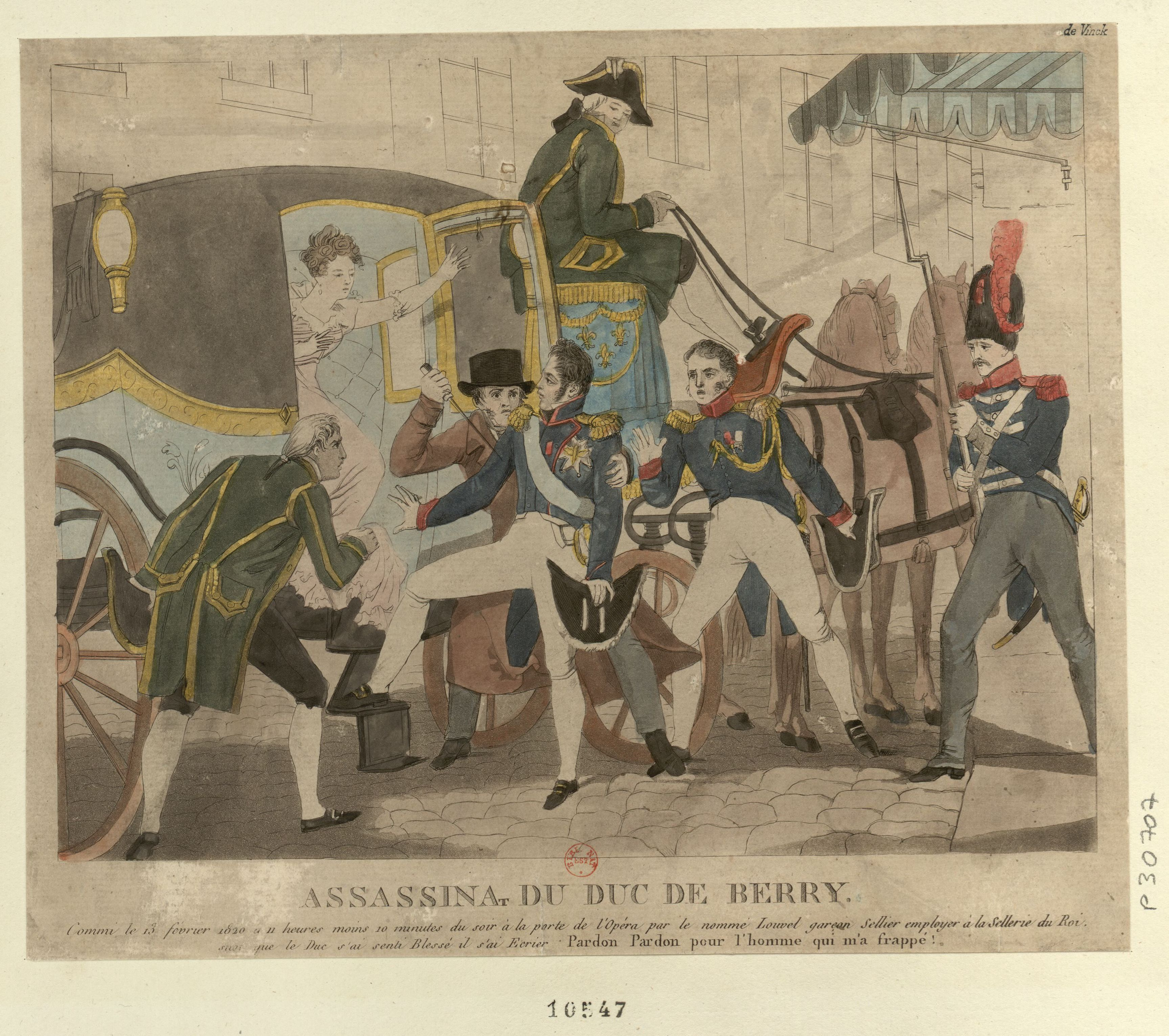
The assassination of the Duc de Berry outside the Opera (13 February 1820)

Parisians found many occasions to express their displeasure with the new government. In March 1817 theatre audiences cheered the actor Talma when he appeared on stage as a character resembling Napoleon; the play was banned. In July 1818, the students of the Ecole polytechnique were confined to the school to prevent them from attending the funeral of the mathematician Monge. In July 1819, students in the Latin quarter rioted against the dismissal of a liberal professor from the law school of the University of Paris. A more serious incident took place on 13 February 1820; the assassination of the Duke de Berry, the nephew of the King, and the only hope of the dynasty for providing a male heir to the throne. His murder led to even more serious repressive measures by the government. But on 18 November 1822, students protested again against the very conservative rector of Academy of Paris, the Abbé Nicolle, who had no scientific or medical background.

The government had a brief period of popularity in 1823 when a French military expedition to Spain succeeded in restoring another deposed monarch, Ferdinand VII, to the Spanish throne in Madrid. The French army defeated the Spanish revolutionaries at the battle of Trocadero, which gave its name to a new Paris square. King Louis XVIII died on 16 September 1824, and was replaced by his brother, Charles X. The king's Coronation in Reims in May 1825 was celebrated with major festivities in Paris. The new King surrounded himself with ultra-conservative ministers, and opposition continued to grow, particularly in Paris, until the French Revolution of 1830.

The aristocrats who had emigrated returned to their town houses in the Faubourg Saint-Germain, and the cultural life of the city quickly resumed, though on a less extravagant scale. A new opera house was constructed on rue le Peletier. The Louvre was expanded in 1827 with nine new galleries, putting on display the antiquities collected during Napoleon's conquest of Egypt.

== The Parisians ==
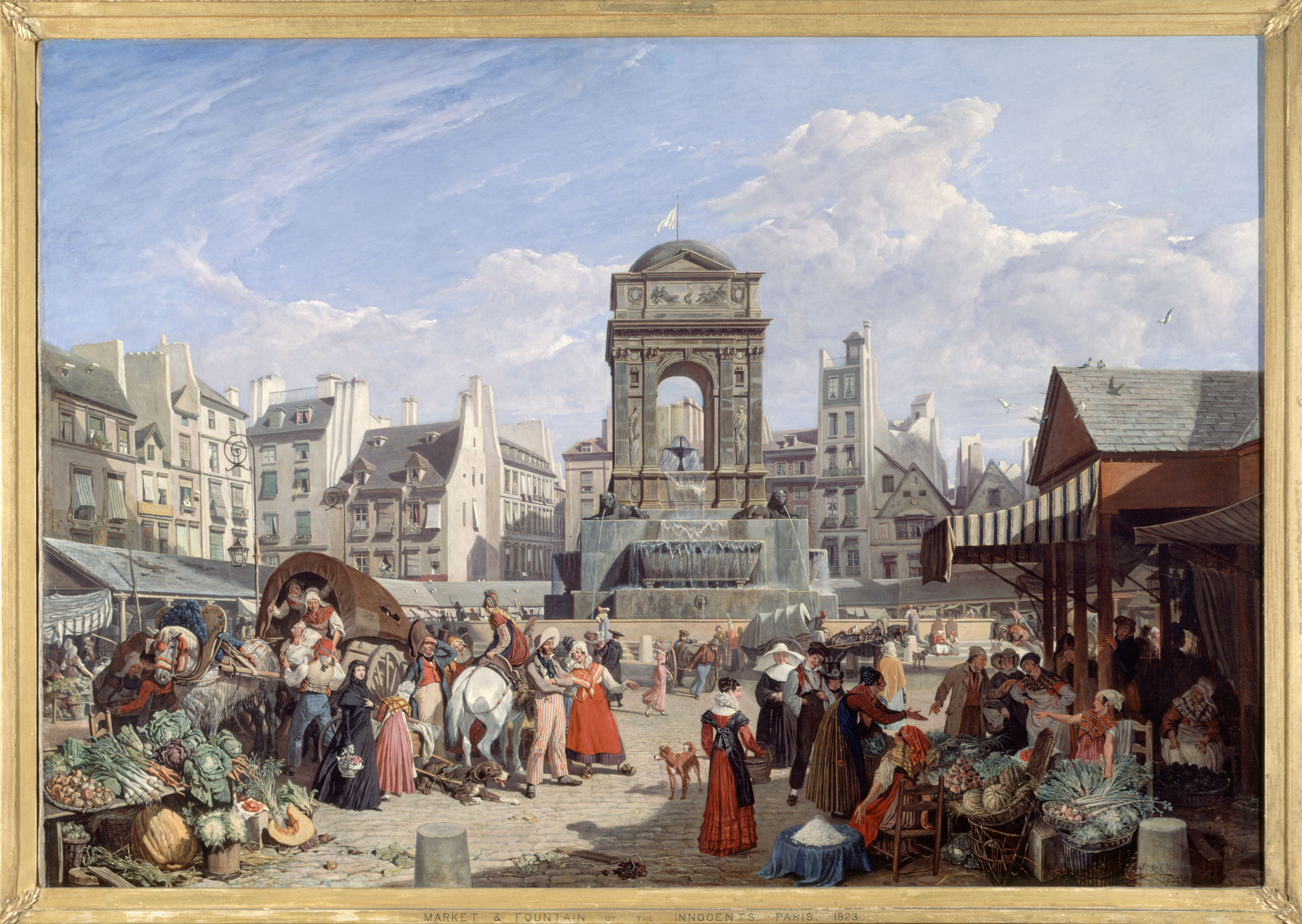
Market of the Saint-Innocents (1822)

According to the official census, the population of Paris grew from 713,966 in 1817, shortly after the Restoration of the monarchy, to 785,866 in 1831, shortly after its end. Most of the new Parisians were immigrants from the nearby French regions, seeking work as the city's economy recovered from the long years of war under Napoleon. At the top of the social structure of Paris was the nobility, led by the King and his court. Both Louis XVIII and Charles X lived in the Tuileries Palace, and used the Chateau of Saint-Cloud as their main secondary residence. The ancient and decayed Tuileries was not a comfortable residence; it had no basement or sewers, and the lack of modern plumbing made it foul-smelling; one noblewoman, the Countess of Boigne, reported that "one is almost suffocated climbing the staircases of the Pavillon de Flore and crossing the corridors of the second floor." The Kings did not carry on the elaborate social protocols and festivities of their predecessors; both had lived many years in exile, and they were used to a simpler life. The formal and grand ceremony of the King's waking up and going to bed was replaced by a simple ceremony each evening at nine clock, when the King gave the order of the day to the commander and captains of the King's guards. The King had to live within a household budget, fixed at the beginning of each year; twenty five million livres for Louis XVIII and twenty million for Charles X.

High society, composed of two to three hundred families of the old aristocracy, government officials, army officers and high clergy, was also much less glittering than it had been at Versailles under the old regime; it was led by the Duchess of Angoulême, the daughter of Louis XVI, who always dressed in black and detested anything modern. Society met in weekly "cercles" on the first floor of the Tuileries, or in the salons of the magnificent townhouses in the Faubourg Saint-Germain and Faubourg Saint Honoré. Their income came mostly from their estates or from the State Treasury, from the various official positions they held, but their salaries were less generous than under the Old Regime.

Just below high society, and growing in status and influence, were the bankers, including Casimir Perier, the Rothschilds, Benjamin Delessert and Hippolyte Ganneron, and new industrialists, including François Cavé, Charles-Victor Beslay, Jean-Pierre Darcey, and Jean-Antoine Chaptal. Unable to become part of the aristocracy, many were elected to the Chamber of Deputies and advocated liberal economic policies and democratic principles, which eventually brought them into growing conflict with the royal government. While the aristocrats lived on the left bank in the Faubourg Saint-Germain, most of the newly wealthy chose to live on the right bank, often in new neighborhoods that were constructed during the Restoration; the Chaussée-d'Antin was the home of the bankers Rothschilds, Laffitte; Casimir Perier's hôtel was on the rue Neuvre du Luxembourg (now the rue Cambon); Delessert lived on rue Montmartre, Ganneron on rue Bleu in the faubourg Montmartre; Beslay and Cavé on rue Faubourg Saint-Denis and rue Neuve-Popincourt.

Below them was a growing middle class of merchants, lawyers, accountants, government clerks, teachers, doctors, shopkeepers, and skilled artisans.

The largest number of Parisians were working class, either artisans in small enterprises, domestic servants, or workers in the new factories. They also included a large number of women, many of them working at home in the clothing industry, sewing and embroidering or other manual labor.

== The Administration of the city and the police ==
While the King quickly replaced the symbols of Napoleon's reign, he kept most of Napoleon's city administration; he kept Napoleon's efficient chief of the city government, the prefect of the Seine, Chabrol de Volvic, and also kept Napoleon's president of the General Council of the Seine, Bellart. As under Napoleon, there were no municipal elections and no elected city government; all were chosen by the national government.

On March 29, 1829, near the end of the Restoration, the government created the corps of Sergeants de Ville, the first uniformed police force of the city. They wore long blue coats with buttons decorated with the coat of arms of the city. During the day, they were armed only with a cane with a white handle. At night, they carried a saber. Most were former sergeants of the army; when the corps was created, it numbered just one hundred men.

One of the weaknesses of the city administration, which in the Revolution of 1830 proved fatal to the royal government, was the small number of police to maintain order. Aside from those in administrative jobs, the police on the streets numbered only two to three hundred men. In 1818, of the three hundred police posts around the city, fifty-seven were manned by the national guard, sixteen by gendarmes, and seven by firemen, a total of one thousand nine hundred men. The national guard of thirty-two thousand men was composed of the middle class; most were not wealthy enough to vote and were hostile to the government. Within the city, the King depended upon the fifteen hundred gendarmes and the army garrison of fifteen thousand men, most of whom deserted his cause in July 1830.

== Monuments and architecture ==
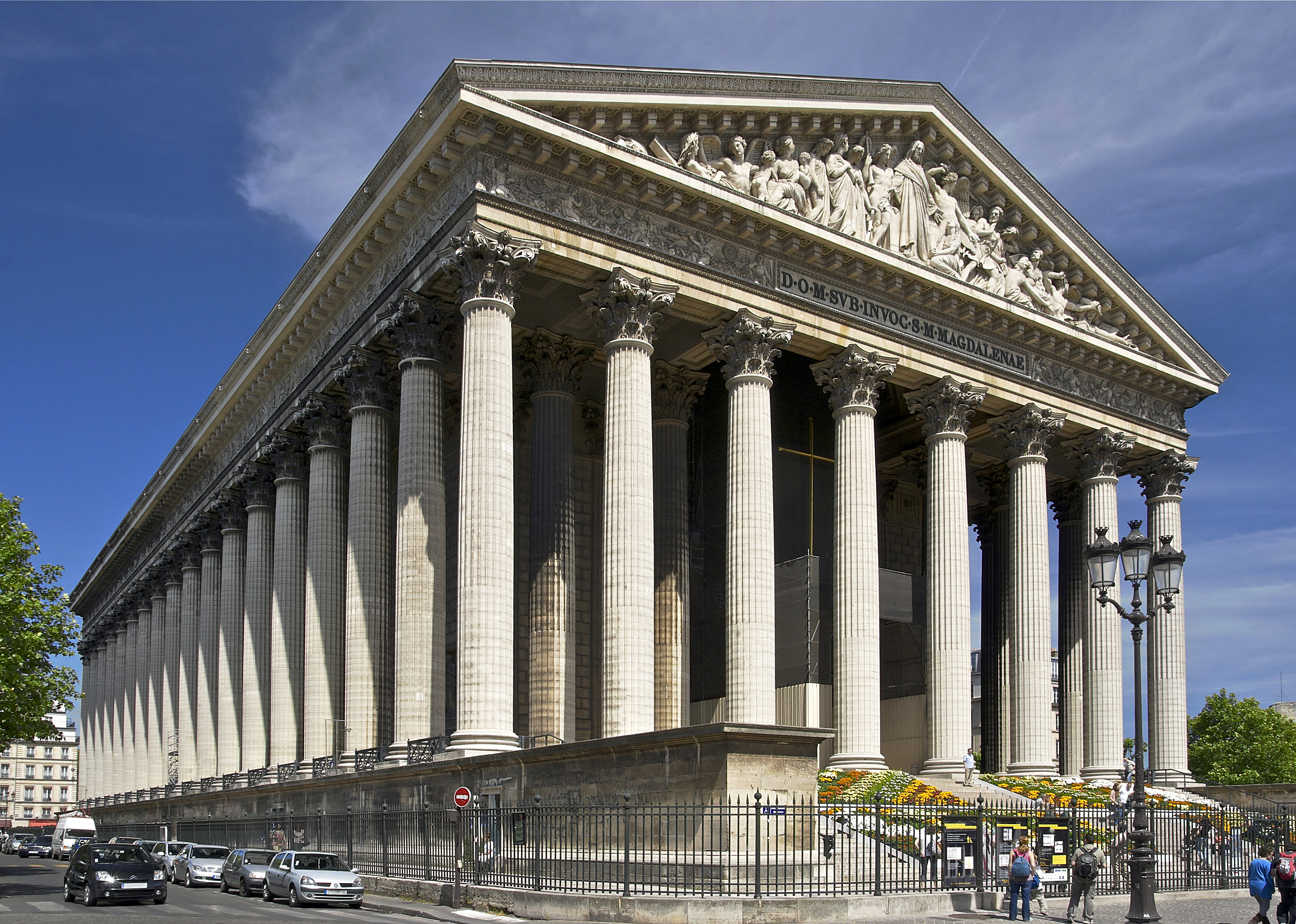
The church of La Madeleine (1763-1842)

The royal government restored the symbols of the old regime, but continued the construction of most of the monuments and urban projects begun by Napoleon. All of the public buildings and churches of the Restoration were built in a relentlessly neoclassical style. The Canal Saint-Martin was finished in 1822, and the building of the Bourse de Paris, or stock market, designed and begun by Alexandre-Théodore Brongniart from 1808 to 1813, was modified and completed by Éloi Labarre in 1826. New storehouses for grain near the Arsenal, new slaughterhouses, and new markets were finished. Three new suspension bridges were built over the Seine; the Pont d'Archeveché, the Pont des Invalides and footbridge of the Grève. All three were rebuilt later in the century. The damage caused by the occupation armies in the Bois de Boulogne, on the Champ-de-Mars was repaired; the trees and gardens were replanted.

The Temple of Glory (1807), first designed as a church and then transformed by Napoleon into a temple to celebrate military heroes, was turned back into a church, the Royal church of La Madeleine. King Louis XVIII also built the Chapelle expiatoire or expiatory chapel (1826) devoted to Louis XVI and Marie-Antoinette, on the site of the small cemetery of the Madeleine, where their remains (now in the Basilica of Saint-Denis) were buried following their execution. New churches in the neoclassical style were begun to replace those destroyed during the Revolution; Saint-Pierre-du-Gros-Caillou (1822–1830); Notre-Dame-de-Lorette (1823–1836); Notre-Dame de Bonne-Nouvelle (1828–1830); Church of Saint-Vincent-de-Paul (1824–1844) and Saint-Denis-du-Saint-Sacrement (1826–1835).

Work also resumed, slowly, on the unfinished Arc de Triomphe, begun by Napoleon. At the end of the reign of Louis XVIII, the government decided to transform it from a monument to the victories of Napoleon into a monument celebrating the victory of the Duke of Angôuleme over the Spanish revolutionaries who had overthrown their Bourbon king. A new inscription was planned: "To the Army of the Pyrenees" but the inscription had not been carved and the work was still not finished when the regime was toppled in 1830.

Paris architecture during the Restoration

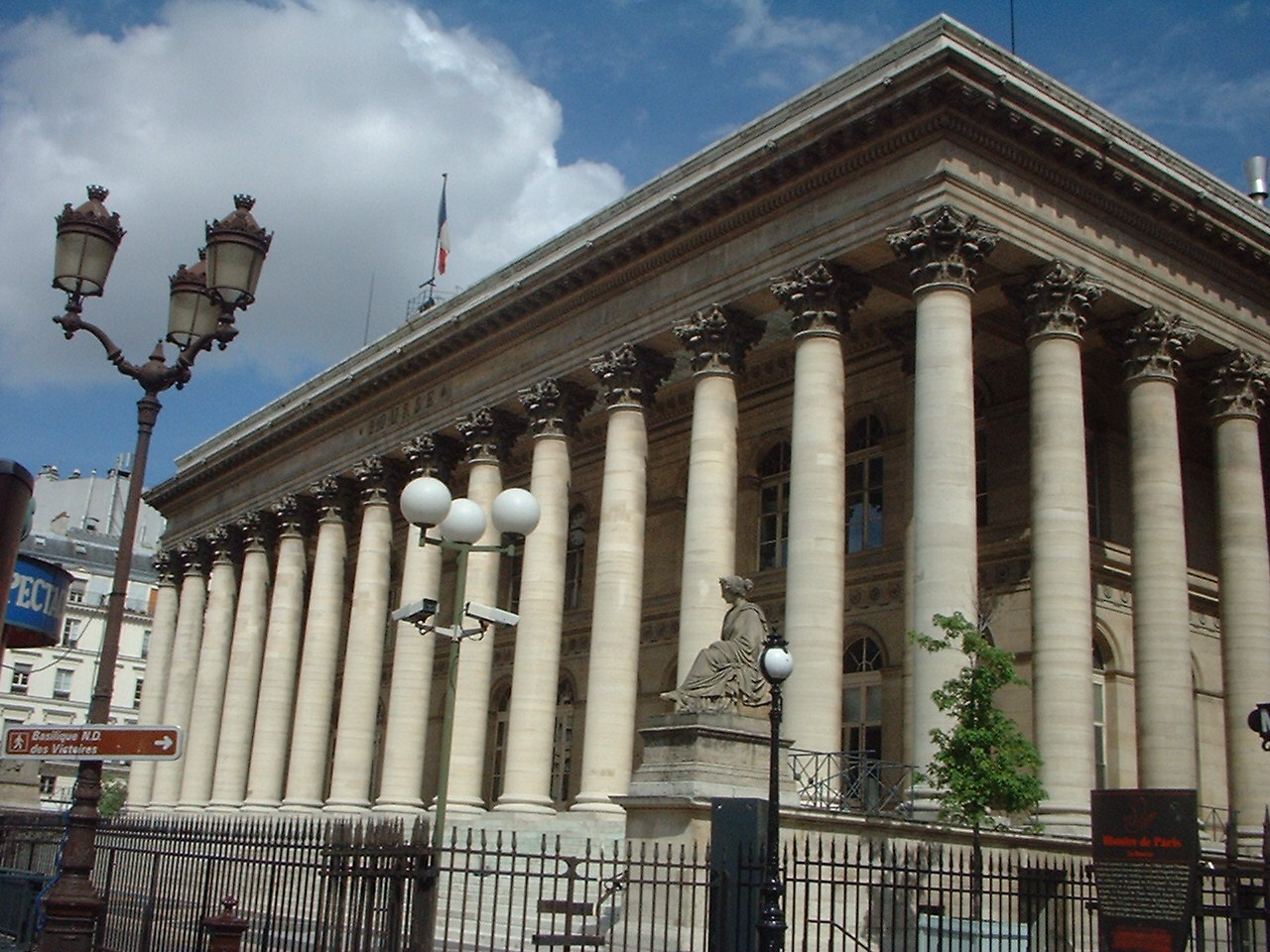
The Bourse de Paris, or stock market (1808-1826)

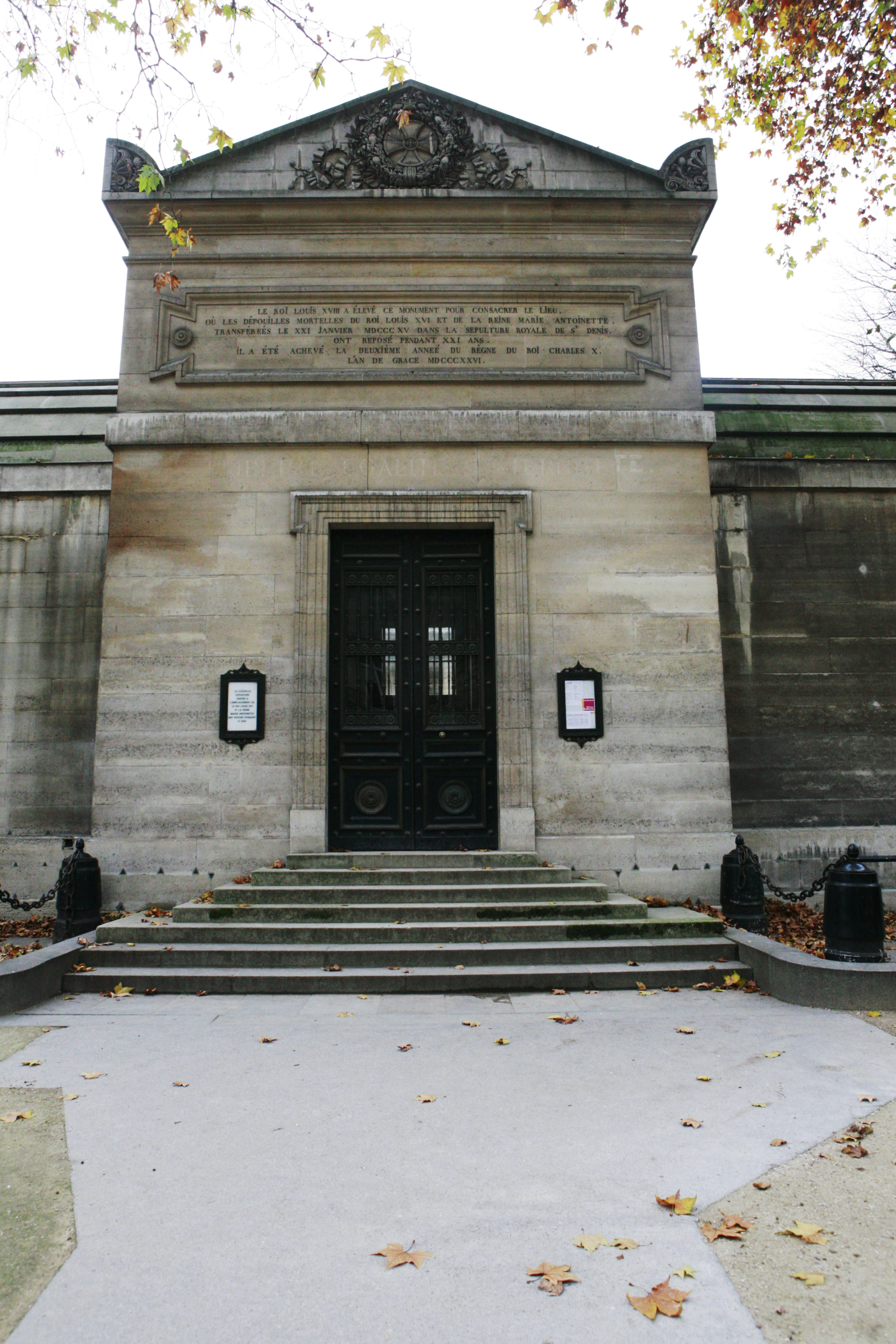
The Chapelle expiatoire (1826)

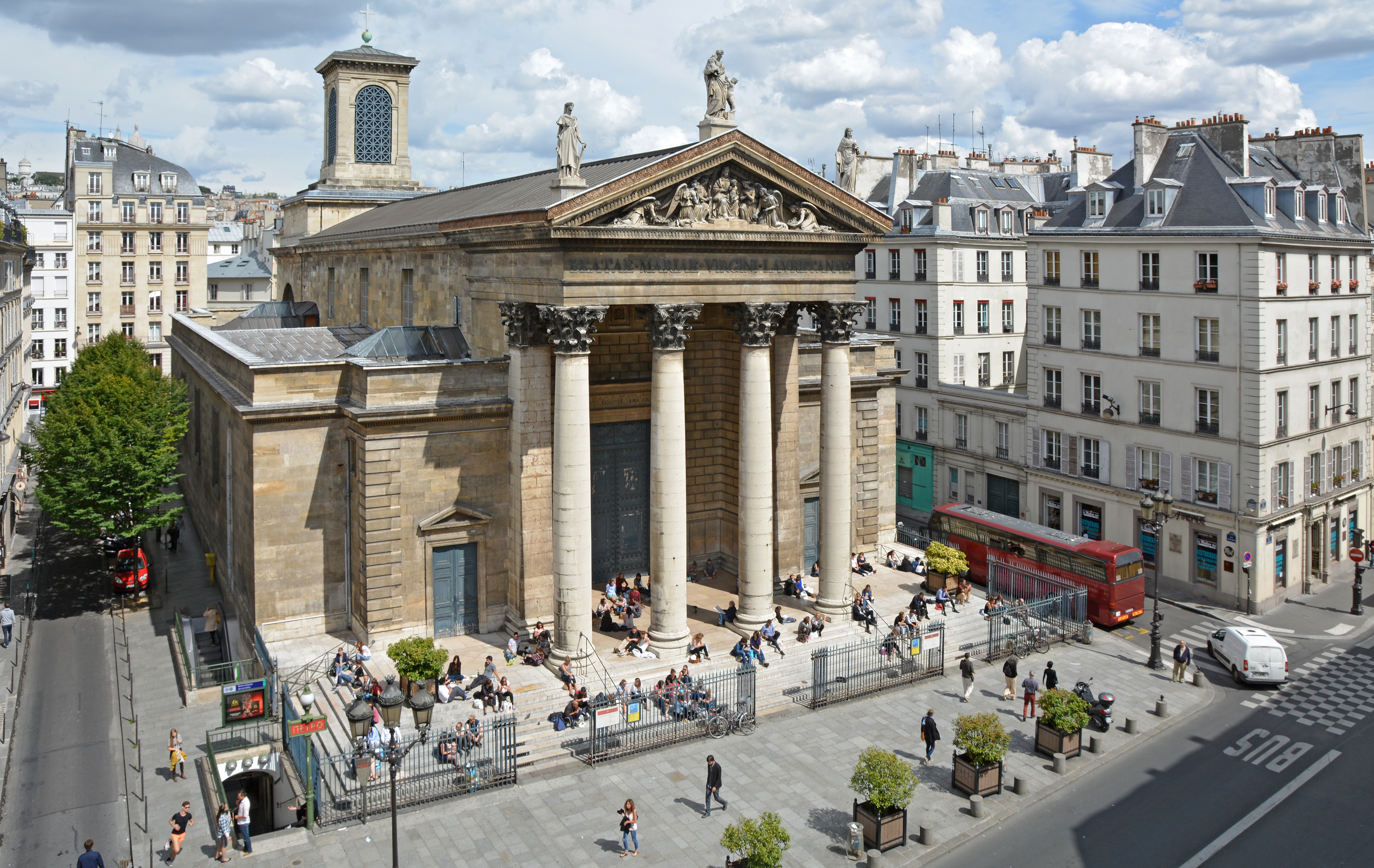
The church of Notre-Dame-de-Lorette (1823–1836);

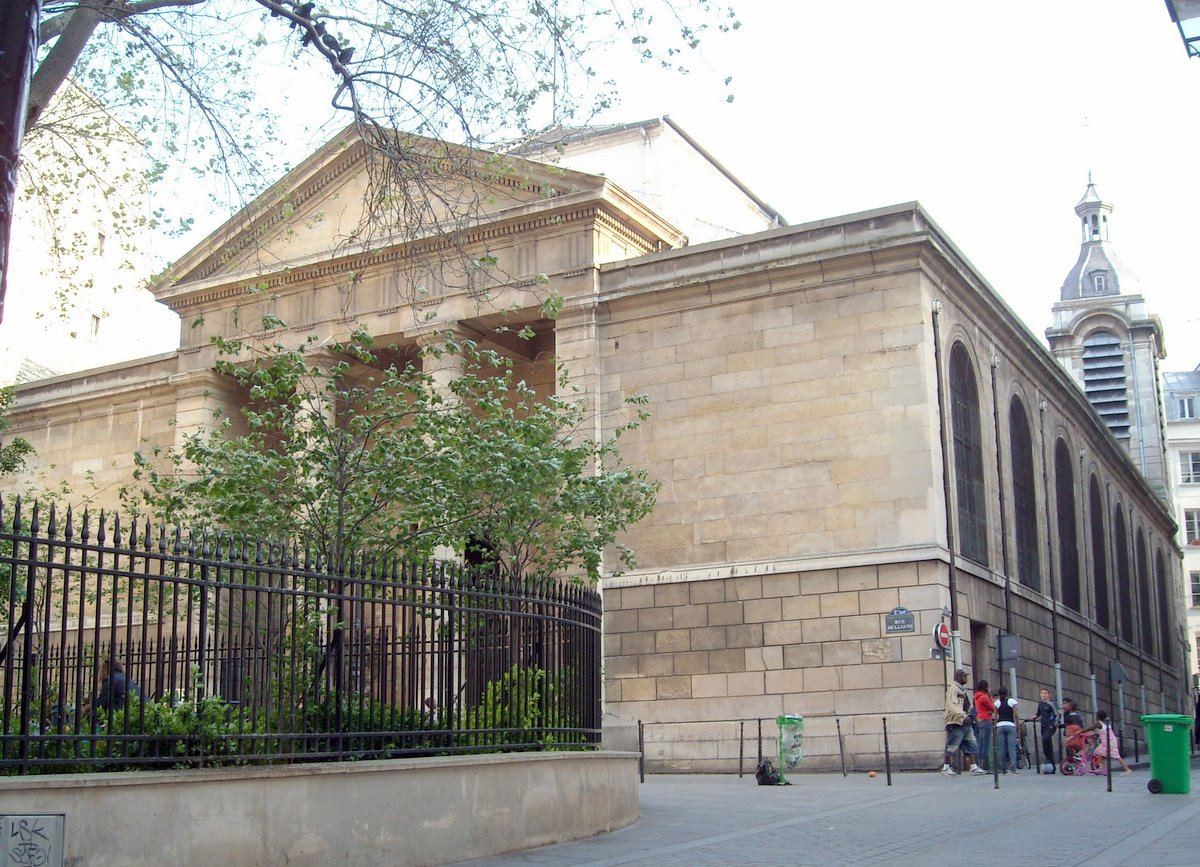
The church of Notre-Dame de Bonne-Nouvelle (1828–1830)

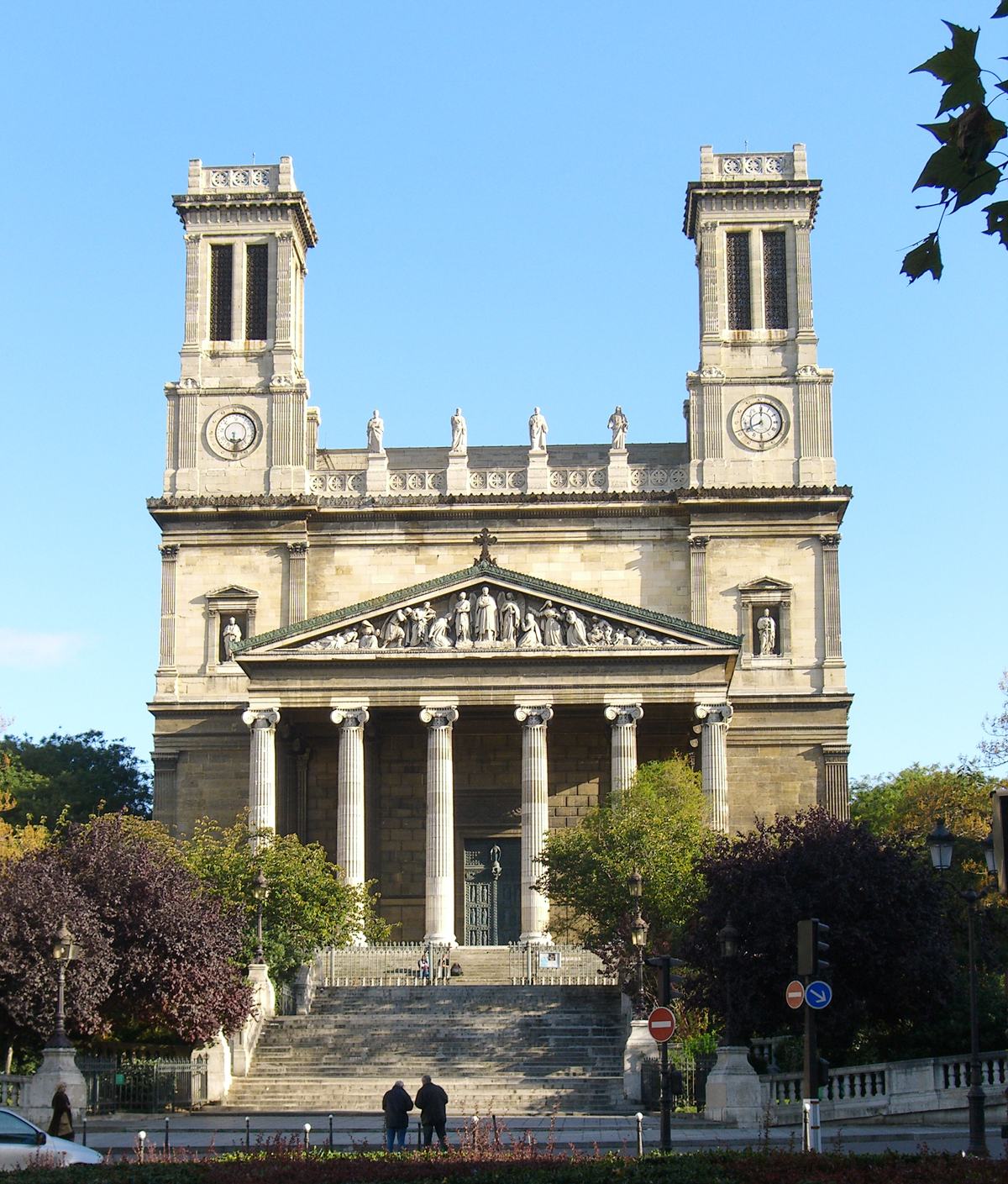
Church of Saint-Vincent-de-Paul (1824-1844)

== The City grows ==
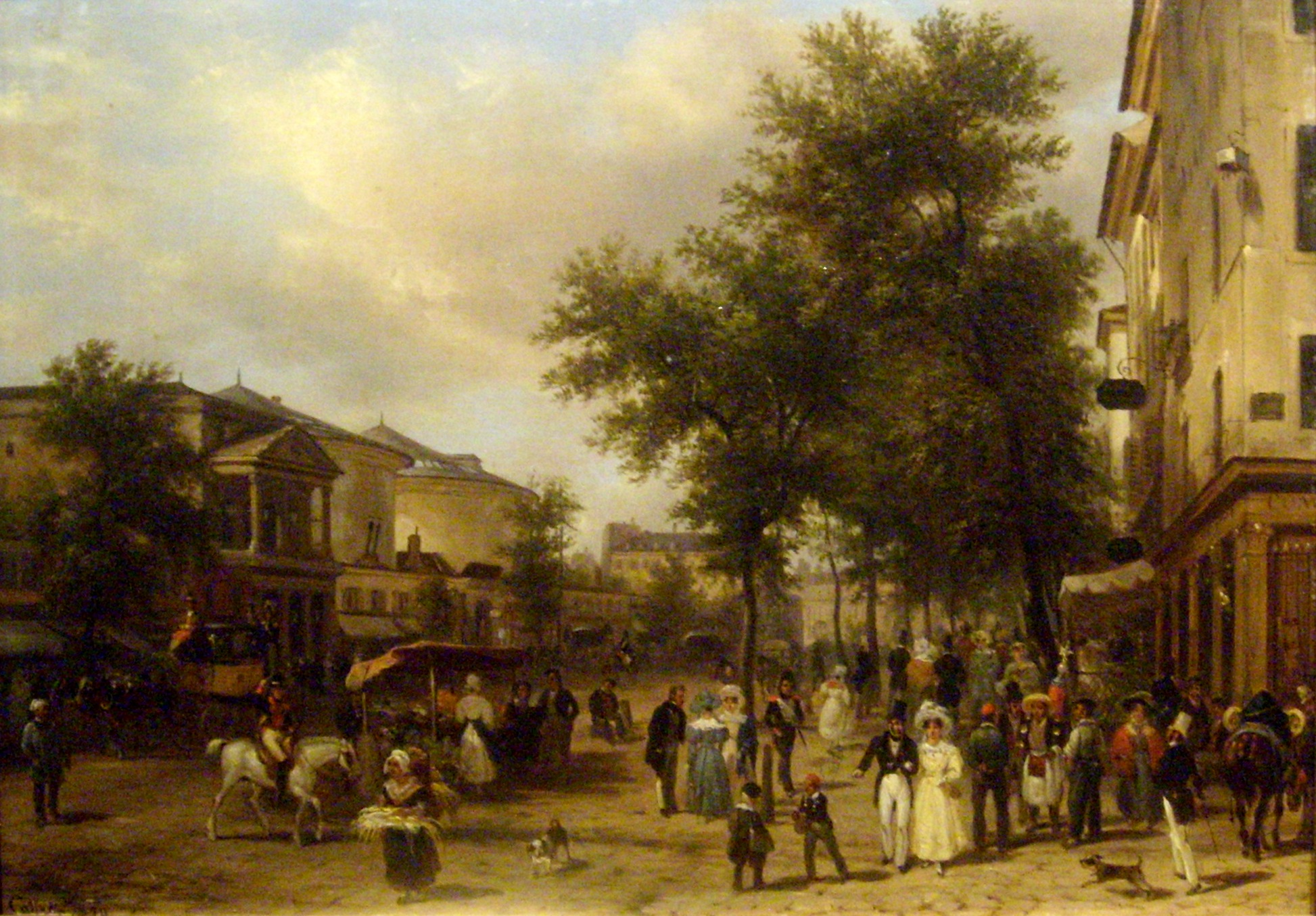
Boulevard Montmartre, by Guisepe Canella (1830)

The city expanded, especially to the north and west, funded by the city's energetic new bankers. Beginning in 1822, the bank of Laffitte funded a new neighborhood, the quarter Poissonniere, including a new street, called rue Charles-X until 1830, now rue La Fayette. Another real estate developer named Dosne created the rue Notre-Dame-de-Lorette and the Saint-Georges quarter. In 1827, the city spread toward the northwest; the Enclos Saint-Lazare was divided into lots, and thirteen new streets laid out. In 1829, the rue Vivienne was extended. Beginning in 1826, a large new neighborhood, the Quartier de l'Europe, was developed between the old wall of the Farmer's General, the rue Saint-Lazare, parc Monceau and rue de Clichy. The new streets in the neighborhood were named after the capitals of Europe of the time, including Naples, Turin and Parma. A new boulevard, Malesherbes, was begun and surrounded with side streets and building sites. Beginning in 1823, another entrepreneur laid out fashionable new residential neighborhood to the west, between the allee des Veuves, the Champs-Élysées and the Cours-la-Reine. It was called the quartier Francois-Premier.

The city soon had to enlarge its borders, In 1817, the village of Austerlitz, on the site of the modern train station of that name, was annexed to Paris, bringing with it the hospital of La Saltpétriére. In 1823, a consortium of investors started a new community on the plain of Grenelle, around a brand-new village called Beaugrenelle. Within five years the new neighborhood had a main street, rue Saint-Charles, a church and a population. Another new town was launched outside the city at les Batignolles, an area of scattered farms and gardens. By 1829 it had a church and a population of five thousand persons, and was joined the villages of Monceau and Montmartre.

== Industry and commerce ==
During the Restoration, Paris became the cradle of the Industrial Revolution in France. The textile industry had already been installed in the faubourg Saint-Antoine by the firm of Richard and Lenoir, and by Albert in the Faubourg Saint-Denis. In 1812, Benjamin Delessert had built the first refinery of sugar beets at Passy, which became one of the largest industrial enterprises in the Paris region. In 1818, he joined forces with Baron Jean-Conrad Hottinguer to create the Caisse d'Epargne et de Prévoyance de Paris, France's first savings bank. French scientists made important advances in new technologies, including the manufacture of rubber, aluminum, and gilded products, which were turned into industries. Even before the Revolution, in 1779 the Count of Artois, the brother of the King, had built the first chemical plant on the plain of Javel, next to the Seine, making sulfuric acid, potash, and chlorine, called "Eau de Javel." The plant also made hydrogen gas, used in the first manned balloon flights, and varnish, used to seal the fabric of balloons. During the Restoration, inspired by the work of the chemist Jean-Antoine Chaptal and other scientists, new factories were built along the left bank of the Seine, making a wide variety of new chemical products, but also heavily polluting the river.

The model Paris industrialist during the Restoration was William-Louis Ternaux, who dominated the French woolen industry. He owned four woolen mils in France and Belgium, had workshops on Rue Mouffetard in Paris designing and making new textile machines, and owned ten retail stores in Paris selling his products. He had his own ship and his own bank, on Place des Victoires, and in all employed a total of twenty thousand workers. He was an innovator; he helped introduce the merino sheep into France, and in 1818-1819 brought the first cashmere goats from Tibet to France, and made the first French luxury cashmere wool shawls. He promoted annual expositions of the products of Paris industry, and was elected three times to the National Assembly. In the late 1820s, however, his business began to decline, faced with competition from less expensive English wool and cotton clothing.

=== Luxury goods and the ancestor of the department store ===
The commerce in luxury goods had suffered greatly during the Revolution, as the chief buyers, the aristocracy, had been driven into exile. Their return during the Restoration and especially the rapid growth of the number of wealthy Parisians revived the business in jewelry, furniture, fine clothing, watches and other luxury products. The finest shops of Paris were lined up along the Rue Saint-Honoré. The most prominent fashion designer was LeRoy, whose clients included the Duchess of Angloulème and other aristocrats. At the beginning of the Restoration he removed the stone carving of the bees, the emblem of Napoleon, from the facade of his shop, and replaced them with the fleur-des-lys, the emblem of the Bourbons.

in October 1824 a merchant named Pierre Parissot opened a store called La Belle Jardiniére, which offered a variety of women's clothing already made in different sizes, at a time when women traditionally had each dress made to their measurements, as well as jewelry, lingerie, and fabrics. The new kind of retail store was made possible by another innovation, the omnibus, which allowed customers to come to the store distant neighborhoods, instead of shopping only in their own neighborhood. It was soon followed by two similar stores, Aux Trois Quartiers (1829) and Le Petit Saint Thomas (1830). These are considered by historians the ancestor of the modern department stores, which appeared in Paris the 1840s and 1850s. Another retail innovation took place in December 1824, when the store la Fille d'honneur at 26 rue de la Monnaie became to first store in France to put price tags on items.

=== The Passage des Panoramas ===
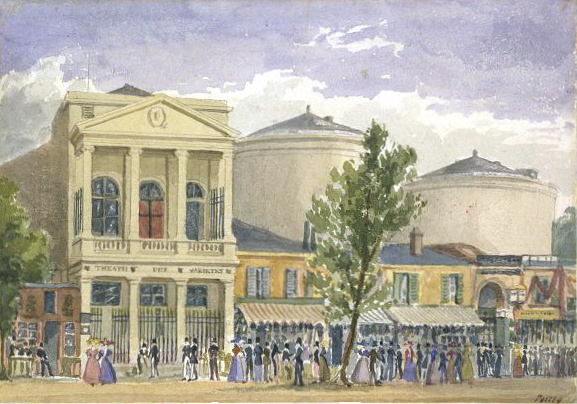
The Théâtre des Variétés and the Panoramas (1829)

The Passage des Panoramas, opened at the very end of the 18th century, was a model for the new Parisian covered shopping street, where shoppers did not have to contend with the rain, lack of sidewalks, or traffic on the narrow streets. At the entrance of the Passage on boulevard Montmartre was a café called Véron, next to a candy shop called A la duchesse de Courtlande which sold not only bonbons but also fresh peaches, cherries and grapes, even in winter. Next door was a paper shop, Susse, with business cards and fine writing paper; then the shop of a famous modiste, Mademoiselle Lapostolle, whose speciality was straw hats. There were pastry shops, chocolate shops, shops selling coffee and tea, music, counters for changing foreign currency, and many other speciality shops, and the panoramas themselves, large-scale realistic paintings of Paris, Toulon, Amsterdam, Naples, and other cities, to be viewed for a small price. Unlike the dark streets outside, the Passage was brightly lit by gas lights, one of the first places in Paris so equipped.

== Daily life ==
=== The streets and neighborhoods ===
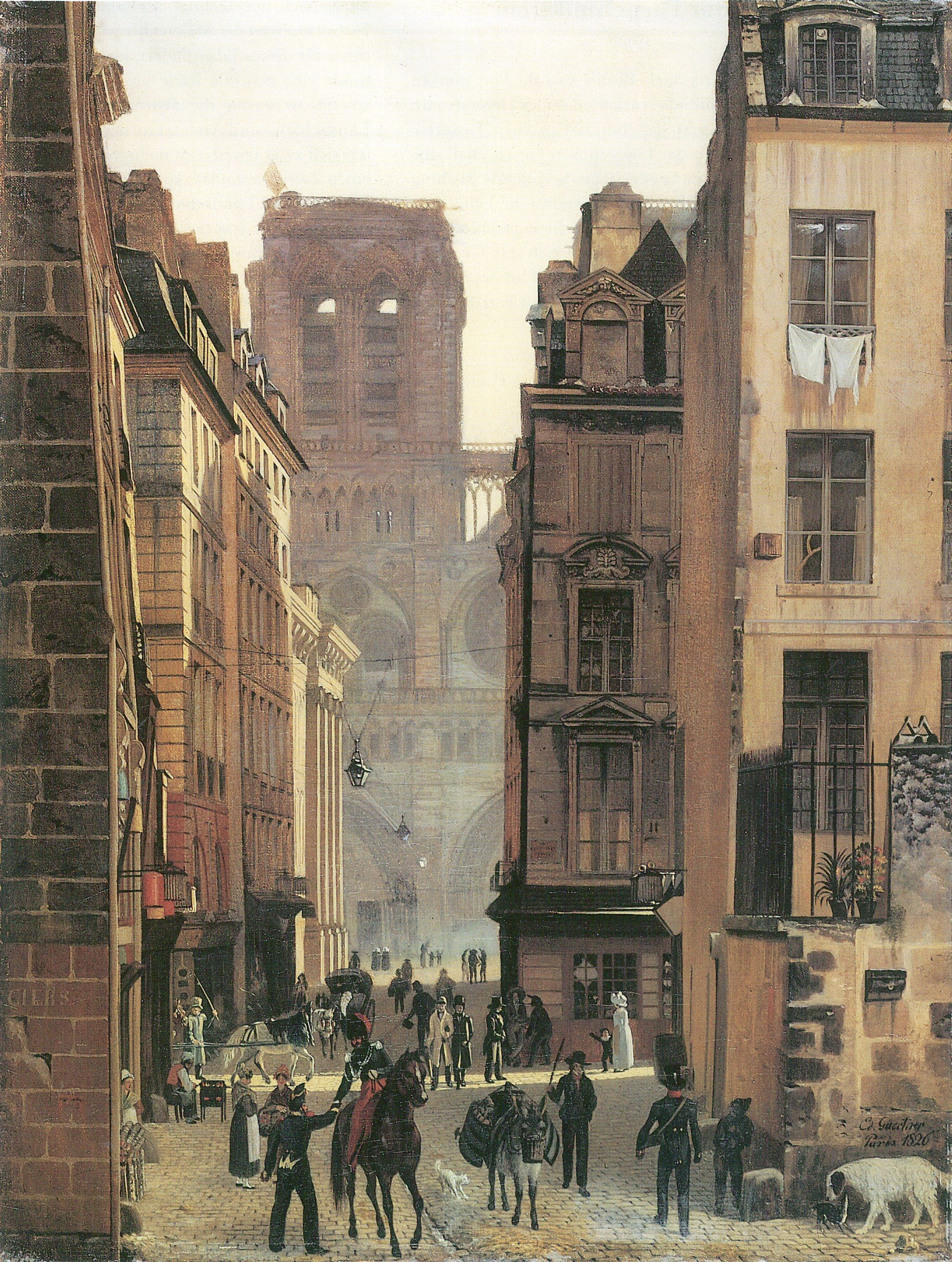
Rue Neuve-Notre-Dame in 1828

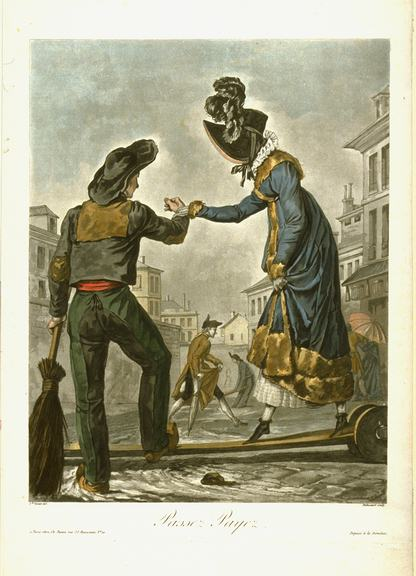
Paying to cross a muddy Paris street (1817)

While Paris during the Restoration had many beautiful monuments and majestic squares, the neighborhoods of the city between the monuments were dark, crowded and crumbling. An English traveller who visited Paris in 1814, at the very beginning of the Restoration, wrote: "The ordinary buildings of Paris, as every traveller has observed and as all the world knows, are in general mean and uncomfortable. The height and gloomy aspect of the houses; the narrowness of the streets, and the want of pavement for foot passengers, convey an idea of antiquity, which ill accords with what the imagination had anticipated of the modern capital of the French Empire." Upper class Parisians began moving to new residential neighborhoods that were created in the north and west; the Quartier Francois I near the Champs-Élysées in 1823, and the quartier Saint-Vincent-de-Paul and quarter de la Europe built in the north in 1824. They had wider streets, sidewalks, and houses modeled after the squares and town houses of London. They also moved to some of the villages outside the edge of the city, particularly Passy, and Beaugrenelle. By 1830, the village of Passy had become part of the city, a main street, rue de Passy, lined with three and four story buildings. At the same time, the older neighborhoods of the city, in the center the east. and grew more crowded every year. The neighborhoods of Arcis and Saint-Avoye, in the modern third arrondissement, had a population density of eight hundred persons per hectare in 1817, eight hundred fifty and 1831, and nine-hundred sixty in 1851, which amounted to nearly one hundred thousand persons per square kilometer.

During the Restoration, the center of economic and social activity in Paris also moved gradually north, away from Les Halles and the Palais-Royal. The commercial and financial activity of the city took place on the right bank between the Madeleine and the Temple, where the stock market and banks were located, while the Grand Boulevards, built on the old ramparts of the city, became the home of the city's new theatres and restaurants, and the place to promenade.

=== Bread, meat and wine ===
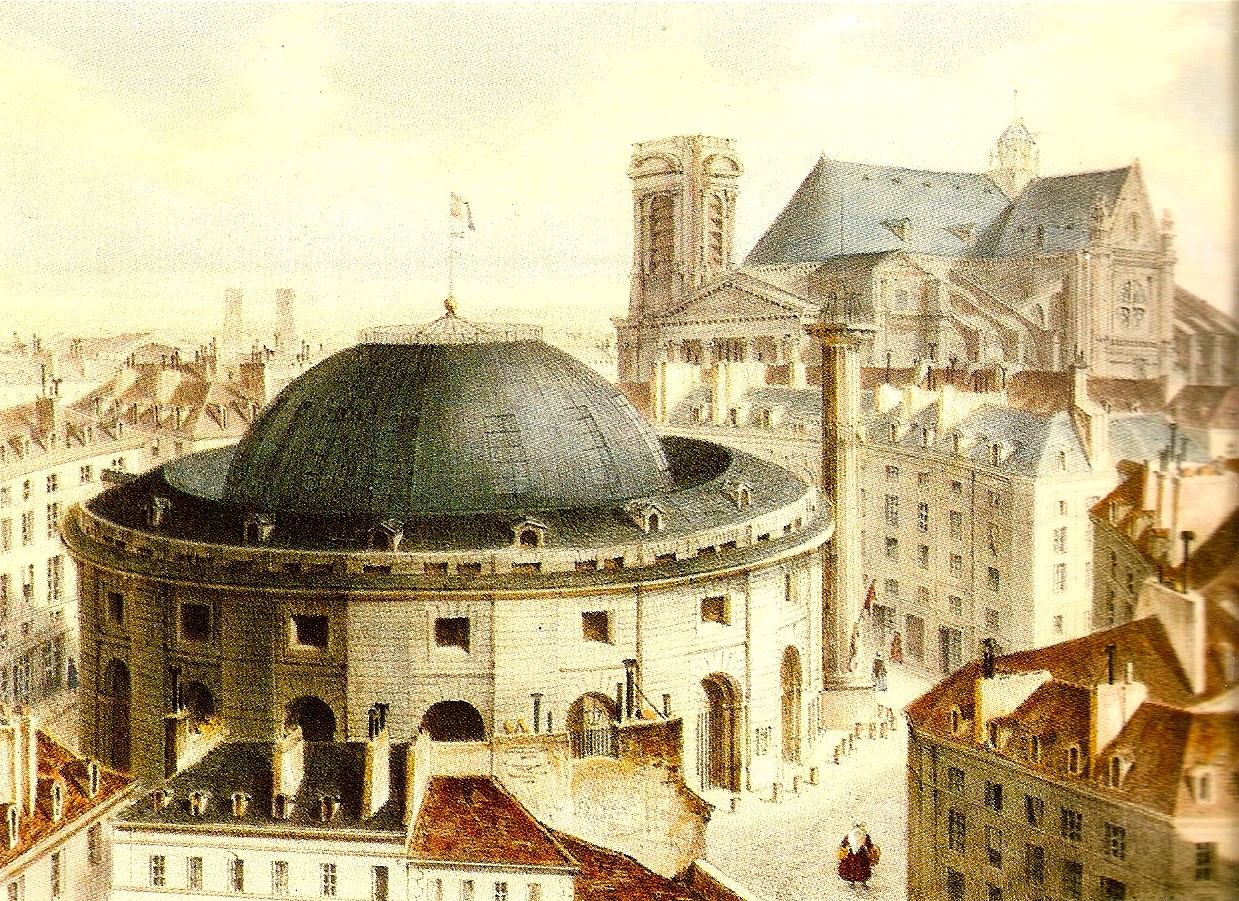
The Halle du Blé, the central grain market of Paris (now the Chamber of Commerce)

According to the 19th century French historian and academician Maxime du Camp, the "primordial elements" of the Paris diet were bread, meat, and wine. Maintaining a steady bread supply for the Parisians was a major preoccupation of the French government during the Restoration; no one had forgotten the consequences of a bread shortage during the Revolution. Bakers were the most strictly regulated of all Paris businessmen; they had to show the police that they had lived a correct and moral life, and to pass a long apprenticeship. They were required to always have bread available, with a three-month reserve of flour; to give notice if they were going to be on vacation, or six months in advance if they intended to close. They were also forbidden to sell bread outside their shop. The price of bread was strictly regulated by the Prefect of Police; as of 1823, a special commission met every fifteen days to set the price. Because the price was fixed artificially low, bakers could not make a living selling bread alone; the designed a wide variety of "fantasy breads" and pastries, from which they earned most of their income.

The wheat for Paris bread was usually grown in the regions of Beauce, Brie and Picardy. They had slightly different tastes and characteristics, and were usually blended by the bakers. The grain was milled outside of Paris and brought to the Halle au Blé, or Wheat Hall, built by Napoleon in December 1811 (The building is now the Paris Chamber of Commerce). The bakers came to the Hall to buy it, then worked, often all night long, to bake it. The baguette had not yet been invented; the standard loaf was crusty outside and white inside: Parisians, even in times of bread shortages, refused to eat dark bread.

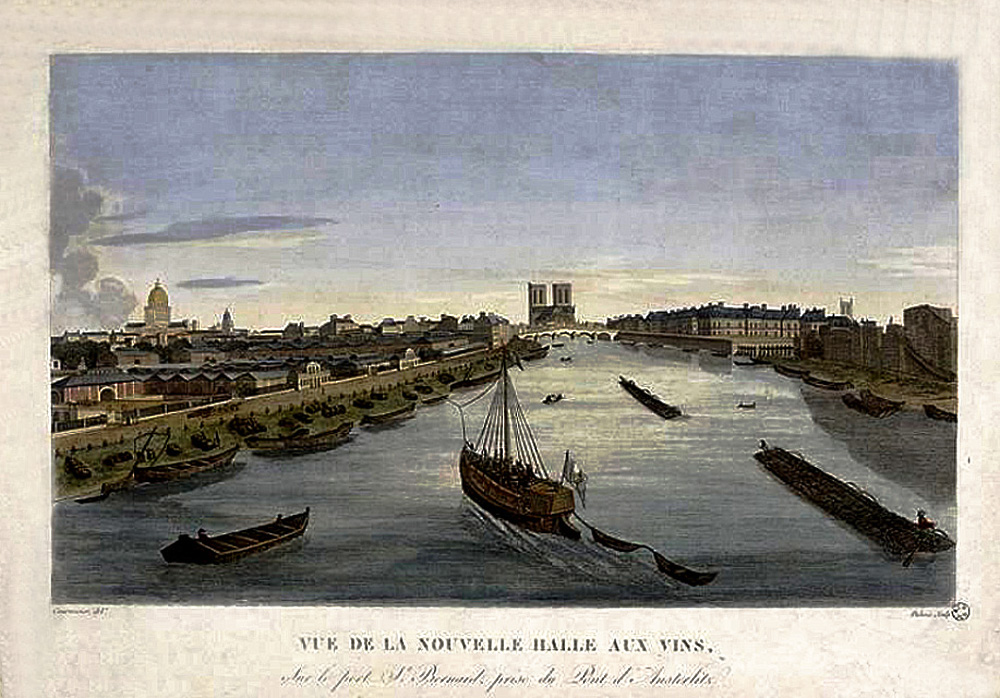
The Halle aux Vins (left), arrival point of all the wine brought in bulk to Paris

Meat was the second base of the diet Parisians consumed an average of sixty kilos of meat a year. The wealthy and middle-class Parisians consumed the better cuts of beef, lamb and veal; poorer Parisians ate mutton, pork and the less-expensive cuts of beef, brains, and tripe, either in soups like bouillon or in sausages and other charcuterie. Until the Restoration the animals were usually brought to the butcher shops and slaughtered in the courtyard; the sound was terrible and the streets outside ran with blood. Napoleon ordered the construction of five slaughterhouses, or abbatoires, three on the right bank and two on the left, around the edges of the city. They were constructed between 1810 and 1818 at Montmartre, Menilmontant, Roule, Grenelle, and Villejuif.

Wine was the third essential part of the Parisian diet. The daily alcohol consumption of the Paris working class was high; in times of economic difficulty, the consumption of other food products decreased, but the consumption of wine increased; it was consumed to relieve stress and to forget difficulties. Low-quality and inexpensive wines were made a vineyards just outside the city. The best quality wines were brought by wine merchants from the chateaux of Burgundy and Bordeaux. By far the largest quantity of wine arrived by boat at the Halle aux Vins, which was located on the quai des Bernardins between rue Cuvier and Place Maubert, next to the Jardin des Plantes. The Halle aux Vins had been started in 1808 and finished in 1818; it occupied fourteen hectares, and had 159 wine cellars at street level and another forty-nine caves. All bulk wine, spirits, oils and vinegars were required to pass through the Halle, where the alcohol level was measured and taxes were collected; wine and spirits with more than eighteen percent alcohol paid a higher tax.

The wine was delivered in large barrels from vineyards in Beaujolais, Cahors, Burgundy, and the Touraine; they could be told apart because each region had a different size and shape of barrel. The wines were frequently mixed to make an ordinary table wine. These were the wines commonly served in homes, the taverns and less-expensive eating places of Paris. In 1818 the Halle took in and taxed 752,795 hectoliters of wine, or about one hundred liters per year for every resident of Paris.

=== Street lights ===
The street lighting in Paris between 1814 and 1830 was provided by 4,645 oil lamps, called reverbères. They were spaced far apart and provided only a dim illumination. The gas lamp had been patented in 1799 and first installed in a Paris residence on rue Saint-Dominique in 1800, and the first gas lamps were installed in the Passage des Panoramas in January 1817 by a German businessman named Winsor. He received a commission to install gas lights in one of the legislative chambers of the Luxembourg Palace, but opponents of gas lamps warned of a risk of explosions, and blocked the project. Only two establishments took the risk of lighting with gas; a bathhouse on rue de Chartres and a café near the Hôtel de Ville, which boldly took the name Café du gas hydrogène. The first four municipal gas lamps were illuminated on the place du Carrousel on 1 January 1829, along with twelve more on the rue de Rivoli. The experiment was judged a success, a design for a lamppost was selected and gas lamps appeared the same year on rue de la Paix, place Vendôme, rue de l'Odeon and rue de Castiglione.

=== The Seine - the floating baths and the bateau-lavoir ===
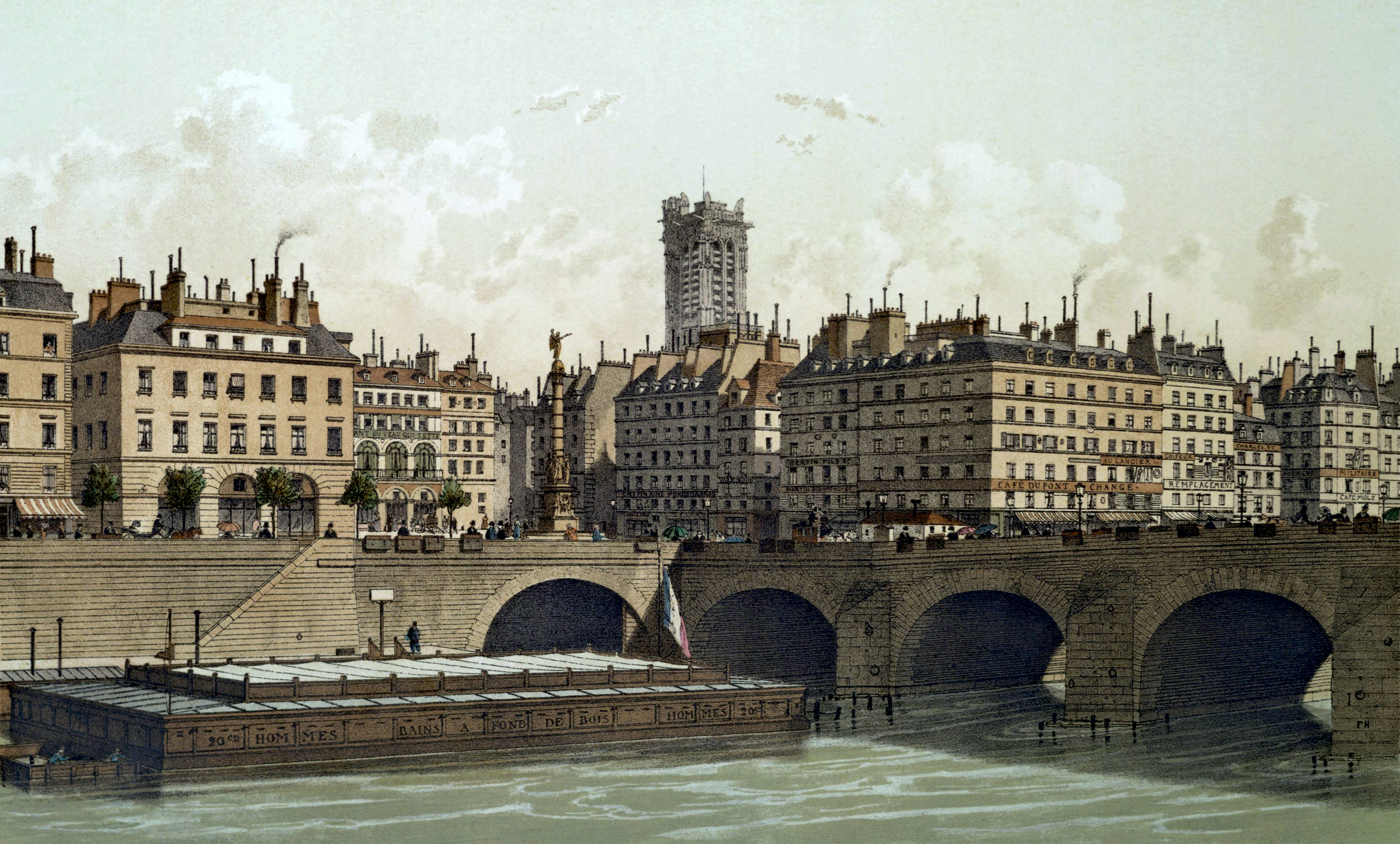
A floating bath at Place du Châtelet (1830)

Before the arrival of the railroad, the Seine was still the main artery for the delivery of goods to Paris; huge rafts of firewood arrived daily for heating and cooking; barges of wine, grain, stone and other products were unloaded at the ports along the river. It also was a place where Parisians bathed. Only the wealthiest Parisians had bathtubs at home. There were numerous public baths, but they had a generally scandalous reputation. With the arrival of fresh water from the Ourq canal, steam baths became popular; there were sixty-seven in Paris in 1832. But for ordinary Parisians in the 19th century, the most popular bathing places were the floating baths anchored along the Seine between the Pont d'Austerlitz and the Pont d'Iéna. They were composed of a large barge with a basin in the center surrounded by wooden galleries with dressing rooms. There were separate baths for men and women. The price was four sous, or twenty centimes, and bathing costumes could be rented for an additional charge. They were extremely popular in summer, and remained until the end of the 19th century.

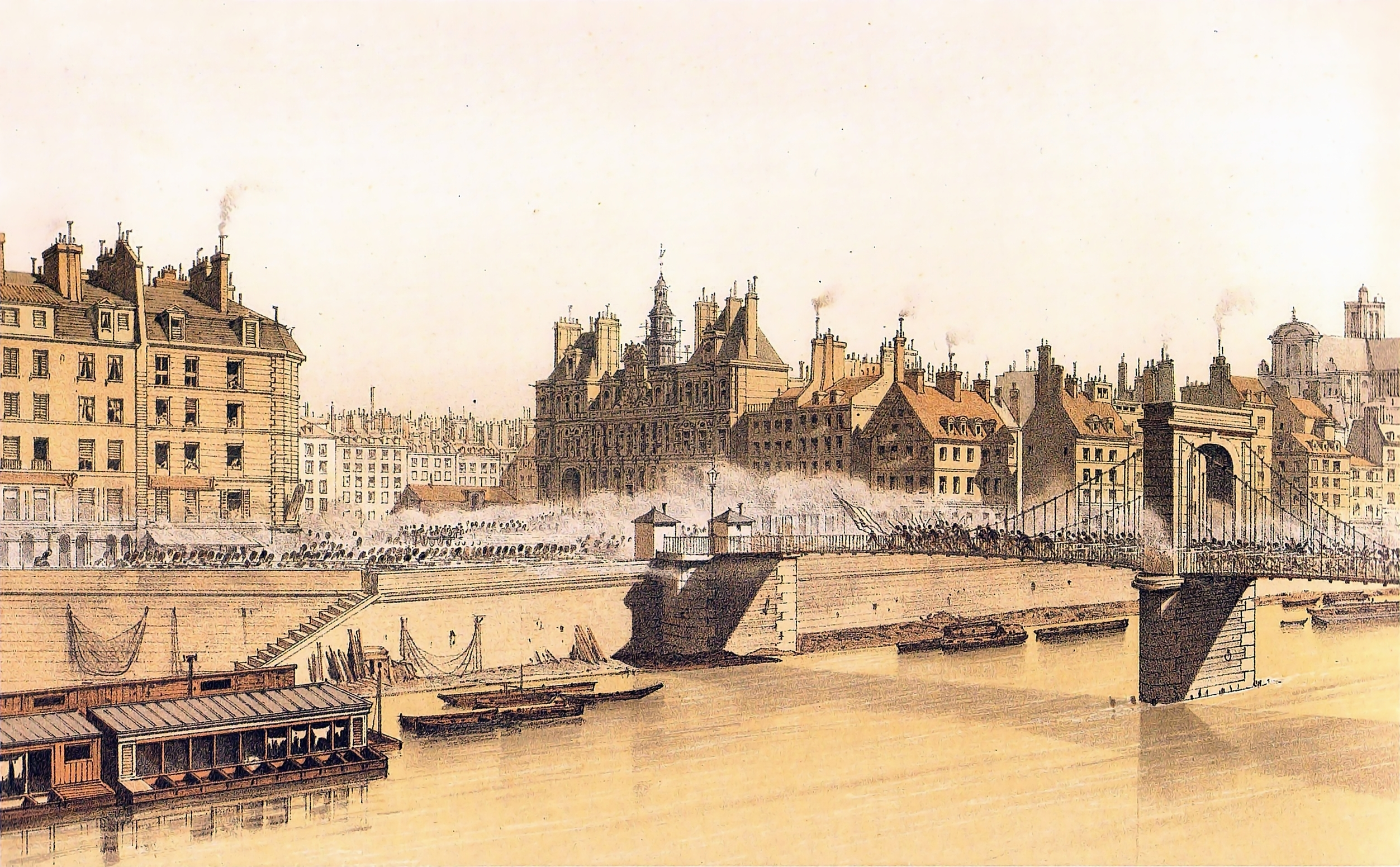
A bateau-lavoir, or laundry boat, near the Hôtel-de-Ville during the July 1830 Revolution

Another Seine institution was the bateau-lavoir, or floating laundry, where lavandrieres, or laundry women, came to wash clothing and bed linen. They were mostly located on the right bank, where they profited from the sunshine for drying the laundry. By the Restoration, they were very large, and generally had two levels the lower deck had benches or tables close to the water, where the washing was done, and then clothes were taken to the upper deck to dry in the sun. The lavandrieres paid a charge to the owner of the barge for each visit. The last bateau-lavoir closed in 1937.

=== The sewers and the public toilets ===
Napoleon had begun the construction of a new sewer system for Paris in 1805, under the direction of Emmanuel Bruneseau, named Inspector of Sewers. He built a network of 26 kilometers of tunnels, with eighty-six separate lines under the streets. By 1824 the sewers had been expanded to 25 kilometers of covered sewers on the right bank, 9.5 kilometers on the left bank, and 387 meters of sewers on the islands. There were an additional two kilometers of open sewers, not counting the Rivier Bièvre, where much sewage and industrial waste was dumped. These were the sewers that became famous in Victor Hugo's Les Miserables, The sewers were primarily for carrying away rain water and mud; very few homes in Paris had toilets or indoor plumbing or were connected to a sewer. The human waste of the Parisians went into outdoor latrines, usually on the courtyards of the buildings, or cesspools and was carried away at night by laborers called vidangeurs to large dumps created for this purpose at the Buttes des Chaumont and other sites around the edge of the city.

Until late during the Restoration, Paris had no public toilets; people simply relieved themselves wherever they could; the hedges of the Tuileries Gardens were popular for this purpose. The Duke of Orleans was the first to install a dozen public toilets, called cabinets d'aisances, at the Palais-Royal, with a charge of two sous for each seat, and toilet paper free. By 1816, public toilets for a fee could also be found on Rue Vivienne, across from the public treasury, and in the Luxembourg and Tuileries gardens. An 1819 guidebook praised the toilets at the Palais-Royal; "Cabinets of an extreme cleanliness, an attractive woman at the counter, doorkeepers full of enthusiasm; everything enchants the senses and the client gives ten or twenty times the amount asked." .

In the spring of 1830 the city government decided to install the first public urinals, called Vespasiennes, on the major boulevards. These structures served both as urinals and supports for posters and advertising. They were put in place by the summer, but in July they were put to a completely different purpose; providing materials for street barricades during the 1830 Revolution.

== Transportation ==
=== The fiacres and the omnibus ===
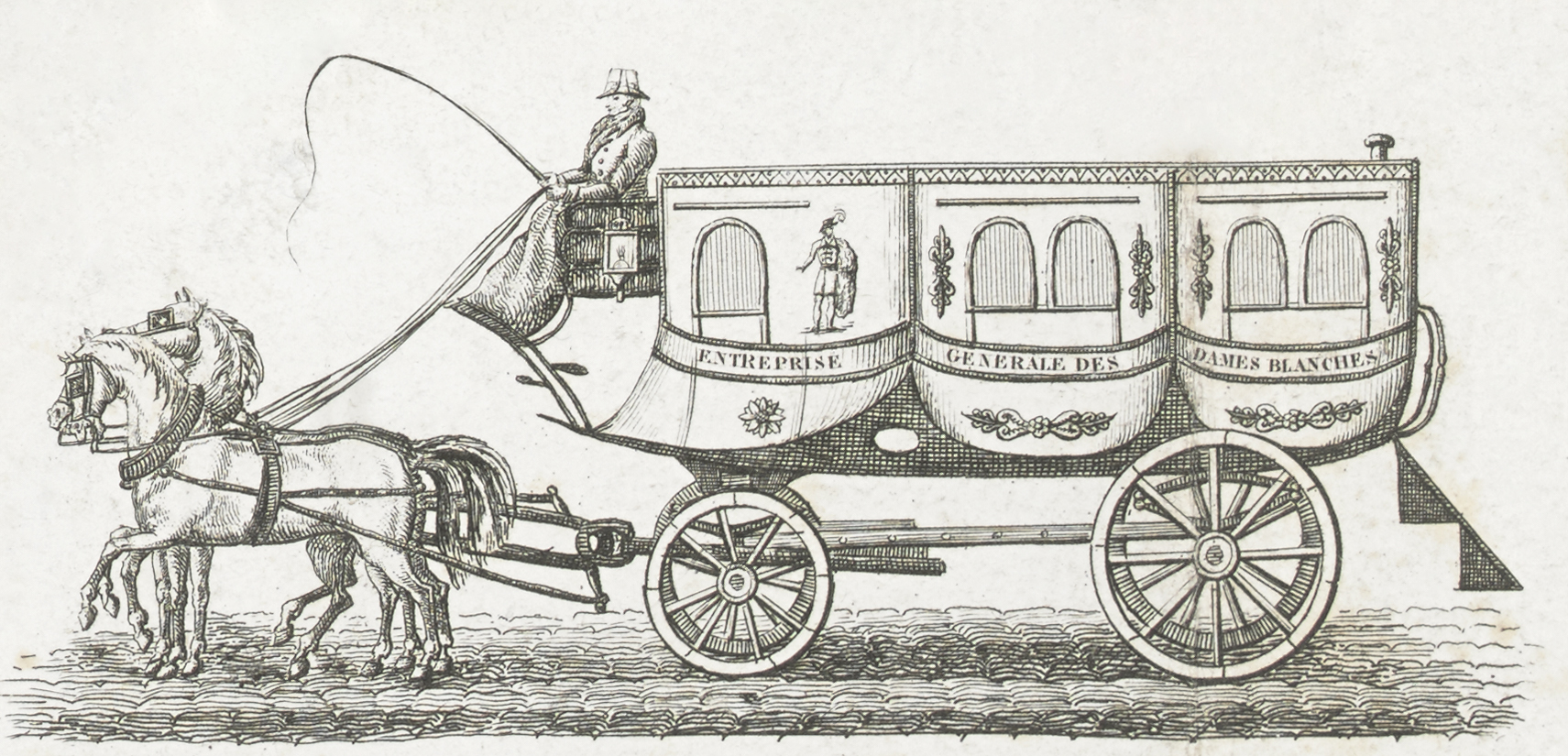
A Dame Blanche omnibus (1828)

At the beginning of the Restoration, Paris had no public transport system. Wealthy Parisians had their own carriages, kept within the courtyards of the town houses. Wealthy visitors could hire a carriage by the hour or by the day. For those with a more modest income, taxi service was provided by fiacres, small boxlike four-wheeled coaches which could carry up to four passengers, hired at designated stations around the city, where passengers paid by the time of the journey. In 1818, there were 900 registered fiacres in Paris. There were 161 fiacre companies in Paris in 1820, most with one or two coaches each. Those without the means to hire a fiacre or carriage travelled by foot.

On 28 April 1828, a major improvement in public transportation arrived; the first omnibus began service, running every fifteen minutes between La Madeleine and la Bastille. Before long, there were one hundred omnibuses in service, with eighteen different itineraries. A journey cost twenty-five centimes. The omnibuses circulated between seven in the morning and seven in the evening; each omnibus could carry between twelve and eighteen passengers. The busiest line was that along the Grand Boulevards; it ran from eight in the morning until midnight.

The Paris omnibus was created by a businessman named Stanislas Baudry, who had started the first omnibus company in Nantes in 1823. The name was said to come from the station of the first line in Nantes, in front of the store of a hat-maker named Omnes, who had a large sign on his building with a pun on his name, "Omnes Omnibus" ("All for everyone" in Latin). Following his success in Nantes, Baudry moved to Paris and founded the Enterprise des Omnibus, with headquarters on rue de Lancre, and with workshops on the quai de Jemmapes. The omnibus service was an immediate popular success, with more than two and a half million passengers in the first six months. However, there was no reliable way to collect money from the passengers, or the fare collectors kept much of the money for themselves; In its first years the company was continually on the verge of bankruptcy, and in despair, Baudry committed suicide in February 1830 Baudry's partners reorganised the company and managed to keep it in business.

In September 1828, a competing company, les Dames-Blanches, had started running its own vehicles. In 1829 and the following years, more companies with poetic names entered the business; les Citadines, les Tricycles, les Orléanises, les Diligentes, les Écossaises, les Béarnaises, les Carolines, les Batignollaises, les Parisiennes, les Hirondelles, les Joséphines, les Excellentes, les Sylphides, les Constantines, les Dames-Françaises, les Algériennes, les Dames-Réunies, and les Gazelles. The omnibus had a profound effect on Parisian life, making it possible for Parisians to work and have a social life outside their own neighborhoods.

For those travelling greater distances, to other cities or the Paris suburbs, several companies ran diligences, large enclosed coaches which could carry six or more passengers. Smaller coaches, called Coucous, departed from the Place Louis XVI and from place d'Enfer to Sceaux, Saint-Cloud, Versailles and other destinations.

=== Steamboats and canals ===
The American inventor Robert Fulton had tried without success to interest Napoleon in his invention, the steamboat, but the innovation finally arrived in Paris in 1826, with the opening of the first regular steamboat service on the Seine between Paris and Saint-Cloud.

The early 19th century was the great age of the canal, both as a source of drinking water and as a means of transportation, and the government of the Restoration actively promoted their construction. The canal de l'Ourcq, decreed by Napoleon in May 1801, was completed in 1822. It was 108 kilometers long, and became a major source of the drinking water for the Parisians. It was also useful for navigation. In 1821 it was connected by the canal Saint-Denis, 6.5 kilometers long, to the basin at la Villette, which became a major commercial port for barges and boats bringing goods to the city. The Canal Saint-Martin, finished in 1825 and 4.5 kilometers long, completed the city's canal network; it joined the basin of the Arsenal and the Seine with the basin of La Villette. The canals allowed large boats and barges to bypass the center of Paris and avoid having to navigate under the bridges.

== Religion ==
With the return of Louis XVIII and his court, the Catholic Church again took a prominent role in the government and city. Government support for the church increased from 12 million livres under Napoleon to 33 million during the Restoration. The government and church together built new churches to replace those demolished during the Revolution and the Directory, and refilled the ranks of the clergy, greatly reduced during the Revolution. Seven hundred new priests were ordained in all of France in 1814; 1,400 in 1821 and 2,350 in 1829. Bishops and archbishops were chosen, as they had been under the Old Regime, based on their family connections with the Regime. Many rules, dropped during the Empire, were brought back into force; all businesses were required to close on Sunday, including the guingettes, or taverns on the outskirts of the city, where working Parisians were accustomed to spend their Sunday afternoons. Parisians were instructed to come out of their homes and show reverence when religious processions passed. The church denied religious burials to former revolutionaries and to actors, sometimes leading to riots outside the churches. An English visitor in 1814 was told that forty thousand of the 600,000 Parisians attended church regularly, but wrote: "to judge from the very small numbers we have seen attending the regular service in any of the churches, we should this proportion greatly overrated. Of those whom we have seen there, at least two-thirds have been women above fifty, or girls under fifteen years of age."

The number of Protestants in Paris grew during the Restoration, but remained very small, less than two percent, mostly Lutherans and Calvinists. Two new organizations appeared in the Paris during the Restoration, the Biblical Society of Paris (1818) and the Society of Evangelical Missions of Paris (1822). The Jews of France had been granted French citizenship after the Revolution by a government decree on 27, 1790, and the system of synagogues had been organised by a decree of Napoleon on 11 December 1808. The Jewish community grew during the Restoration, largely by an immigration of Ashkenazi Jews from Lorraine and Alsace. A new synagogue was dedicated in Paris on 5 March 1822.

== The University and Grandes Ecoles ==
The University of Paris had been closed during the Revolution, and did not re-open until 1806 under Napoleon as the Université Imperial. By 1808 it had faculties of theology, law, medicine, mathematics and physical sciences, and letters. It was closely supervised by the royalist government; faculty members were named by the government, not by the faculties, and tended to be chosen more for their political connections than academic accomplishments. The University students, largely the children of the growing Parisian middle class, were much more politically active than previous generations; many vocally advocated a return to a Republic and the abolition of the monarchy. There were violent demonstrations in 1819 against the dismissal of a liberal professor, in 1820 against the government, in which a student was killed at the Place du Carrousel. The student's funeral was the scene of larger demonstrations; they were ended by a cavalry charge which killed several persons. There were more public demonstrations demanding a more liberal government in 1825 1826 and 1827, and students played an important part in the demonstrations that finally brought down the Bourbon monarchy in July 1830.

While the University produced doctors, lawyers and teachers. the Grandes Ecoles produced the engineers and most of the economic and scientific specialists who led the industrial revolution and rapid economic growth of the mid-19th century. The first business school in Paris, the École Speciale de Commerce (later renamed the École Supérieure de Commerce) was founded in 1819.

== Amusement ==
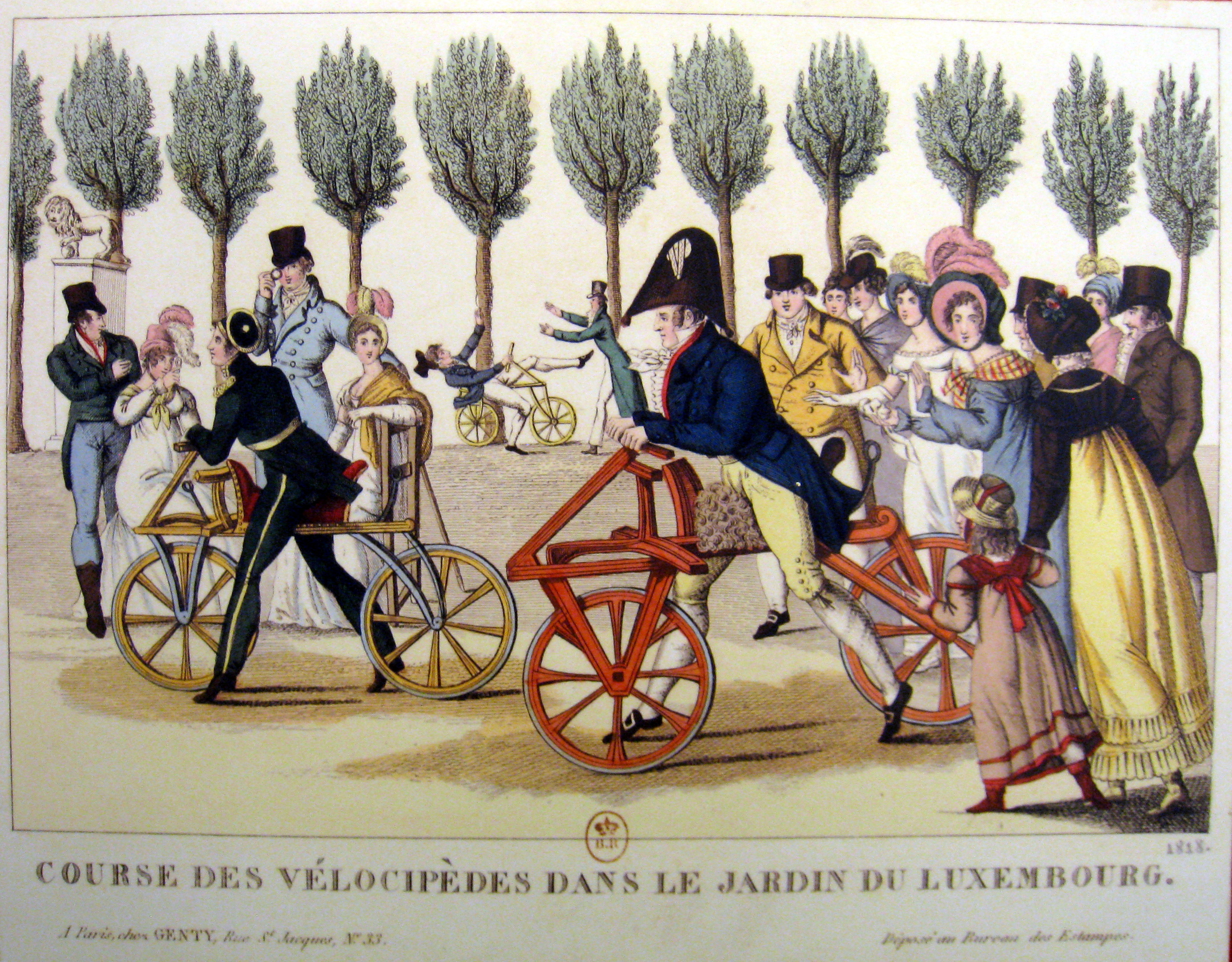
The Draisienne, ancestor of the bicycle, is introduced in the Luxembourg Gardens (1818).

The Parisians of the Restoration were in a constant search for new ways to amuse themselves, from restaurants to promenades to sports. The first roller coaster, called the Promenades Aériennes, opened in the Jardin Baujon in July 1817. The Draisienne, an ancestor of the bicycle without pedals invented by a German nobleman, was introduced in the Luxembourg Gardens in 1818. The first giraffe to be seen in Paris, a gift from the Pasha of Egypt to Charles X, was put on display in the Jardin des Plantes on 30 June 1827.

=== The Palais-Royal ===
The Palais-Royal, with its arcades and gardens, shops, cafes and restaurants, remained the most famous destination for amusement in Paris. Originally constructed as the residence of Cardinal Richelieu, It became the property of the Orleans family, close relatives of the King. In the 1780s, Louis Philippe II, Duke of Orléans, badly in need of funds, Created arcades and galleries around the garden, rented them out to small shops and the first luxury restaurants in Paris, and opened the Palais-Royal it to the public. In 1789 he actively supported the French Revolution, renamed himself Louis-Egalité, renamed the Palais-Royal the Palais-Egalité, and voted for the death of his cousin Louis XVI, but nonetheless he was guillotined during the Reign of Terror. His heir was Louis-Philippe I, who lived in exile during the Revolution and the Empire. He returned to Paris with the Restoration, and took up residence in one wing of what was again called the Palais-Royal.

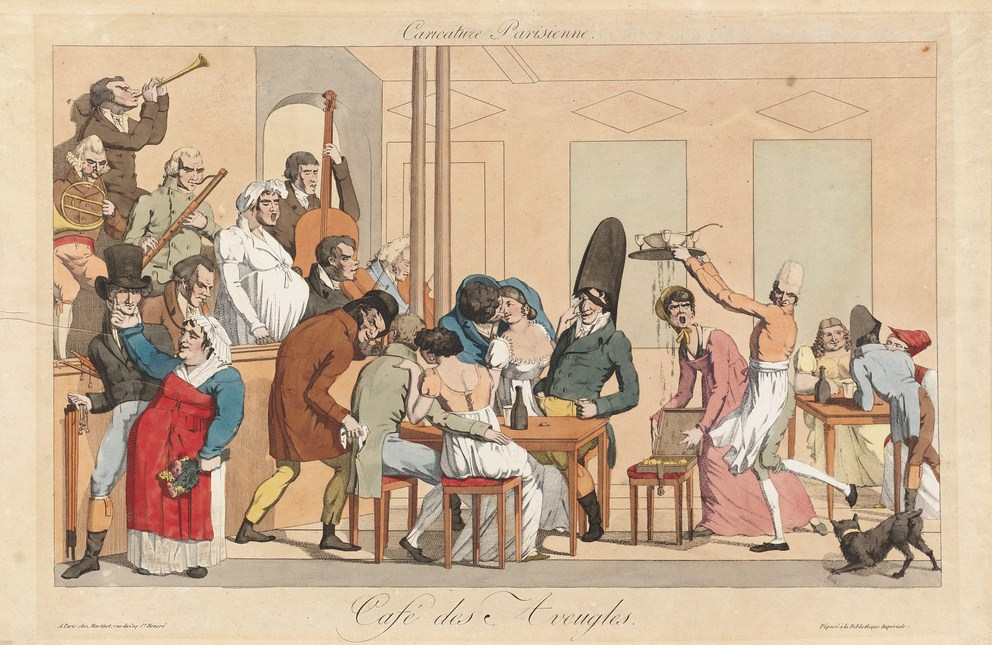
The Café des Aveugles in the basement of the Palais-Royal

During the Restoration, the Palais-Royal had, in and around its former gardens, three large arcades, one of stone (still existing), one of glass and one of wood (popularly known as the Campe des Tatares. In 1807, shortly before the Restoration, they contained 180 shops, including twenty-four jewelers, twenty shops of luxury furniture, fifteen restaurants, twenty-nine cafes and seventeen billiards parlors. Shops in the galleries sold, among other things, perfume, musical instruments, toys, eyeglasses, candy, gloves, and dozens of other goods. Artists painted portraits, and small stands offered waffles. The Palais-Royal attracted all different classes of Parisians, from the wealthy to the working class.

In the evenings, the shops closed and a different life began at the Palais-Royal. The basements had cafes which served drinks and inexpensive food, and had entertainment, ranging from music to ventriloquists and costumed "savages" dancing. The best-known was the Café des Aveugles, famous for its orchestra of blind musicians. The more elegant restaurants on the arcade level had extensive menus and wine lists, and served a wealthier clientele. Upstairs, above the shops, were card rooms, where Parisians went to gamble.

Besides shopping and restaurants, the Palais-Royal was also famous as the place to meet prostitutes; as the evening advanced, they filled the galleries. Between 1816 and 1825, the merchants of the Palais-Royal complained about the number of prostitutes, and asked that they not be allowed to do business between December 15 and January 15, when Parisians did their holiday shopping. In 1829, the Prefect of Police finally closed the Palais to prostitutes.

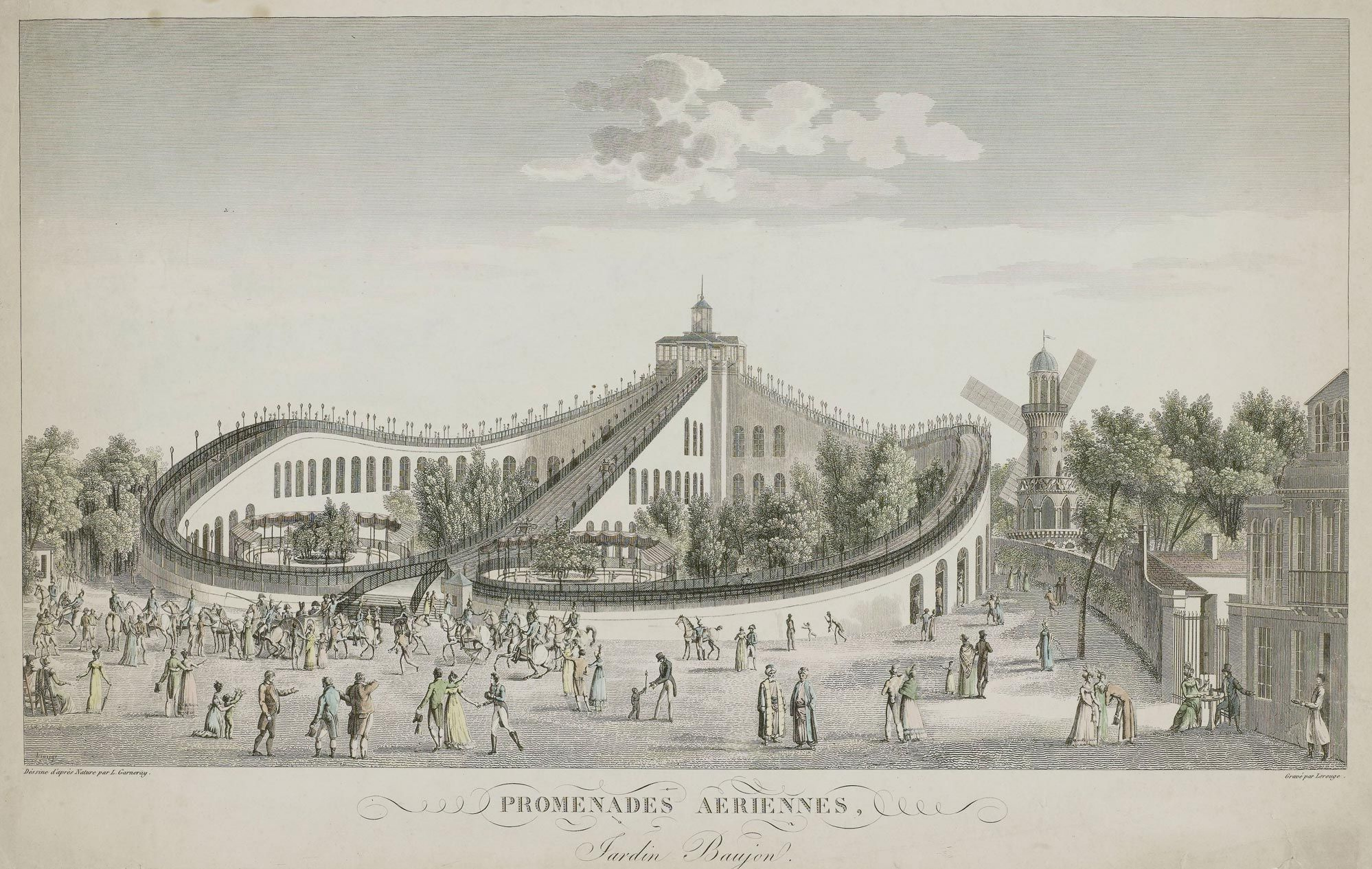
The first roller-coaster at Parc Beaujon (1817).

=== Amusement Parks ===
The Amusement park, or Parc d'Attractions, had appeared in Paris in the 1860s and continued to be popular through the Restoration. They were gardens which, in summer, had cafes, orchestras, dancing, fireworks and other entertainments. The most famous was the Tivoli, which remained in business on 27 rue de Clichy from 1777 until 1825. A similar park, Idalie, on rue Quentin-Bauchart, was in business until 1817. The Parc Beaujon, at 114-152 Champs-Élysées, opened in 1817, offered the most spectacular attraction; the first Montagnes Russes, or roller coaster.

=== Restaurants, cafés, the bistrot and the guinguette ===
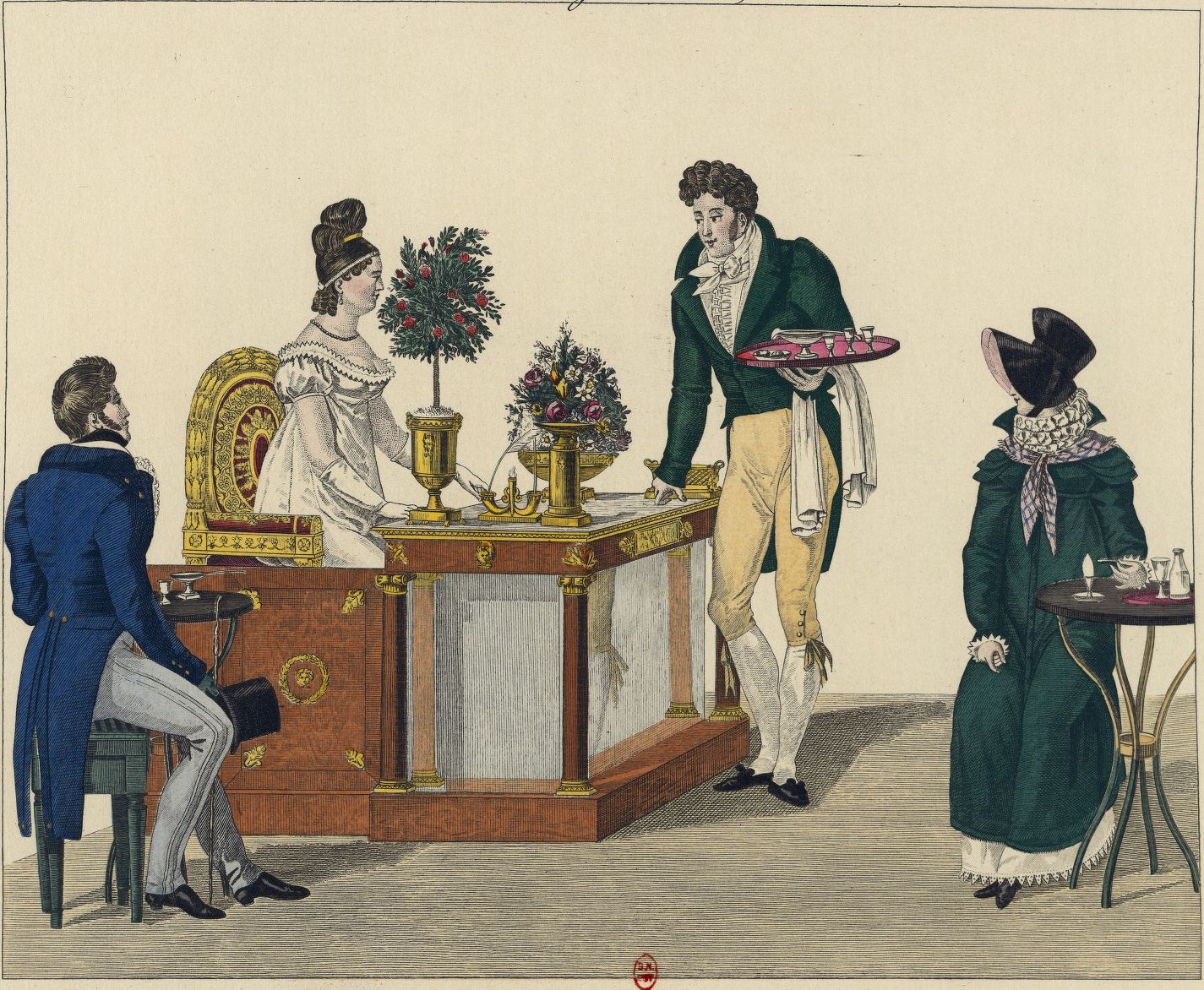
The Belle Limonadière in a café (1827)

The first luxury restaurants in Paris had opened in the Palais-Royal in the 1780s. By the time of the Restoration, new restaurants had appeared close to the theatres, along the Grand Boulevards and on the Champs Èlysées. The best-known luxury restaurant of the Restoration was the Rocher de Cancale, at the corner of rue Mandar. The elaborate dinners there were described in detail in the novels of Honoré de Balzac. The restaurant Le Veau on the Place de Chatelet was famous for its pieds de mouton. Other famous gastronomic restaurants of the time were Le Grand Véfour in the Palais-Royal and Ledoyen the Champs-Élysées (both still in business), La Galiote and le Cadran bleu on the Boulevard du Temple.

The café was an important social institution of the period, not as a place to eat but as an establishment to meet friends, drink coffee, read the newspapers, play checkers and discuss politics. In the early 19th century, cafés diversified; some, called cafés- chantant, had singing; others offered concerts and dancing. During the Restoration, many of the cafés began serving ice cream.

The bistrot was another kind of eating place that appeared during the Restoration. It was said to take its name from the Russian word for "quickly", because during the occupation of the city Russian soldiers had to hurry back to their barracks. They offered simple and inexpensive meals, usually in a congenial atmosphere. The guinguette was a type of rural tavern, usually located just outside the city limits, particularly in Montmartre, Belleville, and other nearby villages. Since they were outside the city limits, the taxes were lower and the drinks were less expensive. They usually had musicians, and were very popular places for dancing on the weekends. They suffered from the stricter rules of the Restoration, which banned amusement during the day on Sundays. In 1830 there were 138 within the city, and 229 just outside the city limits.

== Fashion ==
Paris fashions (1814-1830)

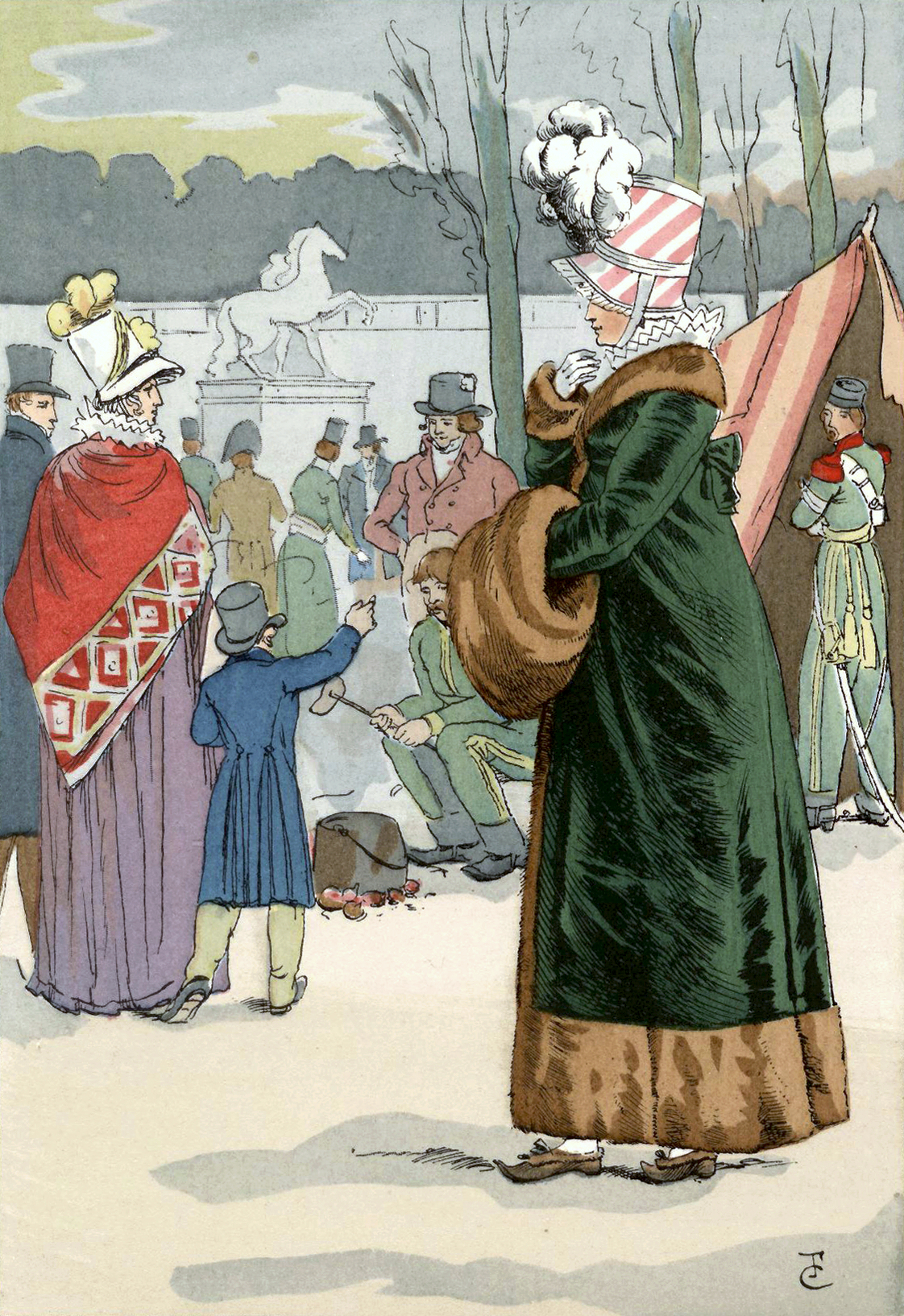
A Parisienne visits the cossack camp on the Champs-Èlysées (1814)

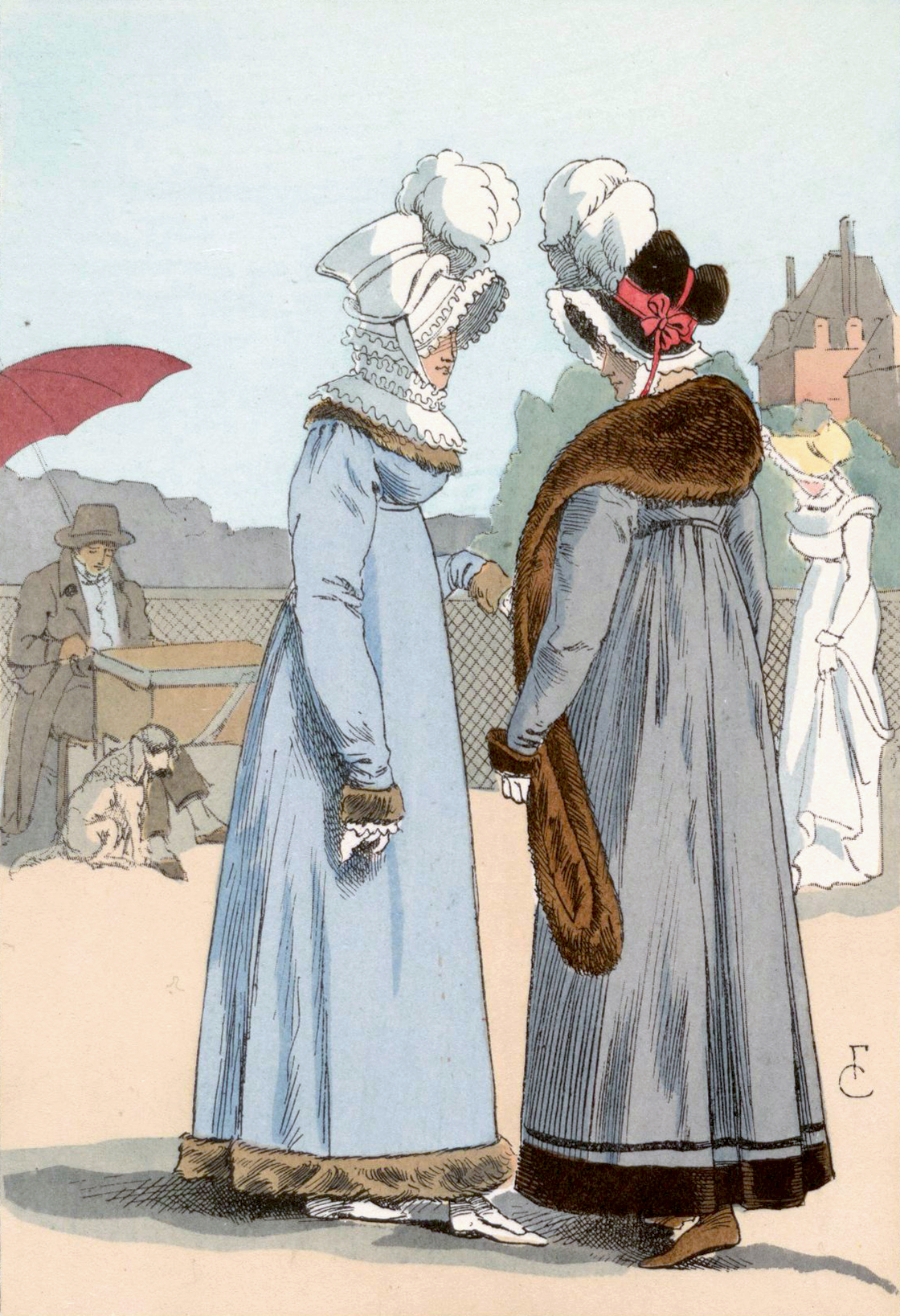
Two Parisiennes on the Pont des Arts (1816)

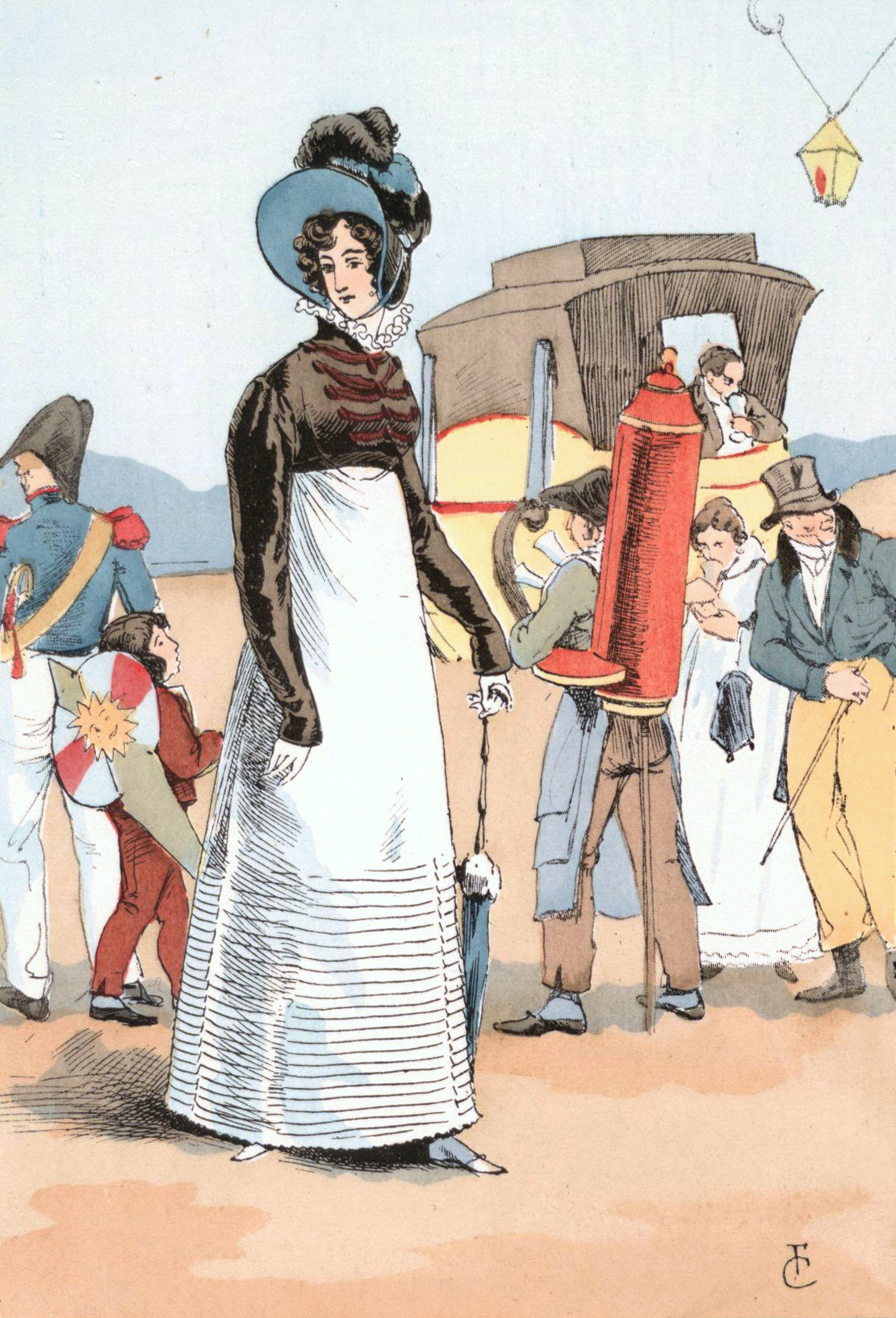
A Parisienne meets the Saint-Cloud coach (1817)

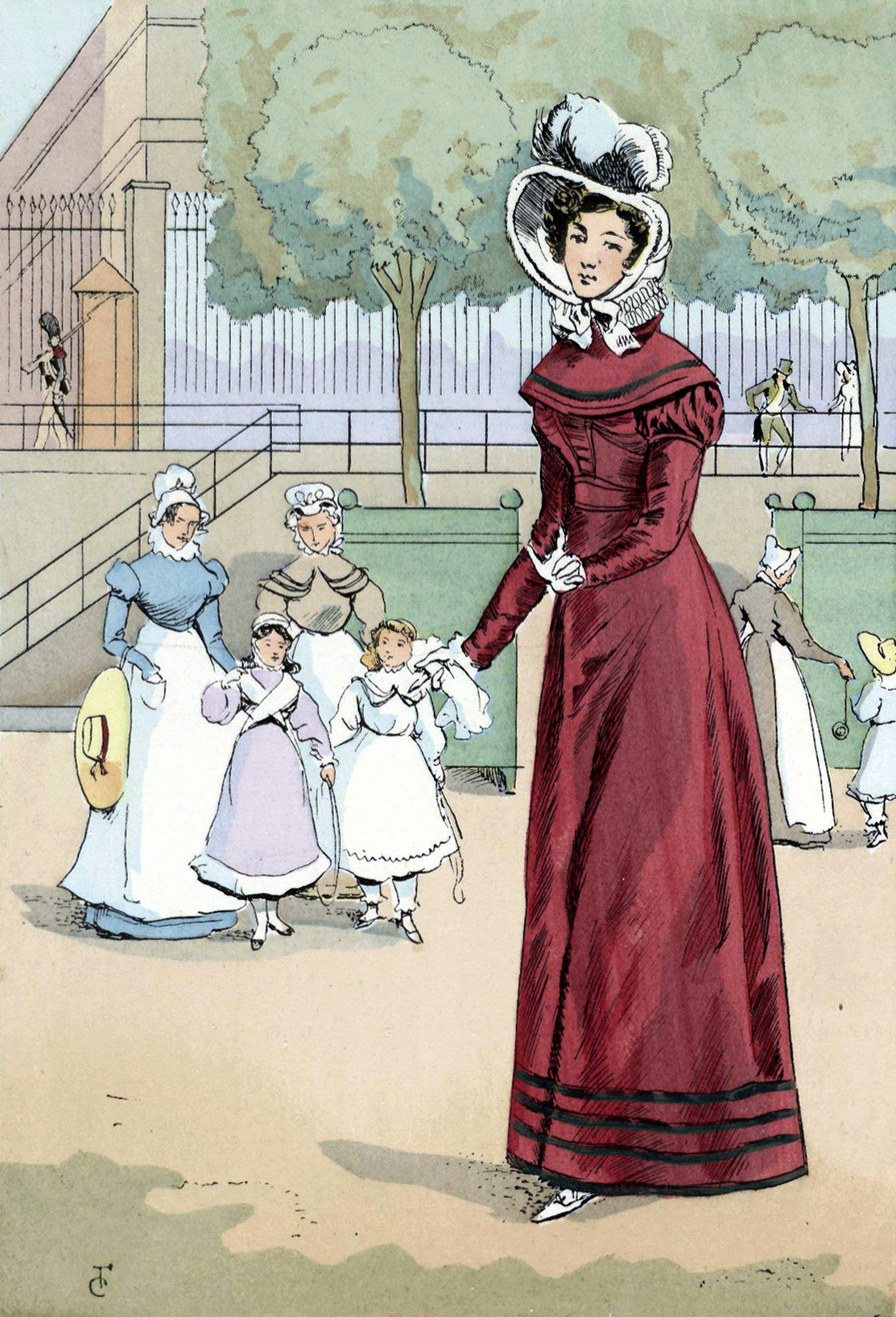
A Parisienne in the Tuileries Gardens (1819)

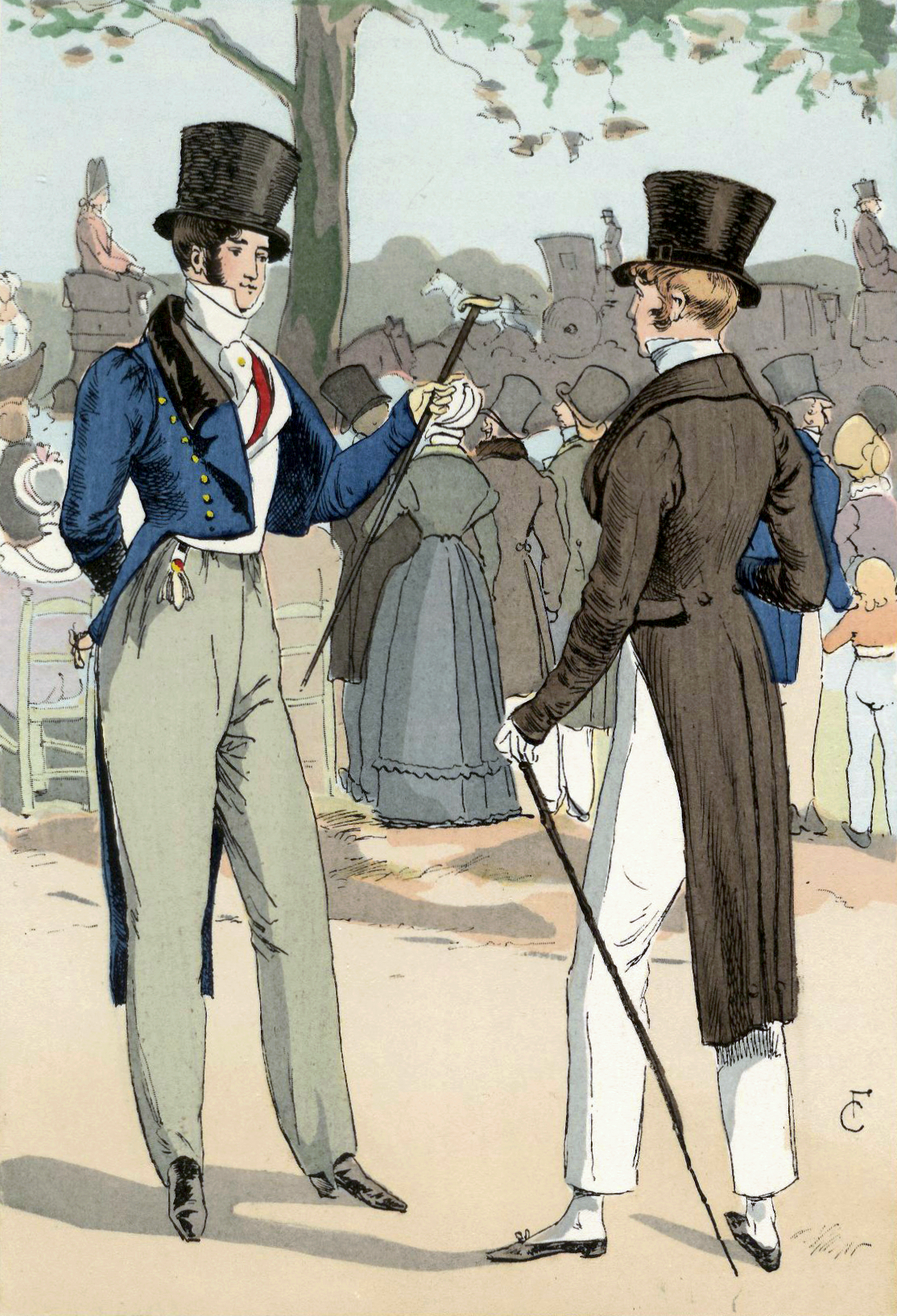
at the Longchamps races (1820)

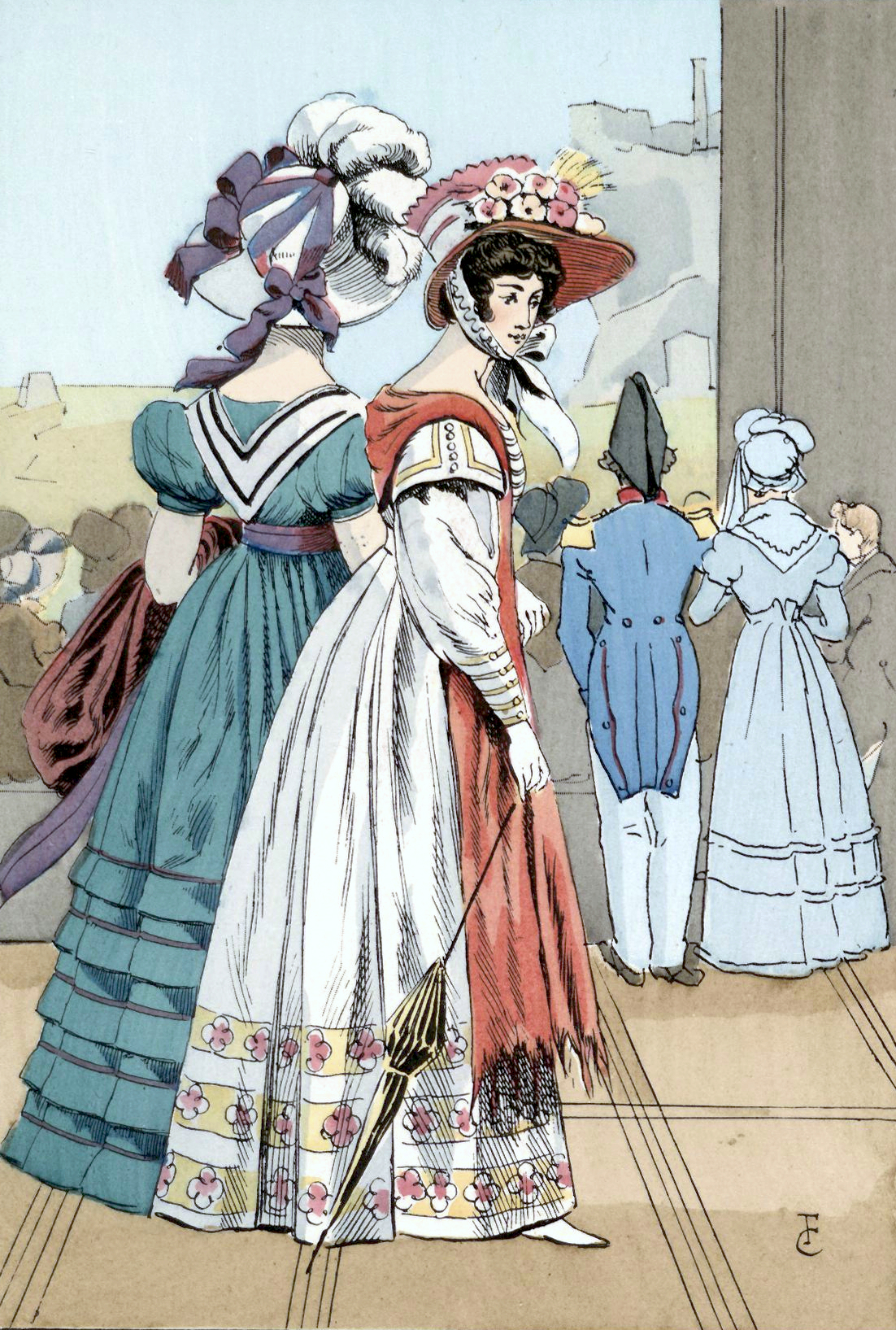
Parisiennes at a Panorama (1824)

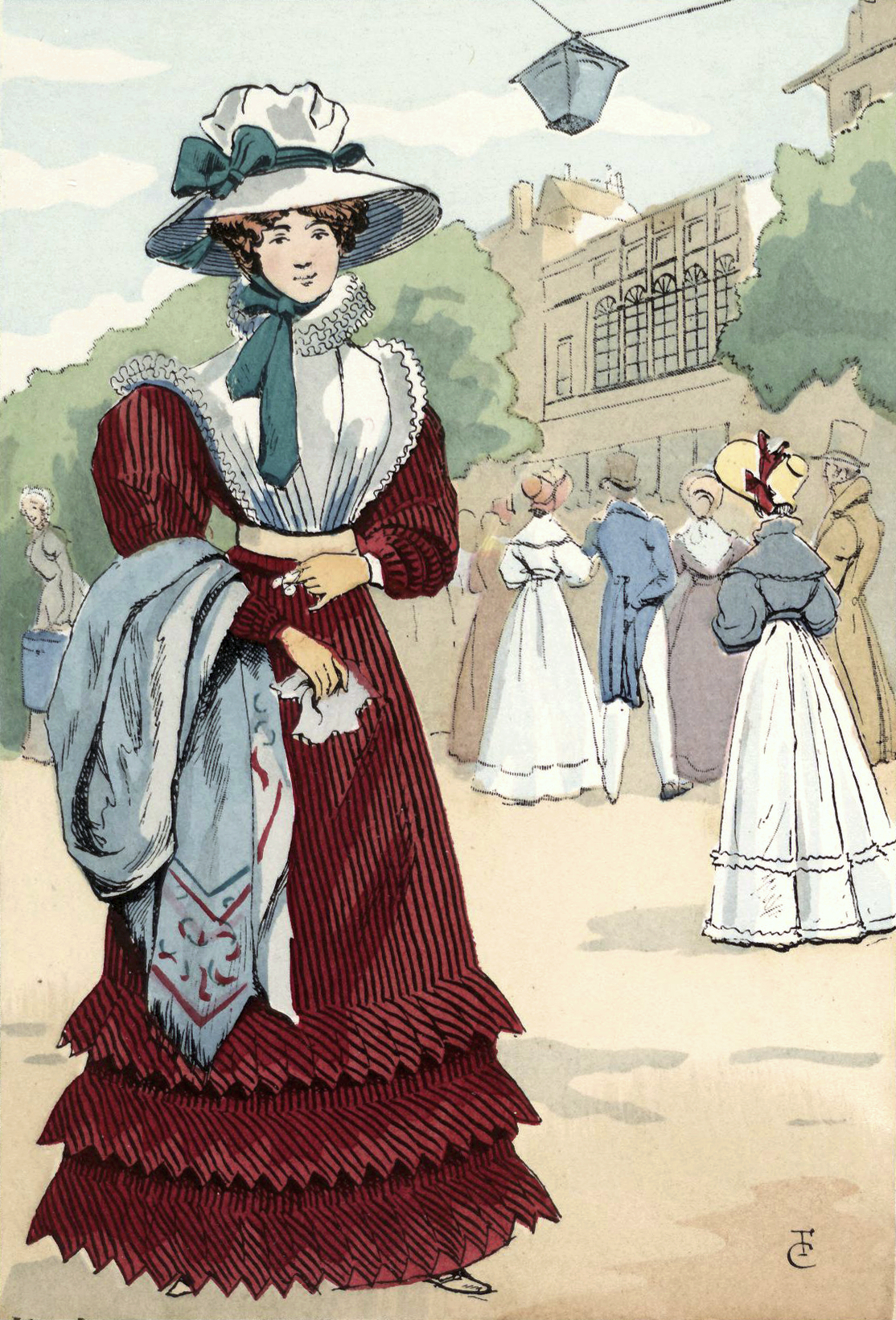
Outside the theatre (1827)

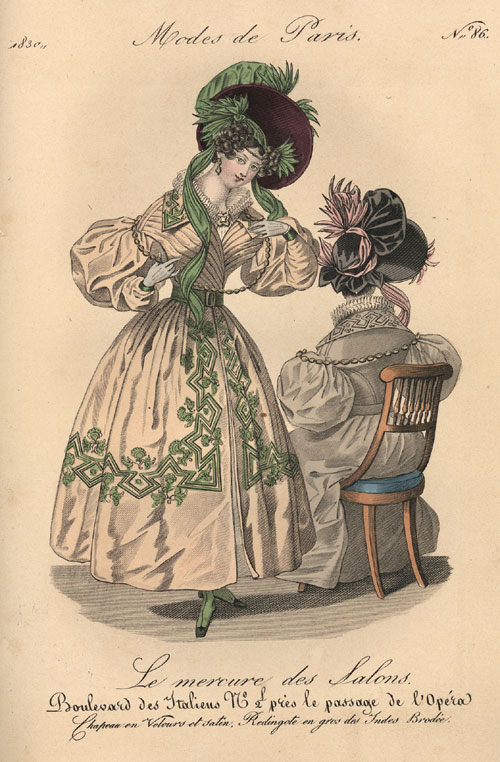
Paris fashion plate from Mercure des Salons (1830)

== Culture ==
=== Literature ===
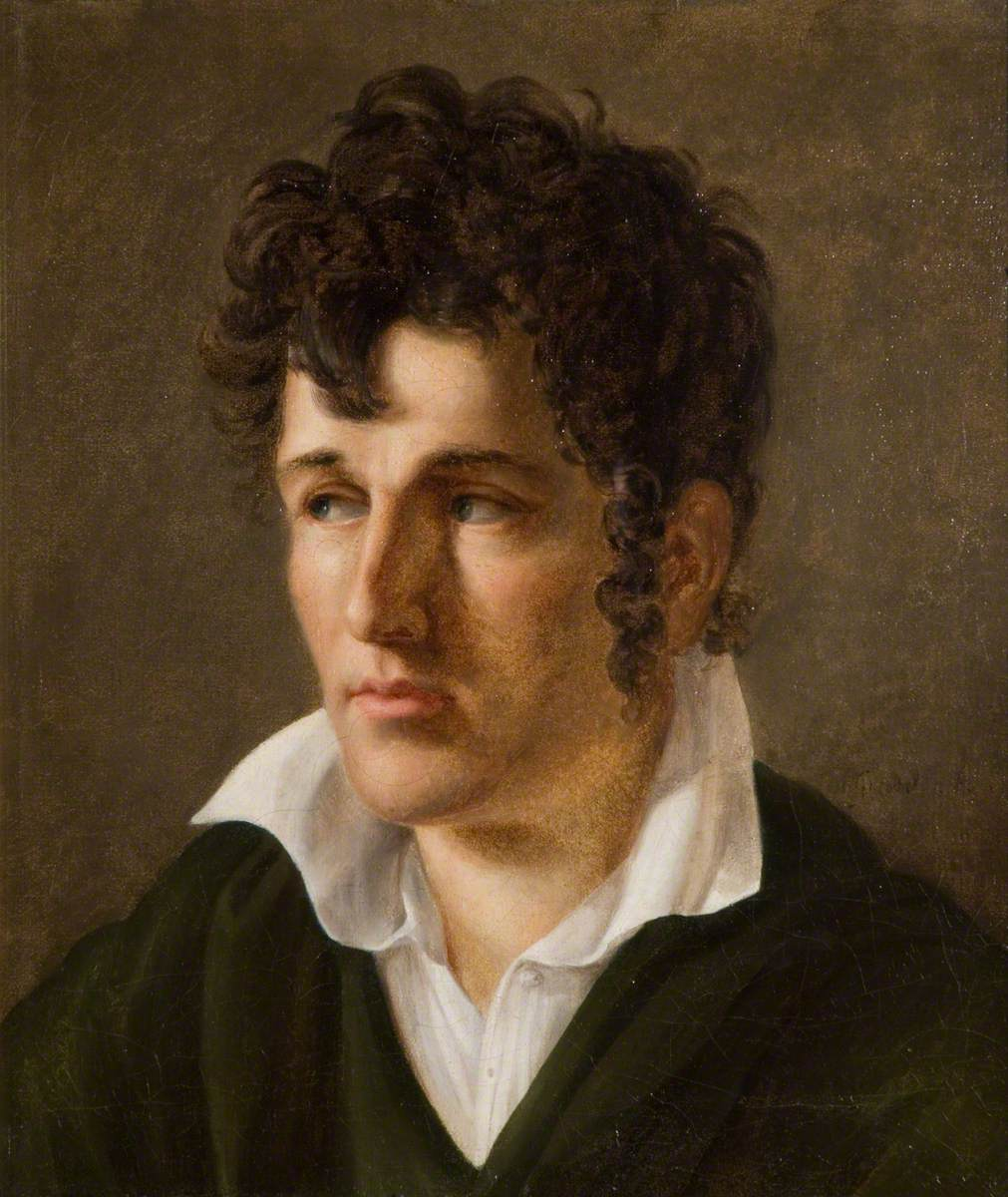
François-René de Chateaubriand

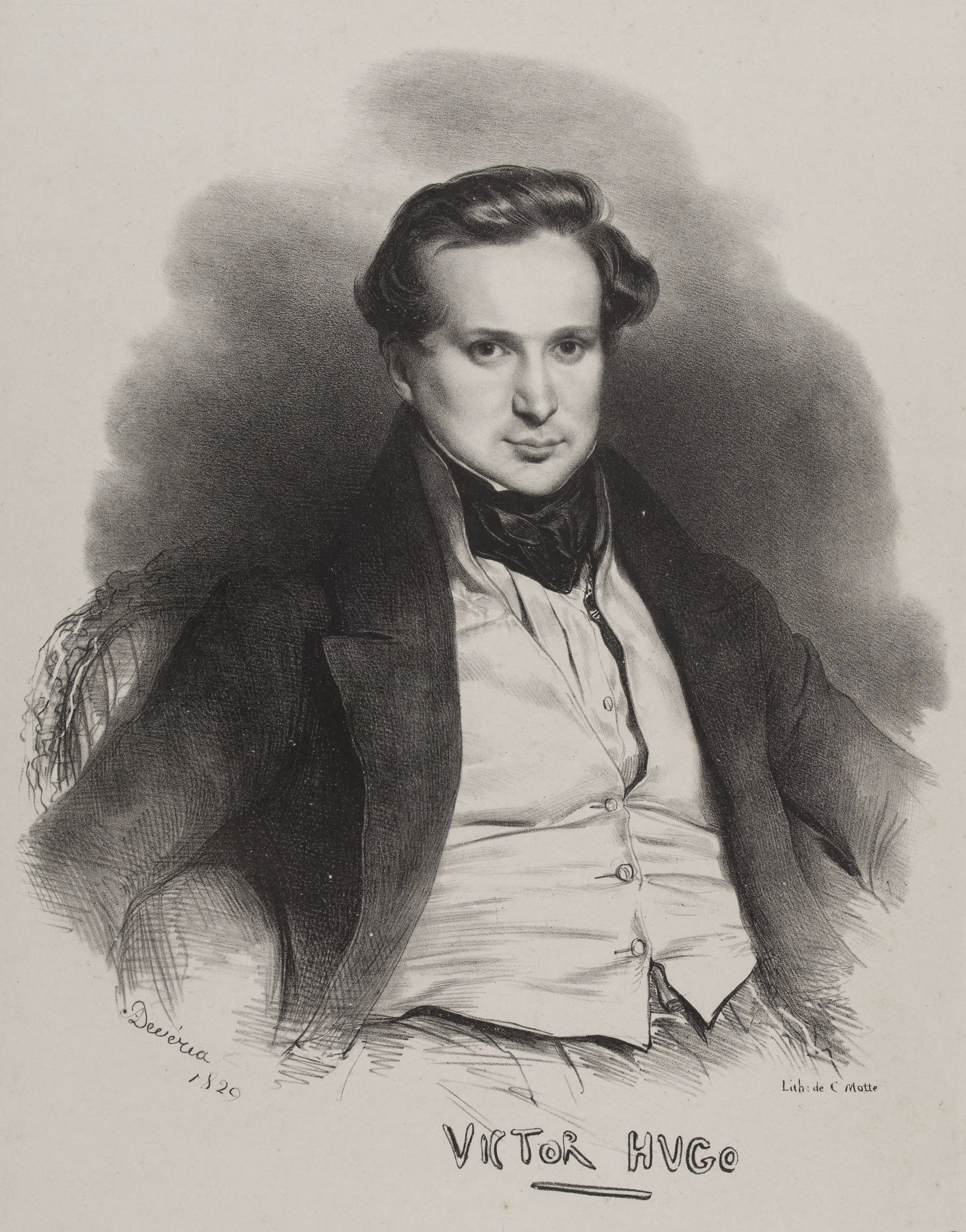
Victor Hugo in 1829

The dominant literary movement in Paris was romanticism, and the most prominent romantic was François-René de Chateaubriand, an essayist and diplomat. He began the Restoration as a committed defender of the Catholic faith and royalist, but gradually moved into the liberal opposition and became a fervent supporter of freedom of speech. The prominent romantics of the time included the poet and politician Alphonse de Lamartine, Gérard de Nerval, Alfred de Musset, Théophile Gautier, and Prosper Mérimée.

Despite limitations on press freedom, the Restoration was an extraordinary rich period for French literature. Paris editors published the first works of some of France's most famous writers. Honoré de Balzac moved to Paris in 1814, studied at the University of Paris, wrote his first play in 1820, and published his first novel, Les Chouans, in 1829. Alexandre Dumas moved to Paris in 1822, and found a position working for the future King, Louis-Philippe, at the Palais-Royal. In 1829, at the age of 27, he published his first play, Henri III and his Courts. Stendhal, a pioneer of literary realism, published his first novel, The Red and the Black, in 1830.

The young Victor Hugo declared that he wanted to be "Chateaubriand or nothing". His first book of poems, published in 1822 when he was twenty years old, earned him a royal prize from Louis XVIII. His second book of poems in 1826 established him as one of France's leading poets. He wrote his first plays, Cromwell and Hernani in 1827 and 1830, and his first short novel, The Last Days of a Condemned Man, in 1829. The premiere of the ultra-romantic Hernani (see theatre section below) caused a riot in the audience.

=== The theatres ===
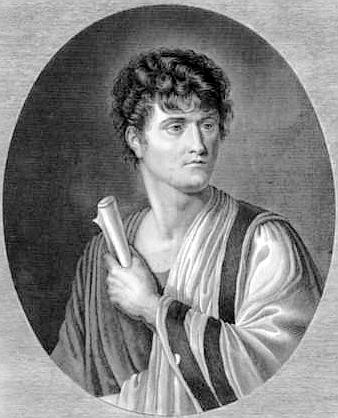
François-Joseph Talma, the most famous Parisian dramatic actor, between 1821 ad 1823

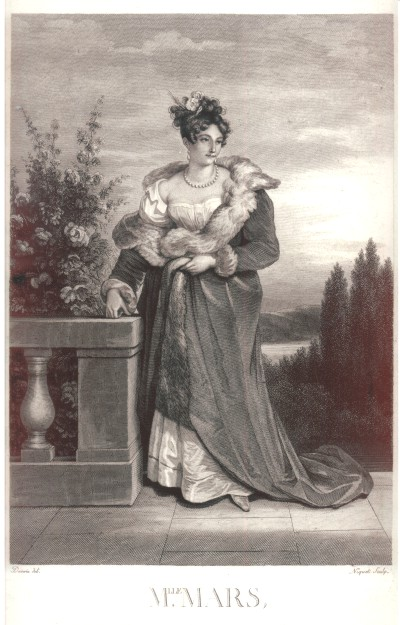
Mademoiselle Mars of the Comédie-Française on stage

Napoleon distrusted the theatres of Paris, fearing that they might ridicule his regime, and had the number reduced to eight. Under the Restoration, the number gradually grew; besides the Opera and the Théâtre Française at the Palais-Royal, the home of the Comédie-Française, there was the Odéon, inaugurated by Marie Antoinette, and famous during the Restoration as a musical theatre, with an orchestra of Italian musicians. It burned in 1818 and was replaced by the present structure, designed by the architect of the Arc de Triomphe, in 1819. Other theatres remaining from the Empire included the Vaudeville, the Variétés, the Ambigu, the Gaieté, and the Opera Buffa. To these were added the Théâtre les Italiens, Théâtre de la Porte-Saint-Martin (1814), and the Gymnase (1820). Most theatres were on the right bank, near the grand boulevards, and this neighborhood became the entertainment district of the city.

The most famous dramatic actor of the period was François-Joseph Talma of the Comédie-Française, who had been a favorite of Napoleon. His version of MacBeth, according to an English visitor who saw it in 1814, his performance had some notable differences from the usual English version. The witches and ghosts in the play never appeared on the stage, since, in Talma's view, they existed only in his imagination; he simply described them to the audience. Mademoiselle George was the most famous female dramatic actress, Abraham-Joseph Bénard, known as Fleury, was the most famous comic actor, and Mademoiselle Mars was the leading comic actress on the Paris stage. The English visitor commented that, while British audiences went to the theatre primarily for relaxation, Paris audiences were much more serious, seeing plays as "matters of serious interest and national concern." .

The most famous theatre premiere of the Restoration was the opening on 25 February 1830 of the play Hernani by the young and little-known author Victor Hugo. The highly-romantic play was considered to have a political message, and the premiere was continually interrupted by shouting, jeering and even fights in the audience. It catapulted Hugo to immediate fame.

=== The Opera and the Conservatory ===
One of the most important musical events of the Restoration was the opening of The Barber of Seville, by Gioachino Rossini, at the Théâtre-Italien in 1818, two years after its premiere in Rome. Rossini made modifications for the French audience, changing it from two to four acts and changing Rosina's part from a contralto to a soprano. This new version premiered at the Odeon Theatre on 6 May 1824, with Rossini present, and remains today the version most used in opera houses around the world.

At the beginning of the Restoration, the Paris Opera was located in the Salle Montansier on rue Richelieu, where the square Louvois is today. On 13 February 1820, the Duke of Berry was assassinated at the door of the opera, and King Louis XVIII, in his grief, had the old theatre demolished. In 1820-21 the opera performed in the Salle Favert of Théâtre des Italiens, then in the sale Louvois on rue Louvois, then, beginning on 16 August 1821, in the new opera house on rue Le Peletier, which was built out of the material of the old opera house. It remained the opera house of Paris until the opening of the Opéra Garnier.

In February 1828, François Habeneck founded the Société des concerts du Conservatoire, with the first concert taking place on 9 March 1828. It became one of the most important concert venues of the city.

=== The Louvre and the Salon ===
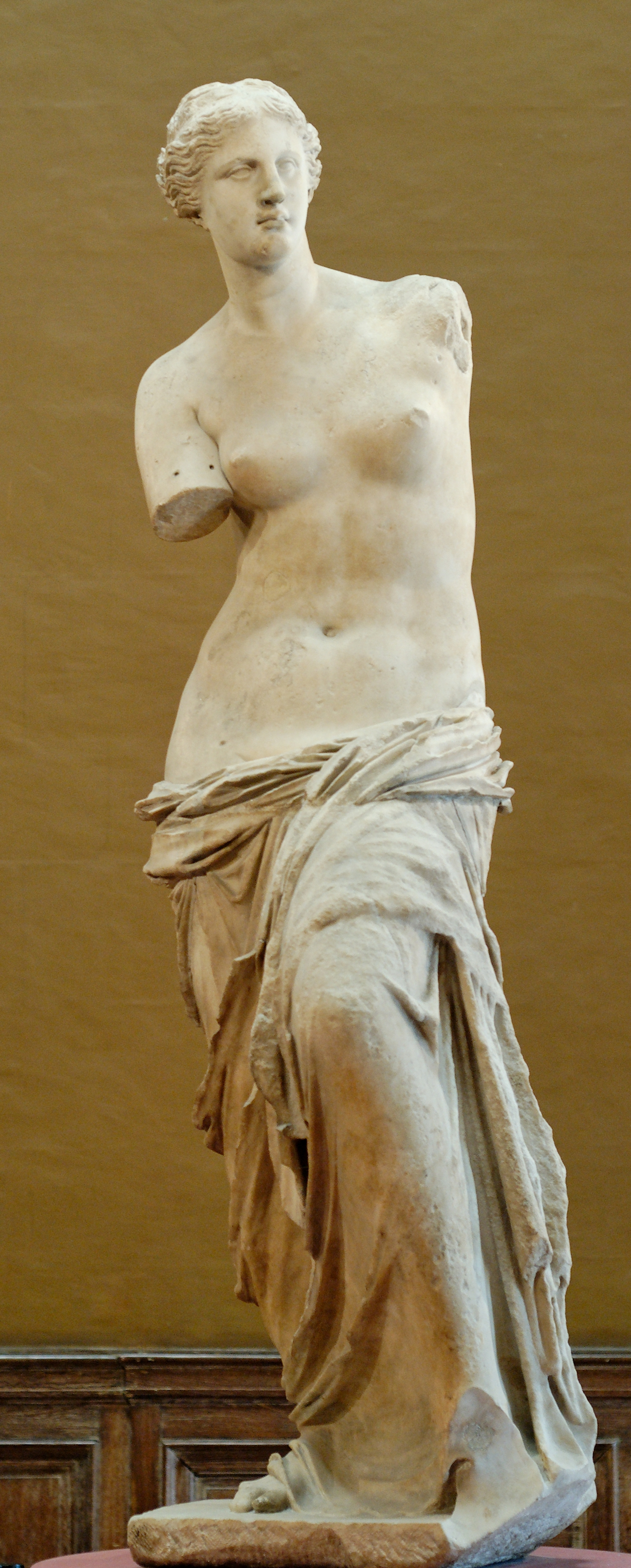
The Venus de Milo entered the Louvre in 1821

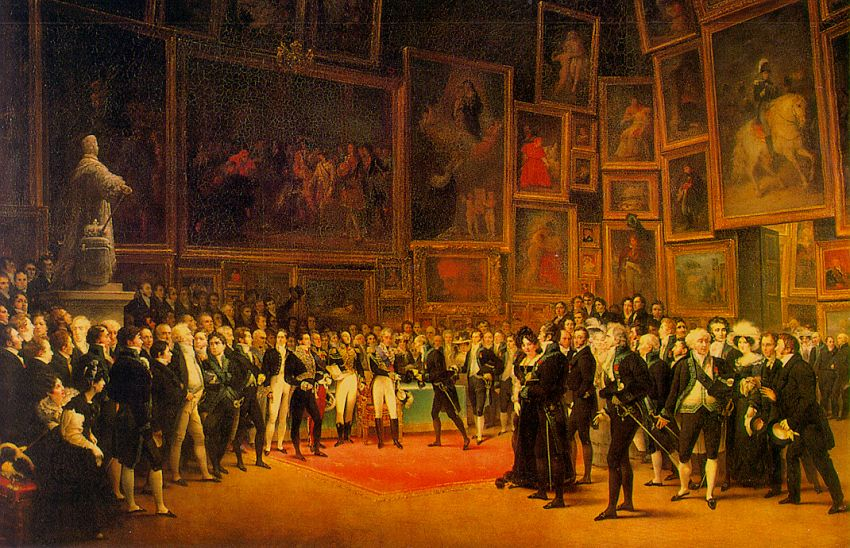
King Charles X presents the prizes to artists at the Paris Salon of 1824 by François Joseph Heim

Napoleon had filled the Louvre with works of art gathered on his campaigns in Italy and other parts of Europe. After his abdication in 1814, the Allies allowed the works to remain in the Louvre, but after his return and final defeat at Waterloo in June 1815, the allies demanded that the works be returned. More than five thousand works of art, among them two thousand paintings, were sent back; the famous bronze horses that had been atop the Arc de Triomphe of the Carrousel went back to their home at Saint Mark's in Venice. The Venus de' Medici, the most famous work of classical sculpture in the museum, was sent back to Florence, but it was soon replaced by a sensational new discovery, the Venus de Milo, acquired from a Greek farmer by a French naval officer, Olivier Voutier, in 1820. It was purchased by the Marquis de Riviére who gave it to Louis XVIII, who promptly gave it to the Louvre. The Louvre also created a department of Egyptian antiquities, curated by Champollion, with more than seven thousand works.

The Musée du Luxembourg had been the first public art gallery in Paris, displaying works from the royal collection, and then a showcase of art by Jacques-Louis David and other painters of the Empire. It re-opened 24 April 1818 as a museum for the work of living artists. Another new gallery, the Musée Dauphin, opened within the Louvre on 27 November 1827.

The dominant style of art gradually changed from neoclassicism to romanticism. Jacques-Louis David was in exile in Brussels, but Antoine Gros, who had painted portraits of Napoleon's court, made a new career painting the portraits of the restored aristocracy. Dominique Ingres also began his career with a portrait of Napoleon, but achieved great success during the Restoration with his precise and realistic classical style. The other major Parisian painters of the period included Anne-Louis Girodet de Roussy-Trioson, Pierre-Paul Prud'hon, and François Gérard. The new generation of painters made their appearance; Théodore Géricault painted one of the most famous works of the romantic period, The Raft of the Medusa, in 1819. In 1822 the young Camille Corot came to Paris and established his studio, and struggled to get his paintings into the Paris Salon. The Salon of 1824 was noted for the growing split between neoclassicism and romanticism, as well as exhibitions by British artists such as John Constable. In 1830, Eugène Delacroix, the leader of the romantic painters, made his most famous painting, Liberty Leading the People, an allegory of the 1830 Revolution, with Notre Dame and Paris buildings in the background. The new French government purchased the painting, but decided it was too inflammatory and never displayed it; it did not go onto public view until after the next Revolution, in 1848.

Art of the Restoration

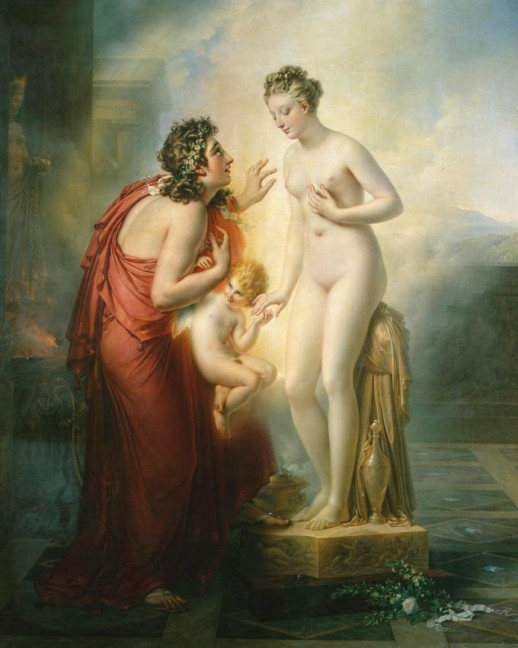
Pygmalion and Galatea, by Girodet (1819)

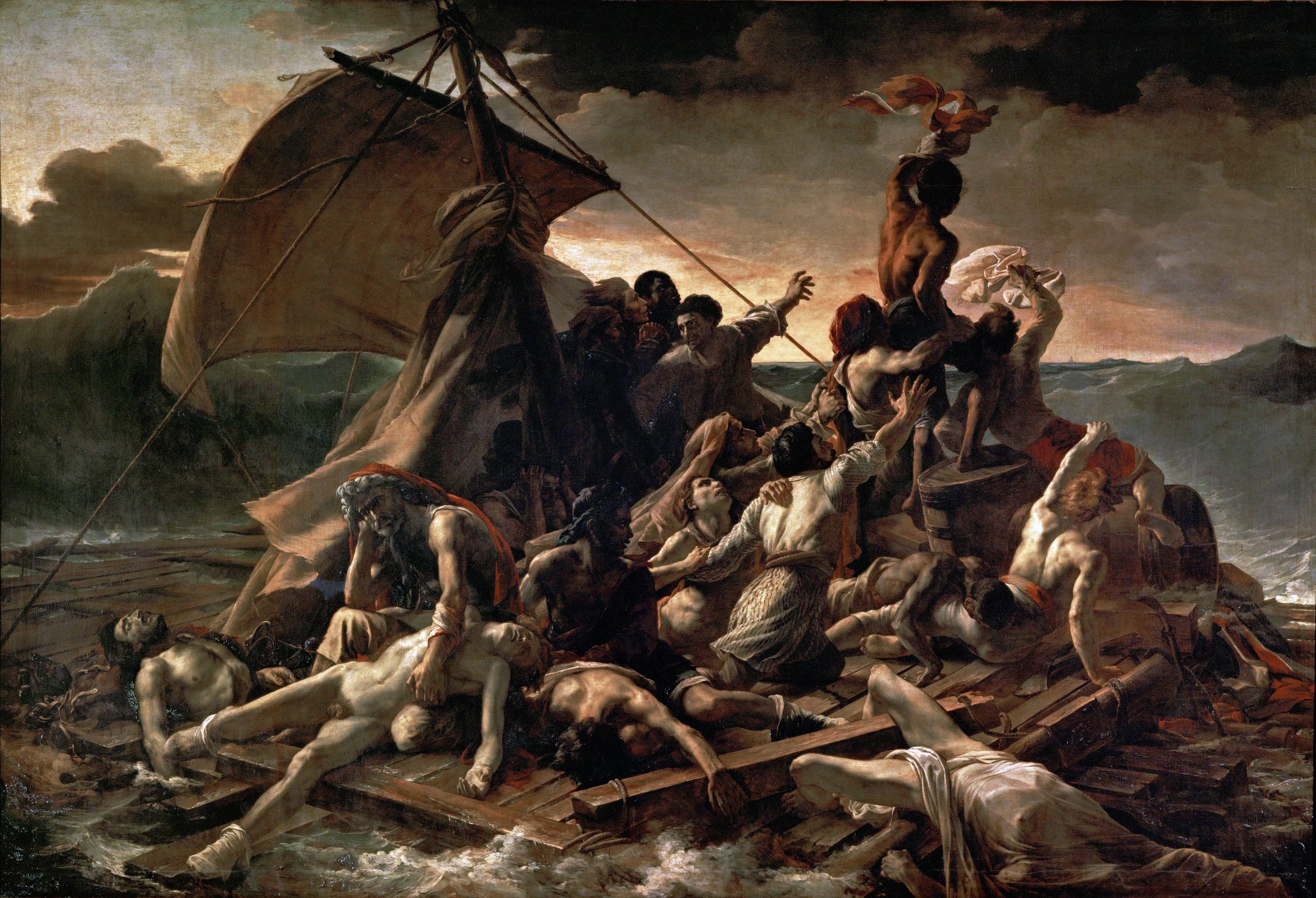
The Raft of the Medusa by Théodore Géricault (1818–1819)

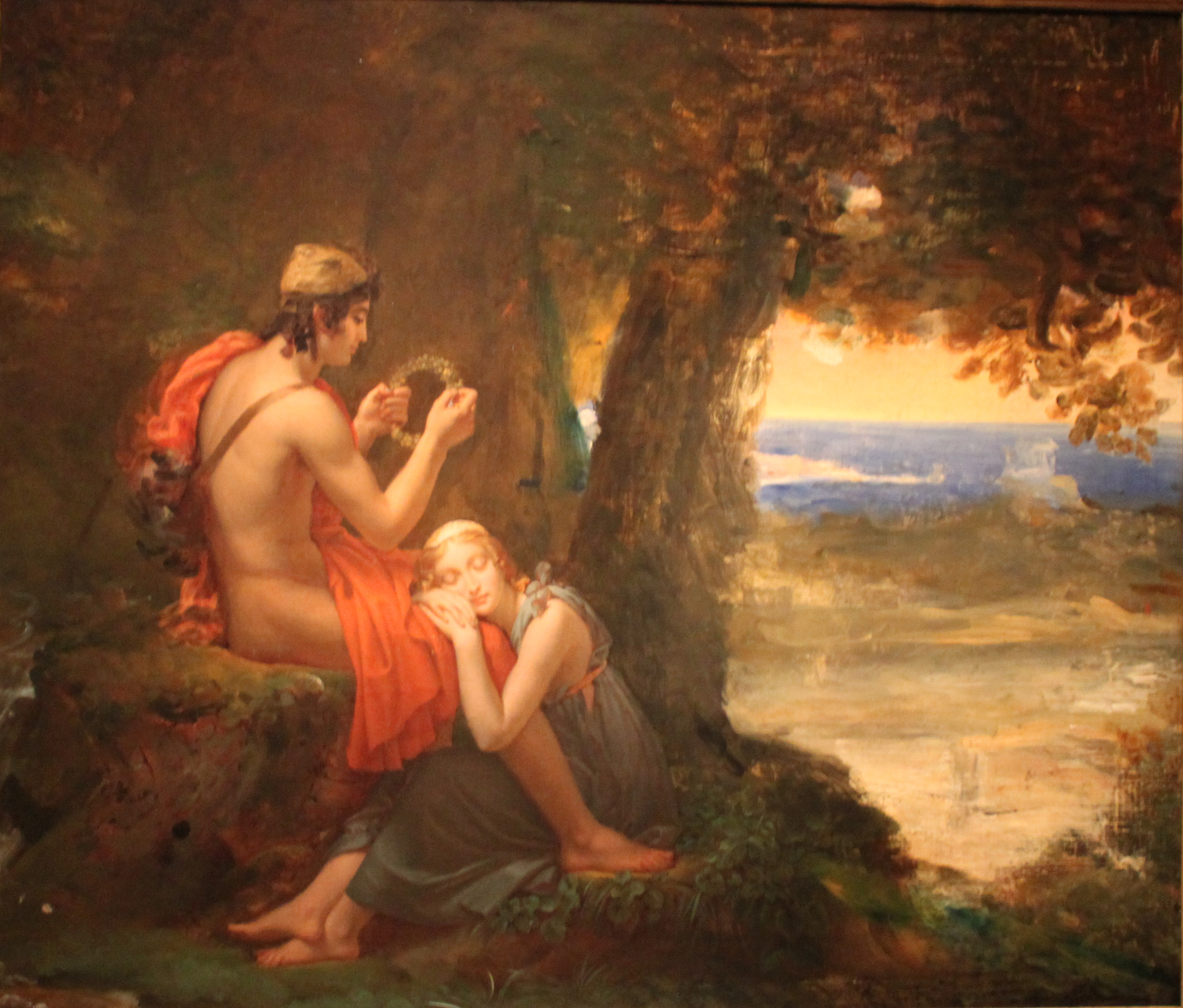
Daphnis and Chloe by François Gérard (1824)

Liberty Leading the People by Eugène Delacroix (1830)

Forest of Fontainebleau by Jean-Baptiste-Camille Corot (1834)

== The Press ==
In 1788, Parisians could read thirty newspapers, of which thirteen were printed outside France. In 1790, in the midst of the Revolution, the number had increased to three hundred and fifty. Napoleon detested the press; newspapers were severely taxed and a controlled, and the number fell thirteen in 1800, and by 1815 to only four. During the Restoration, the number increased dramatically again to one hundred and fifty, of which eight were devoted to politics. By 1827 there were sixteen newspapers devoted to politics, and one hundred sixteen literary publications. The journal Le Figaro first appeared on 16 July 1827; it is the oldest continually published newspaper in the city. Le Temps, another popular paper, began publishing on 15 October 1829.

As readership increased, criticism of the government in the press became louder; the government responded with stricter controls on the press. A law restricting the press was passed on 12 March 1827. In June 1829 the author of an article critical of Charles X was condemned to a five years in prison and a fine of ten thousand francs. On August 10, the director of the newspaper Journal des débats was sentenced to six months in prison and a fine of five hundred francs. On 25 July 1830, the Chamber of Deputies voted a new law suspending freedom of the press. The public outcry against this law was a major cause the evolution of 1830, which began on 27 July.

== The Revolution of 1830 ==
The discontent of the Parisians with Charles X and his government grew steadily. On October 26, 1826, the funeral of the actor François-Joseph Talma turned into a massive demonstration against the government. On 29 April 1827, when the King reviewed the soldiers of the national guard on the Champs Elysées, he was greeted with anti-government slogans shouted by some of the soldiers. He immediately disbanded the national guard. When he named a royalist professor to the College de France against the advice of the Academy of Sciences, student riots broke out in the Latin quarter. In the elections for the Chamber of Deputies in November 1827, the anti-government liberal candidates received 84 percent of the votes of the Parisians. In November 1828, the first barricades went up in the streets of the faubourg Saint-Martin and faubourg Saint-Denis. The army arrived and opened fire; seven persons were killed and twenty wounded.

The King calmed the revolt for a time by naming a more moderate prime minister, Martignac, but in August 1829 he dismissed Martignac and named as the new head of government Jules de Polignac, the son of one of the favorites of Marie-Antoinette and an ultra-royalist. The royalist ministers of the new government further infuriated the Chamber of Deputies; on 2 March 1830, the Chamber voted to refuse any cooperation with the government. The King dissolved the Chamber and ordered new elections. The opposition liberals won an even larger majority against the government; liberal candidates in Paris won four-fifths of the vote. On 26 July 1830 the King and his government responded by suspending the freedom of the press, dissolving the new parliament before it had even met, and raising the changing the election laws so only the richest citizens were allowed to vote.

On 27 July the prefect of police gave the order to seize the printing presses of the opposition newspapers. The first conflicts between the opponents of the government and soldiers, led by Maréchal Marmont, took place around the Palais-Royal. The next day, the 28th, the insurgents surrounded the Hôtel de Ville and erected barricades in the center. Marmont marched his soldiers from the Palais-Royal to the Bastille to clear the barricades there, then back toward the Louvre and the Tuileries. The soldiers were fired upon from the rooftops by the insurgents, and many soldiers abandoned the army and joined the opposition.

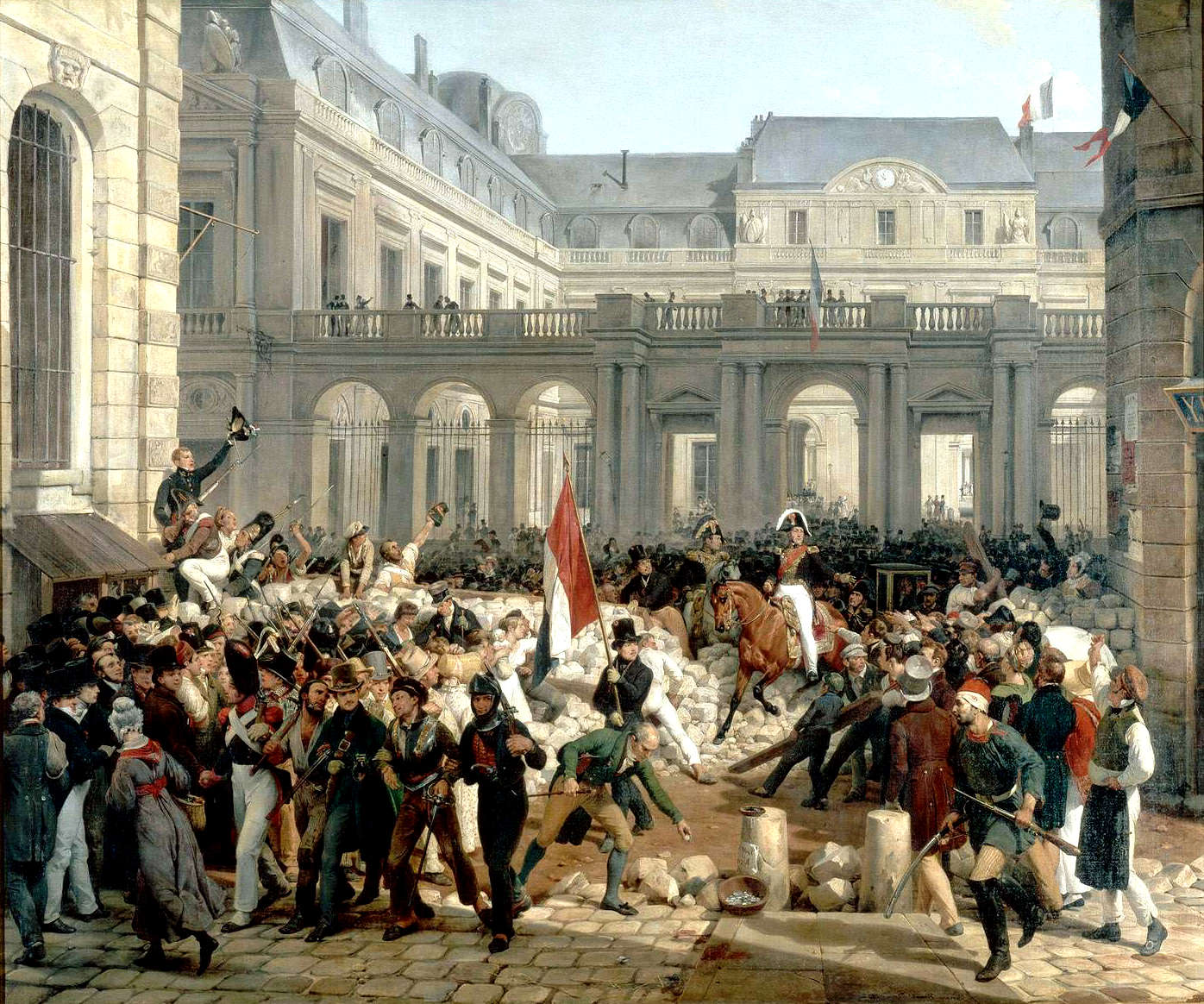
The Duke of Orleans Leaving the Palais-Royal by Horace Vernet. Louis-Philippe going from the Palais-Royal to the Hotel de Ville (July 31, 1830)

The next day the insurgent forces grew in number, joined by several former officers of Napoleon and students of the Ecole Polytechnique. Hundreds of new barricades went up around the city. The insurgents successfully assaulted the Palais Bourbon and the barracks of the Swiss guards on rue de Babylone. Two army regiments on the Place Vendôme defected to the insurgents; To replace them, Marmont pulled his troops out of the Louvre. The insurgents quickly seized the Louvre and drove out the Swiss guards at the Tuileries Palace. Marmont and the regular army soldiers were forced to retreat and regroup on the Champs Elysees.

During the battle within the city, the King was at the chateau of Saint-Cloud, not knowing what to do. In the absence of royal leadership, and eager to avoid another republic and reign of terror, liberal members of the parliament created a provisional government and made their headquarters at the Hotel de Ville. Lafayette was named the commander of the national guard. The deputies invited Louis-Philippe, the Duke of Orleans, to become the leader of a constitutional monarchy. On the 30th the Duke agreed and returned from his chateau at Raincy to the Palais-Royal. He was escorted by Lafayette and the members of the government to the Hotel de Ville, where the crowd received him with little enthusiasm, but the new regime was officially launched. Charles X departed Saint-Cloud for Normandy, and on 16 August sailed for England, where he went into exile.

== Chronology ==
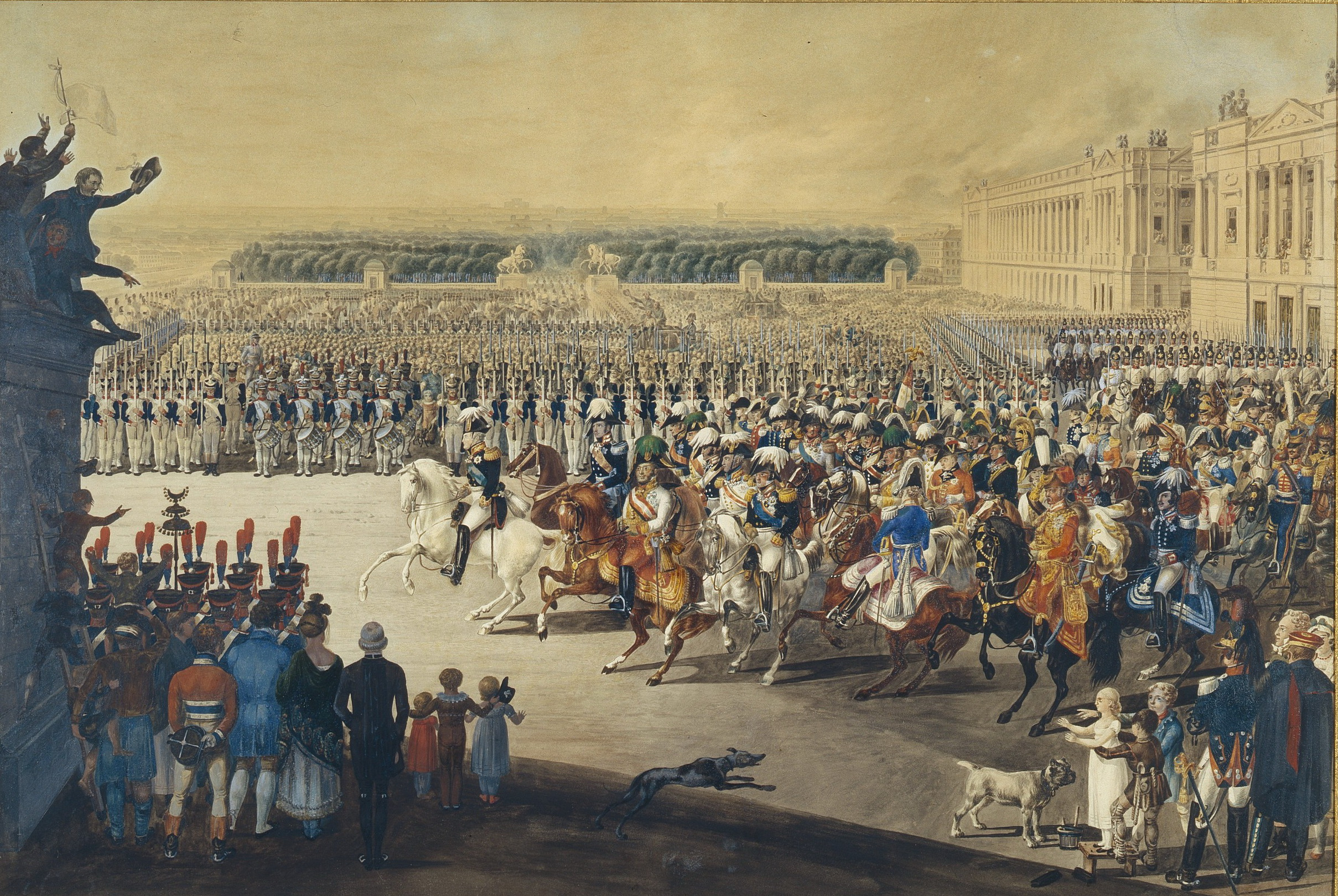
The allied armies parade on the Place de la Concorde (1814)

- 1814 – Allied armies occupy Paris on March 31, followed by the entry of Louis XVIII on 3 May.
- 1815
  - 19 March – At midnight, Louis XVIII flees the Tuileries Palace. At midnight March 20, Napoleon occupies the Palace.
  - 22 June – The second abdication of Napoleon, after the Battle of Waterloo.
  - 6 July – Allied troops again occupy Paris, followed by Louis XVIII on July 8.
- 1816
  - 21 March – Reopening of the French academies, purged of twenty-two members named by Napoleon.
  - December – first illumination by gaslight of a café in the Passage des Panoramas.
- 1817 – Population: 714,000
  - 1 June – Opening of the Marché Saint-Germain.
  - 8 July – Opening of the first promenades aériennes, or roller coaster, in the jardin Beaujon.
- 1818 – New statue of Henry IV placed on the Pont Neuf, to replace the original statue destroyed during the Revolution.
  - The Draisienne, ancestor of the bicycle, is introduced in the Luxembourg Gardens. (1818)
- 1820
  - March 8 – First stone laid for the École des Beaux-Arts.
  - First student demonstrations against the royal government.
  - December 20 – Académie royale de Médecine (now the Académie nationale de Médecine) founded by royal ordinance.
- 1821
  - 14 May 1821 – Opening of the canal of Saint-Denis.
  - 23 July – Founding of the Geographic Society of Paris.
  - 26 December – Decree to return the Pantheon to a church, under its previous name of Sainte-Geneviève.
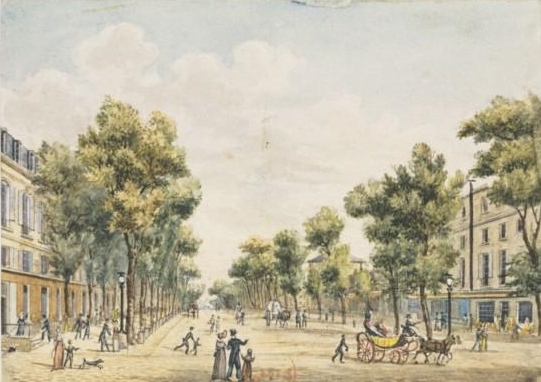
    Boulevard Montmartre in 1822
- 1822
  - 7–8 March – Demonstrations at the law school, two hundred students arrested.
  - 15 July – the Café de Paris opens at corner of the boulevard des Italiens and rue Taitbout.
- 1823
  - 5 August – First stone laid for the church of Notre-Dame-de-Lorette.
- 1824
  - 25 August – First stone laid for the church of Saint-Vincent-de-Paul.
  - October – Opening of À la Belle Jardinière clothing store, ancestor of the modern department store.
  - 13 December – La Fille d'honneur on rue de la Monnaie is the first store to put price tags on merchandise.
- 1826
  - First steamboat service begins between Paris and Saint-Cloud.
  - Hachette publishing house founded.
  - 16 July – The founding of Le Figaro newspaper.
  - 4 November – the new Paris Bourse opens.
- 1827
  - 12 March – New law passed restricting freedom of the press.
  - 30 March – Students demonstrate during funeral of François Alexandre Frédéric, duc de la Rochefoucauld-Liancourt. His coffin is smashed during the struggle.
  - 29 April – During review of the Paris National Guard by King Charles X, the soldiers greet him with anti-government slogans. The King dissolves the National Guard.
  - 30 June – A giraffe, a gift of the Pasha of Egypt to Charles X, and the first ever seen in Paris, is put on display in the Jardin des Plantes.
  - 19–20 November – political demonstrations around the legislative elections; street barricades go up in the Saint-Denis and Saint-Martin neighborhoods.
- 1828
  - February – Concert Society of the Paris Conservatory founded. The first concert took place on 9 March.
  - 11 April – Introduction of service by the omnibus, carrying 18 to 25 passengers. Fare was 25 centimes.
- 1829
  - 1 January – The rue de la Paix becomes the first street in Paris lit by gaslight.
  - 12 March – Creation of the sergents de ville, the first uniformed Paris police force. Originally one hundred in number, they were mostly former army sergeants. They carried a cane during the day, and a sword at night.

== See also ==
- History of Paris
- Paris in the Middle Ages
- Paris in the 18th century
- Paris under Napoleon
- Paris under Louis-Philippe
- Paris during the Second Empire
