= Jacques-Alphonse Mahul =

French columnist and politician (1795–1871)

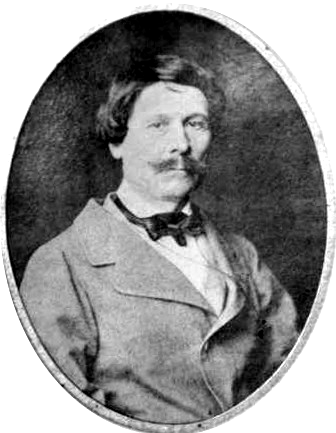
- Born: François-Antoine-Eugène de Planard; 31 July 1795; Carcassonne (Aude)
- Died: 25 August 1871 (aged 76); Villardonnel (Aude)
- Occupation: Politician

Jacques-Alphonse Mahul (31 July 1795 - 25 August 1871) was a French columnist and politician. A liberal activist, he was affiliated with the Carbonari, and was imprisoned for some time at La Force Prison. He participated in the editing of many liberal newspapers such as the Revue encyclopédique.

== Biography ==
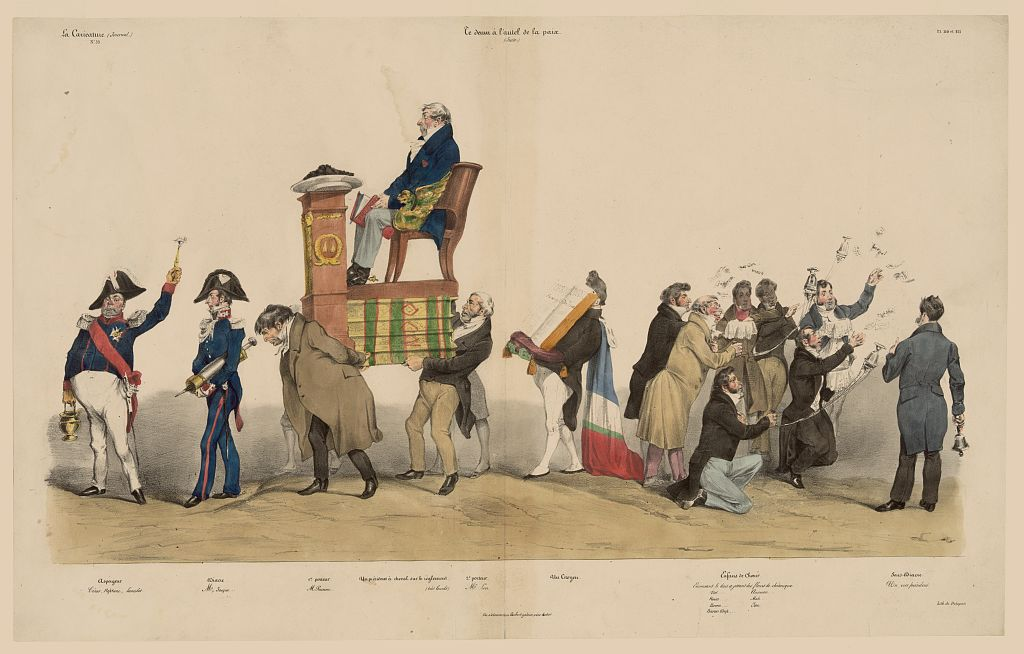
Te deum à l'autel de la paix Drawing by Grandville published in La Caricature in November 1831 From left to right: The sparger, general Georges Mouton; the deacon, general Jean-François Jacqueminot; a president straddling regulation, Amédée Girod de l'Ain; 1st carrier, Clément-François-Victor-Gabriel Prunelle; 2nd carrier, François Benjamin Levrault; a citizen, King Louis Philippe I, his face hidden by a book; the choir boys, Jean Vatout, Auguste Hilarion de Kératry, Alphonse-Marie-Marcellin-Thomas Bérenger, Antoine Gabriel Jars, Alphonse Jacques Mahul, Hippolyte Ganneron; the subdeacon.

Jacques-Alphonse Mahul was Master of Requests at the Conseil d'État (1835), prefect of Haute-Loire (1835-1837), then of Vaucluse (1837-1840) and of Haute-Garonne (1841), general director of the police (1840). He was deputy of the Aude from 1831 to 1834 and from 1846 to 1848, serving in the majority supporting the July Monarchy.

== Works ==
- Notice sur quelques articles négligés dans tous les dictionnaires historiques, Paris : Mme Hérissant le Doux, 1818, 34 p.
- Annuaire nécrologique, ou Supplément annuel et continuation de toutes les biographies ou dictionnaires historiques, Paris: Baudouin frères, 5 annuaires de 1821 à 1826. The third year, 1822, is available on line. Paris : Ponthieu, 1823 .
- Histoire de la loi des élections et des projets du gouvernement, Paris : Baudouin frères, 1820, in-8°, 55 p.
- Des Partis en France et dans la Chambre des Députés pendant la session de 1822, Paris : Pélicier, 1822, in-8°, 40 p.
- Tactique électorale à l'usage de l'opposition, où sont indiqués et développés tous les moyens légaux de diriger et concentrer les forces de l'opposition dans les collèges électoraux, et faire triompher son candidat, Paris : Brissot-Thivars, 1822, in-8°, 44 p.
- Du Silence considéré comme tactique parlementaire, Paris : impr. de Boucher, 1823, in-8°, 15 p.
- Éclaircissements touchant les motifs et les circonstances de la détention de M. Alphonse Mahul; suivis d'observations sur les prisons de la Force et de la Conciergerie, Paris : Ponthieu, 1823, in-8°, 118 p.
- Instructions électorales à l'usage des Français constitutionnels, où sont indiqués et développés tous les moyens légaux de diriger et concentrer les forces de l'opposition dans les collèges électoraux, et de faire triompher son candidat, Paris : Ponthieu, 1824, in-8°, 44 p.
- Explications de M. Mahul, ex-préfet de la Haute-Garonne, sur les derniers événements de Toulouse, Paris : F. Didot frères, (s.d.), in-4°, 4 p.
- Cartulaire et archives des communes de l'ancien diocèse et de l'arrondissement administratif de Carcassonne — villes, villages, églises, abbayes, prieurés, châteaux, seigneuries, fiefs, généalogies, blasons, métairies, lieux bâtis, quartiers ruraux, notes statistiques, 8 vol. (avec fig., pl. et cartes; le 6e volume contient 2 parties en 2 tomes), Paris : Didron et Dumoulin, 1857-1882.

== See also ==
=== Bibliography ===
- "Jacques-Alphonse Mahul", in Adolphe Robert and Gaston Cougny, Dictionnaire des parlementaires français (1789–1891), Bourloton, Paris, 1889 Edition details Wikisource

=== External links ===
- LADEPECHE.fr : Un érudit en politique : Jacques- Alphonse Mahul (1795-1871)
- Assemblée nationale : Base de données des députés français depuis 1789 : Jacques, Alphonse MAHUL (1795 - 1871)
