= François Benjamin Levrault =

French politician

- Born: 7 August 1774; Barbezieux-Saint-Hilaire (Charente)
- Died: 3 October 1855 (aged 81); Paris
- Occupation: Politician

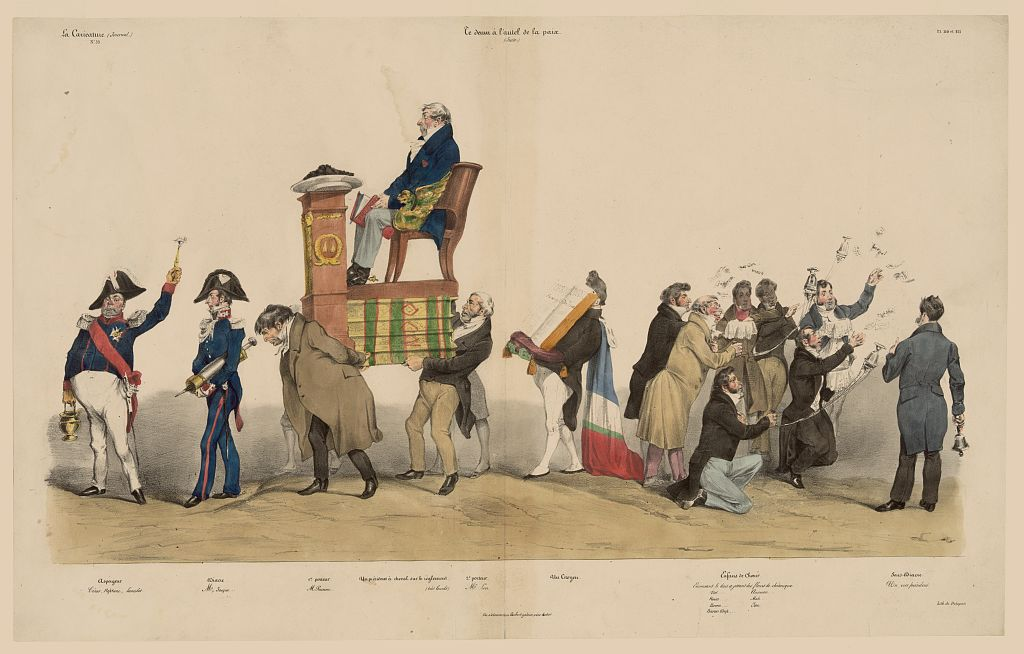
« Te deum à l'autel de la paix » Drawing by Grandville published in La Caricature in November 1831 From left to right: The sparger, general Georges Mouton; the deacon, general Jean-François Jacqueminot; a president straddling regulation, Amédée Girod de l'Ain; 1st carrier, Clément-François-Victor-Gabriel Prunelle; 2nd carrier, François Benjamin Levrault; a citizen, King Louis Philippe I, his face hidden by a book; the choir boys, Jean Vatout, Auguste Hilarion de Kératry, Alphonse-Marie-Marcellin-Thomas Bérenger, Antoine Gabriel Jars, Alphonse Jacques Mahul, Hippolyte Ganneron; the subdeacon.

François Benjamin Levrault (7 August 1774 - 3 October 1855) was a French politician, medical doctor, and deputy for the Charente department from 1831 to 1834, serving in the majority supporting the ministries of the July Monarchy.

== Sources ==
- "François Benjamin Levrault", in Adolphe Robert and Gaston Cougny, Dictionnaire des parlementaires français (1789–1891), Bourloton, Paris, 1889 Edition details Wikisource
