= Economy of Paris =

Headquarters of TotalEnergies, France's largest company, in Courbevoie, in the La Defense business district

The economy of Paris is based largely on services and commerce: of the 390,480 of its enterprises, 80.6 percent are engaged in commerce, transportation, and diverse services, 6.5 percent in construction, and just 3.8 percent in industry. Paris, including both the City of Paris and the Île-de-France region (Paris Region), is the most important center of economic activity in France, accounting for about thirty percent of the French GDP.

Paris had the fifth largest metropolitan economy in the world in 2011 according to the Brookings Institution and second in Europe. The Paris Region is Europe's second richest region with a GDP (PPP) at over $1 trillion equivalent to that of the Netherlands or Indonesia and higher than countries like Switzerland, Sweden or Saudi Arabia and United Arab Emirates combined, ahead of North Rhine-Westphalia in Germany but slightly behind Greater London in the United Kingdom. It has the highest per capita GDP of any French region and the third highest of any region in the European Union.

The story is similar in the Paris Region, or Île-de-France, as a whole. 76.7 percent of enterprises are engaged in commerce and services, and 3.4 percent in industry. 59.5 percent of employees in the region are engaged in commerce, transport and diverse services, 26.9 percent in public administration, health and social services, 8.2 percent industry, and 5.2 percent in construction.

The top ten French companies listed in the Fortune Global 500 for 2015 all had their headquarters in the Paris Region, nine within the City of Paris and one, TotalEnergies, in the Hauts-de-Seine Department, in the business district of La Defense. The fourth-largest company, Société Générale, has its registered headquarters in Paris and its operational offices in La Defense. Other notable clusters of major companies are located at Issy-les-Moulineaux (media companies); Boulogne-Billancourt, and Saint-Denis.

== GDP ==
Paris metropolitan area produced US$1.03 trillion at market exchange rates or around 1/3 of the economy of France in 2024 The GDP per capita of the region was €65,200 (US$73,000), the highest in France. The GDP of the Paris Region accounted for 31 percent of the GDP of Metropolitan France.

In 2022 the GDP of the Paris Region was the second largest in Europe, ahead of North Rhine-Westphalia in Germany and behind Greater London in the United Kingdom. The GDP per inhabitant was the 4th highest in Europe, after Luxembourg, Brussels, and Hamburg.

The Paris Regional GDP grew steadily by an average of 2.3 percent a year between 1993 and 2007. However, during the recession of 2009, the GDP declined sharply by 4.9 percent, before recovering and growing again.

The Paris Regional economy is largely a tertiary, or services, economy. The tertiary sector, including business and financial services, government, education, and health, accounted for 90 percent of the value added, placing the Paris Region just behind Greater London and Brussels. The value added by industry dropped from 12 percent in 2000 to 8 percent in 2011.

Official estimations ranked the Paris Region by GDP as the 5th-largest urban economy in the world, after Tokyo, New York, Los Angeles and Seoul:

| City | Official est. Nominal GDP ($BN) |
|---|---|
| 1. Tokyo | 1,900 (2007) |
| 2. New York | 1,559 (2014) |
| 3. London | 1,212 (2014) |
| 4. Los Angeles | 867 (2014) |
| 5. Seoul | 688 (2014) |
| 6. Paris | 688 (2013) |
| 7. Chicago | 611 (2014) |
| 8. Houston | 525 (2014) |
| 9. Dallas-Fort Worth-Arlington | 504 (2014) |
| 10. São Paulo | 477 (2011) |

(See List of cities by GDP for more figures.)

== Fortune Global 500 companies ==
In 2015, the Paris Region hosted the world headquarters of 29 of the 31 French companies listed in the Fortune Global 500, the 500 largest corporations in the world by revenue. The top twelve French companies listed in the Fortune Global 500 for 2015 all have their headquarters in the Paris Region in either the city or the suburbs.

Top twelve Fortune Global 500 companies headquartered in the Paris Region (2015)
| Local rank | FG 500 rank | Company name | Industry | Revenues ($ millions, 2014) | Location |
|---|---|---|---|---|---|
| 1 | 11 | TotalEnergies | Petroleum refining | 212,108 | Courbevoie (La Défense) |
| 2 | 20 | Axa | Insurance: Life, health (stock) | 162,762 | 8th arrondissement |
| 3 | 42 | BNP Paribas | Banks: Commercial and savings | 124,333 | 9th arrondissement |
| 4 | 49 | Société Générale | Banks: Commercial and savings | 118,232 | 9th arrondissement |
| 5 | 58 | Crédit Agricole | Banks: Commercial and savings | 106,198 | La Defense |
| 6 | 64 | Carrefour | Food and drug stores | 101,238 | Boulogne-Billancourt |
| 7 | 73 | Engie | Energy | 99,073 | Nanterre (La Defense) |
| 8 | 78 | EDF | Utilities (electricity) | 96,669 | 8th arrondissement |
| 9 | 128 | Peugeot | Motor vehicles and parts | 71,111 | 16th arrondissement |
| 10 | 134 | BPCE | Banks: Commercials and savings | 68,986 | 13th arrondissement |
| 11 | 148 | Finatis (Groupe Casino) | Food and drug stores | 65,222 | 15th arrondissement |
| 12 | 166 | CNP Assurances | Insurance: Life, health (stock) | 59,648 | 15th arrondissement |
Note: The Franco-German aerospace company EADS has its dual world headquarters in Paris and Munich but it is not listed here because Fortune magazine considered it was located in the Netherlands, where it was legally incorporated for tax reasons.

== Paris Region employment by sector ==
The economy of both Paris and the Paris Region is primarily a service economy. The part of industry in the Paris Region economy has been steadily shrinking; the number of industrial employees dropped from 532,539, or 9.6 percent of the working population, in 2007 to 463,201, or 8.2 percent, in 2012. Employment in the Paris Regional economy, like that of the economy of the City of Paris, is overwhelming in commerce, services, transport, public administration, education, health and social welfare.

Employment in Paris Region by sector in 2012 (source: INSEE)
| Sector | Employees | % |
| Agriculture | 0.2% | |
| Industry | 8.2% | |
| Construction | 5.2% | |
| Commerce, transport, services | 59.5% | |
| Administration, education, health, social services | 26.0% | |

The picture is very similar in the City of Paris itself, where commerce, services and government account for more than ninety percent of employment in 2012.

Employment in City of Paris by sector in 2012 (source: INSEE)
| Sector | Employees | % |
| Agriculture | 0.1% | |
| Industry | 4.4% | |
| Construction | 3.1% | |
| Commerce, transport, services | 68.0% | |
| Administration, education, health, social services | 24.4% | |

== Employment by business districts ==
The Paris Region had 5.4 million salaried employees in 2010, of whom 2.2 million were concentrated in 39 pôles d'emplois or business districts. The largest of these, in terms of number of employees, is known in French as the QCA, or quartier central des affaires; it is in the western part of the City of Paris, in the 2nd, 8th, 9th, 16th and 18th arrondissements. In 2010 it was the workplace of 500,000 salaried employees, about thirty percent of the salaried employees in Paris and ten percent of those in the Île-de-France. The largest sectors of activity in the central business district were finance and insurance (16 percent of employees in the district) and business services (15 percent). The district also includes a large concentration of department stores, shopping areas, hotels and restaurants, as well a government offices and ministries.

The second-largest business district in terms of employment is La Défense, just west of the city, where many companies installed their offices in the 1990s. In 2010 it was the workplace of 144,600 employees, of whom 38 percent worked in finance and insurance, 16 percent in business support services. Two other important districts, Neuilly-sur-Seine and Levallois-Perret, are extensions of the Paris business district and of La Defense. Another district, including Boulogne-Billancourt, Issy-les-Moulineaux and the southern part of the 15th arrondissement, is a center of activity for the media and information technology.

Six of the twelve largest companies in the Paris Region are banks and insurance companies. The largest banks, in order of 2014 revenue, are BNP Paribas; Société Générale; Credit Agricole, and Groupe BPCE. The largest insurance companies are AXA (the second largest French company, by revenue, in 2014) and CNP Assurances.

A 2015 survey ranking banks around the world by assets ranked BNP Paribas the 7th largest bank in the world; Credit Agricole in tenth place, and Societe Generale in 20th place.

French banks have traditionally had their main offices in the center of Paris, not far from the Opera and the Banque de France, the French central bank. The headquarters of BNP Paribas is in the 9th arrondissement on rue Burger

has its registered main office on Boulevard Haussmann in the 9th arrondissement, but has its operational headquarters in Nanterre, in La Defense. Credit Agricole has its main office in Montrouge in the southern Paris suburbs. BPCE has its main office on Avenue Pierre Mendès in the 1st arrondissement.

=== Automobiles ===
Paris was the birthplace of the French automobile industry, and in 2014 France was the 13th largest automobile manufacturer in the world by unit production, and the third-largest in Europe, after Germany and Spain. Paris is home to two major auto-manufacturing firms; PSA Group, which owns the Peugeot and Citroën brands, and Renault, which owns both the Renault brand and Dacia of Romania, Renault Samsung Motors of South Korea, and 43 percent of Nissan. The headquarters of Renault is in Boulogne-Billancourt, in the Paris Region, where for decades the company had a huge assembly plant, now closed. Renault Trucks is a major producer of commercial vehicles and is owned by Volvo. In 2015 the French government increased its share of ownership in Renault to 19.73 percent, in order to have more control over the social policy of the company. In 2012 PSA Group was the second-largest automobile manufacturer in Europe, and the ninth-largest in the world, with 2.9 million units. In 2009 it had been the 6th largest automobile manufacturer. The headquarters of the company is in the 16th arrondissement of Paris. A large part of the automobiles of both companies are made outside France.

=== Energy ===
TotalEnergies, one of the five largest enterprises in France by revenue, and the 14th largest company in the 2015 Fortune Global 500. Total operates in 130 countries around the world, Its headquarters is located in Courbevoie, in the business district of La Defense.

Engie is the second-largest energy company in France and in the Paris Region. Formerly known before April 2015 as GDF-Suez, it is a multinational electric utility company, involved in electric generation and distribution, natural gas and renewable energy. It was founded in 1858 as the Universal Suez Canal Company, to build the Suez Canal. It purchased the solar power electricity producer Solairedirect in 2015, making it the largest provider in France. Its headquarters is located in Courbevoie, in the business district of La Defense. According to the Fortune Global 500 in 2015, it is the 7th largest company in France by revenue, and the 73rd in the world.

Électricité de France, or EDF, is the 8th largest French company by revenue and the 78th in the 2015 Global 500. Mostly owned by French government, the company operates 58 nuclear reactors located on twenty sites around France. The headquarters is at 22-30 Avenue Wagram in the 8th arrondissement in Paris, while it also has a large office building in Courbevoie in the La Defense business district.

=== Food and drugstores ===
Paris hosts the headquarters of Carrefour S.A., the largest food and drug store chain in France, and fourth in the world according to the 2015 Fortune Global 500, after Wal-Mart and Costco in the U.S. and Tesco in Britain. Carrefour is a multinational company with 1,452 hypermarkets at the end of 2011. It ranked 64t in the Fortune 500. The headquarters is located in Boulogne-Billancourt, in the Paris suburbs.

The second-largest French chain, Auchan, is in Croix, in northern France, but the third, Finatis, or Groupe Casino, is headquartered in the Paris Region. It ranked 148 in the Fortune Global 500 in 2015.

=== Luxury goods, fashion and cosmetics ===
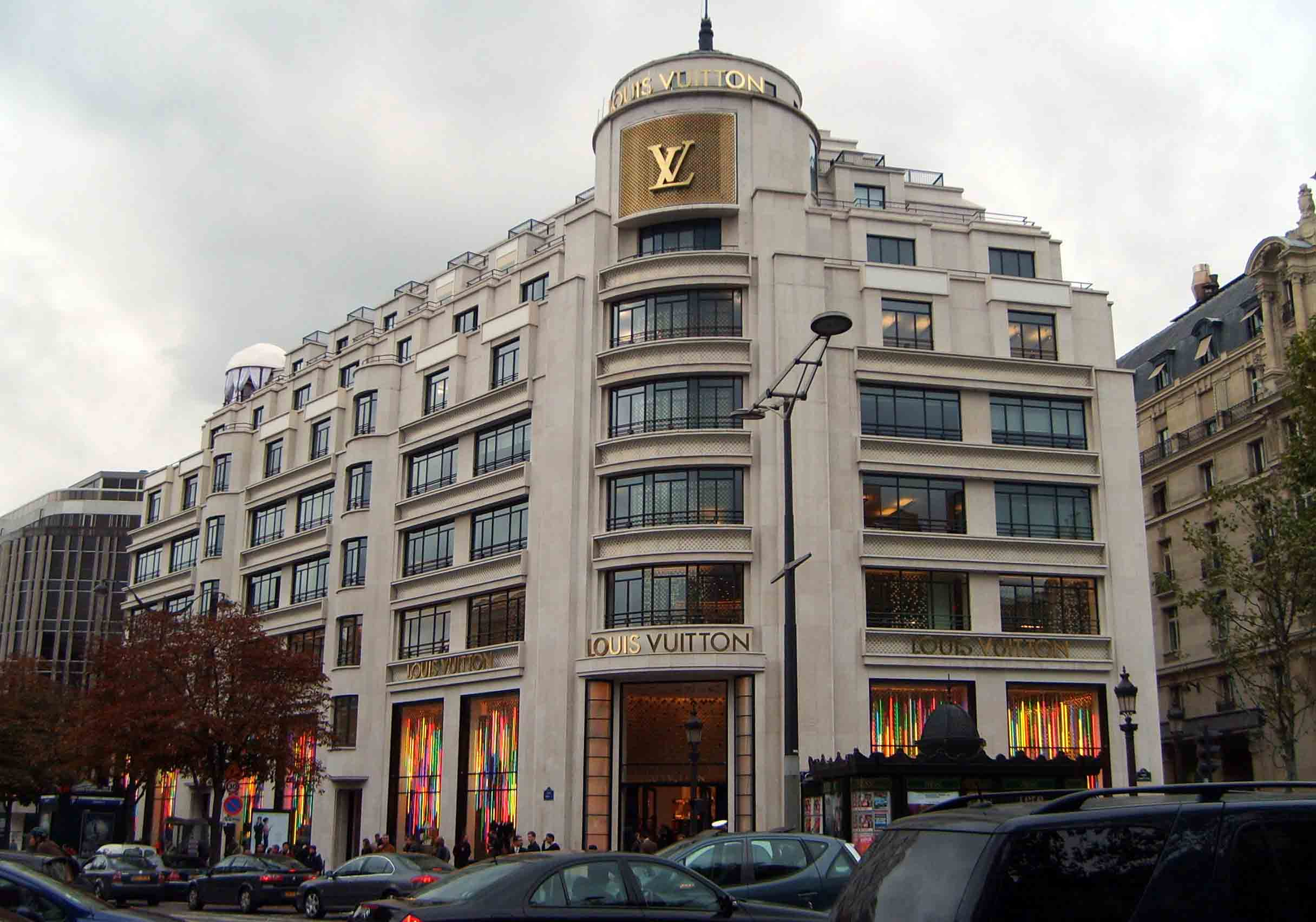
Louis Vuitton boutique on the Champs-Élysées

Paris has a long history, dating back to the Middle Ages, of producing luxury goods for the aristocracy and the wealthy. Today the most important luxury goods firm in Paris is LVMH, headed by Bernard Arnault, who also heads Christian Dior S.A., a major international fashion company, which has its headquarters at 30 Avenue Montaigne in the 8th arrondissement. Dior holds 42.36 percent of the stock of LVMH and 59.01 percent of the voting rights in LVMH. The LVMH group includes Louis Vuitton and the champagne maker Moët Hennessy, which merged in 1987. LVMH has sixty subsidiaries, including Bulgari, the cosmetics store Sephora, and the department stores Bon Marché and Samaritaine. The products of the group include ready-to-wear, fashion accessories, footwear, timepieces, perfumes, cosmetics and skincare products. The group had revenue of 53.7 billion euros in 2018.

The great rival of LVMH is the luxury group Kering, founded in 1963 by François Pinault, and now run by his son, François-Henri Pinault. It controls many well-known brands, including Saint-Laurent, Gucci, Brioni, Boucheron, Balenciaga, Bottega Veneta, and had revenues in 2020 of 13.1 billion euros. Kering has its headquarters at 40 rue de Sèvres in the 7th arrondissement of Paris, in the former Hôpital Laennec.

L'Oreal is the world's largest cosmetics company, and ranked 395 in the Fortune Global 500. Founded in 1909, its headquarters is located in Clichy, in the Hauts-de-Seine Department.

=== Internet and telecommunications ===
The largest telecom company and internet provider in France is Orange S.A., known until 2000 as France Télécom. It is the 15th largest telecom company in the world, and number 43 in the Fortune Global 500. It had revenue of 39.445 billion Euros in 2014, and has 230 million customers worldwide. It was founded in 1994, and acquired by France Telecom in 2000. The headquarters of Orange is at 78 rue Olivier des Serres in the 15th arrondissement.

The second giant telecom in Paris is Numericable-SFR, with 22.39 million subscribers, and revenue of 12.63 billion dollars in 2014. The SFR stands for Societé française du radiotéléphone, or French radio-telephone company, founded in 1987 before the Internet age. It is currently owned by a Luxembourg-based conglomerate, the Altice group. The company's registered headquarters is on 1 square Bela Bartok in the 15th arrondissement, while its new administrative headquarters is in the suburb of Saint-Denis, just north of Paris.

Other major telecom companies in the Paris Region include Bouygues Telecom. The company, part of the Bouygues Group, primarily a construction company, had revenue of 4.32 billion Euros in 2014 and 13.549 million subscribers. The main office of Bouygues Telcom is at 37-39 rue Boissiére in the 16th arrondissement. Free Mobile is the newest and 4th largest internet provider in France, founded in 2007, with 11 million subscribers and revenue of 1.6 billion Euros in 2014. It is part of the Iliad SA group, founded by Xavier Niel in 1990. The headquarters of Free Mobile is the Free Center, 8 rue de la Ville-Évéque in the 8th arrondissement.

=== Media and entertainment ===
The major digital media company located in Paris is Vivendi, which is the leading film and audiovisual production company in the EU. It owns the TV channel and movie producer Canal+, as well as the Universal Music group in the United States, and the video-sharing website Dailymotion. It had revenue in 2013 of 22.135 billion euros. Its headquarters is located on Avenue de Friedland in the 8th arrondissement. Canal Plus has its headquarters in the business district of Issy-les-Moulineaux, where several TV channels and major media companies have their offices, including France 24, Eurosport, Technicolor SA, and Microsoft France.

The major French film studios are also located in the Paris Region. Gaumont was the first motion picture company in the world, founded in 1896. Along with its television production company, Gaumont International Television, it earned revenue of 169 million euros in 2013. It is located in Neuilly-sur-Seine, just west of Paris. In 2008, Disneynature, a subsidiary of the United States-based The Walt Disney Company, was established to produce independent nature documentary films.

Pathé was the second film studio established in the world, after Gaumont. Together with Pathé, it owns a chain of multiplex movie theaters in France and throughout Europe.

Disneyland Paris is an amusement park and resort complex located in Marne-la-Vallée, twenty miles east of Paris, which opened in 1992. It attracted 15 million visitors in 2014, making it one of the most visited tourist sites in the Paris Region. It earned revenue of 1.309 billion dollars, but lost 27.5 million euro, due to the weak European economy.

=== Transportation ===
The SNCF (Société nationale des chemins de fer français, or "French National Railway Company") is France's national railway company which manages the rail traffic in France and the Principality of Monaco. It operates about 14,000 trains daily. It operates all of France's rail services, including the TGV, France's high-speed rail network. It owns 70 percent of the Thalys high-speed train to Belgium and the Netherlands, and 55 percent of the Eurostar from Paris to London.

The SNCF is owned by the France state. In 2014 it had revenues of 36.138 million dollars, but this represented a drop of 15 percent from 2013. The SNCF has fallen from 214 in the Global 500 in 2010 to 253 in 2013, then down to 322 in 2014.

The headquarters of the SNCF was formerly in the 14th arrondissement of Paris, but in July 2013 it was moved to the suburb of Saint-Denis.

Air France is the national airline of France. In 2014 it had revenues of 33.12 billion dollars, representing a loss of 262 million dollars, due to high costs and stiff competition from low-cost airlines and the new airlines from the Persian Gulf. Air France dropped in rank in the Fortune Global 500 from 351 in 2013 to 365 in 2014.

The headquarters of Air France is located at Charles DeGaulle Airport, in the Commune of Roissy-en-France;

A company called Airports of Paris manages all of the civilian airports in the Paris Region, including Charles de Gaulle Airport, Le Bourget Airport and Orly Airport. It also manages a number of overseas airports, particularly in the Middle East, including the airports of Tripoli, Zagreb, Amman, Algiers and Islamabad. The company has 9,500 employees in the Paris Region. Its headquarters is located at 291 boulevard Raspail, in the 14th arrondissement.

== Economic history ==
=== Lutece ===
The location of Lutece, the Gallo-Roman town that became Paris, made it prosperous; It was on the main river trade route, via the Seine and Rhône rivers, between Britain and to the Roman colony of Provence and the Mediterranean Sea; and it was also the easiest place to cross the Seine; the residents collected fees for crossing the bridge. The people of Lutece minted their own gold coins which were used for trade across Europe. Coins from the towns along the Rhine and Danube and even from Cádiz in Spain were found in the excavations of the ancient city. They also were known throughout Gaul for the quality of their jewelry and other ornaments made by the town's craftsmen.

=== Medieval Paris ===
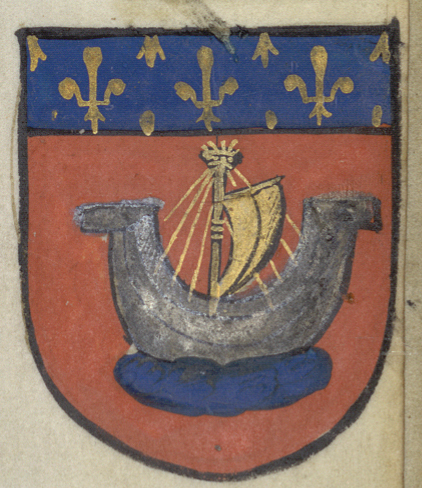
The Coat of Arms of the league of Paris river merchants in the Middle Ages became the emblem of the city of Paris.

Commerce was also a major source of the wealth and influence of Paris in the Middle Ages. In 1121, during the reign of Louis VI, the King accorded to the league of boatmen of Paris a fee of sixty centimes for each boatload of wine which arrived in the city during the harvest. In 1170, Louis VII extended the privileges of the river merchants even further; only the boatmen of Paris were allowed to conduct commerce on the river between the bridge of Mantes and the two bridges of Paris.

The large monasteries also played an important role in the growth of commerce in the Middle Ages by holding large fairs, which attracted merchants from as far away as Saxony and Italy. The Abbey of Saint Denis had been holding a large annual fair since the seventh century; the fair of Saint-Mathias dated to the 8th century; the Lenit Fair appeared in the 10th century, and the Fair of the Abbey of Saint-Germain-des-Pres began in the 12th century.

By the 15th century separate ports were established along the river for the delivery of wine, grain, plaster, paving stones, hay, fish, and charcoal. Wood for cooking fires and heating was unloaded at one port, while wood for construction arrived at another. The merchants engaged in each kind of commerce gathered around that port; in 1421, of the twenty-one wine merchants registered in Paris, eleven were located between the Pont Notre-Dame and the hotel Saint-Paul, the neighborhood where their port was located.

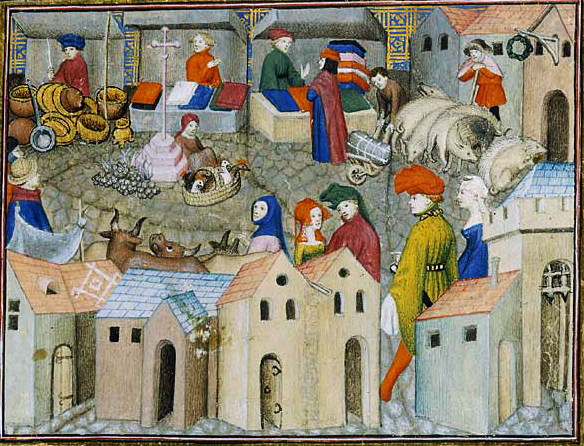
A Paris market, from Le Chevalier Errant by Thomas de Saluces (about 1403)

In the early Middle Ages, the principal market of Paris was located on the parvis, or square in front of the Cathedral of Notre-Dame. Other markets took place in the vicinity of the two bridges, the Grand Pont and the Petit Pont, while a smaller market called Palu or Palud, took place in the eastern neighborhood of the city. The most important market appeared in 1137 when Louis VI purchased a piece of land called Les Champeaux not far from the Place de Grève to create a grain market; over the course of the Middle Ages halls for meat, fish, fruits and vegetables and other food products were built around the grain market, and it became the main food market, and was known as Les Halles. It continued to be the main produce market until the late 20th century, when it was transferred to Rungis in the Paris suburbs.

After the merchants, the second important business community in Paris were the artisans and craftsmen, who produced and sold goods of all kinds. They were organized into guilds, or corporations, which had strict rules and regulations to protect their members against competition and unemployment. The oldest four corporations were the drapiers, who made cloth; the merciers, who made and sold clothing, the epiciers, who sold food and spices, and the pelletiers, who made fur garments. But there were many more specialized professions, ranging from shoemakers and jewelers to those who made armor and swords. The guilds strictly limited the number of apprentices in each trade, and the number of years of apprenticeship. Certain guilds tended to gather on the same streets, though this was not a strict rule. The drapers had their shops on the rue de la Vielle-Draperie on the Ile de la Cité, while the Pelletiers were just north of them; the armorers north of the Châtelet fortress and east of rue saint-Denis.

Money-changers were active in Paris since at least 1141; they knew the exact values of all the different silver and gold coins in circulation in Europe. They had their establishments primarily on the Grand Pont, which became known as the pont aux Changeurs and then simply the Post au Change. Tax Records show that in 1423 the money-changers were among the wealthiest persons in the city; of the twenty persons with the highest incomes, ten were money-changers, Between 1412 and 1450, four Changers occupied the position of Provost of the Merchants. But by the end of the 15th century, the system of wealth had changed; the wealthiest Parisians were those who had bought land or positions in the royal administration and were close to the King. Some money-changers branched into a new trade, that of lending money for interest. Since this was officially forbidden by the Catholic Church, most in the profession were either Jews or Lombards from Italy. The Lombards, connected to a well-organizer banking system in Italy, specialized in loans to the wealthy and the nobility, Their activities were recorded in Paris archives from 1292 onwards; they made important loans to King Philip IV and Philip VI.

=== 17th and 18th centuries ===
At the beginning of the 17th century, the most important industry of the city was textiles; weaving and dyeing cloth, and making bonnets, belts, ribbons, and an assortment of other items of clothing. The dyeing industry was located in the Faubourg Saint-Marcel, along the River Bievre, which was quickly polluted by the workshops and dye vats along its banks. The largest workshops there, which made the fortunes of the families Gobelin, Canaye and Le Peultre, were dyeing six hundred thousand pieces of cloth a year in the mid-16th century, but, because of growing foreign competition, their output dropped to one hundred thousand pieces at the start of the 17th century, and the whole textile industry was struggling. Henry IV and Louis XIII observed that wealthy Parisians were spending huge sums to import silks, tapestries, glassware leather goods and carpets from Flanders, Spain, Italy and Turkey. They encouraged French businessmen to make the same luxury products in Paris.

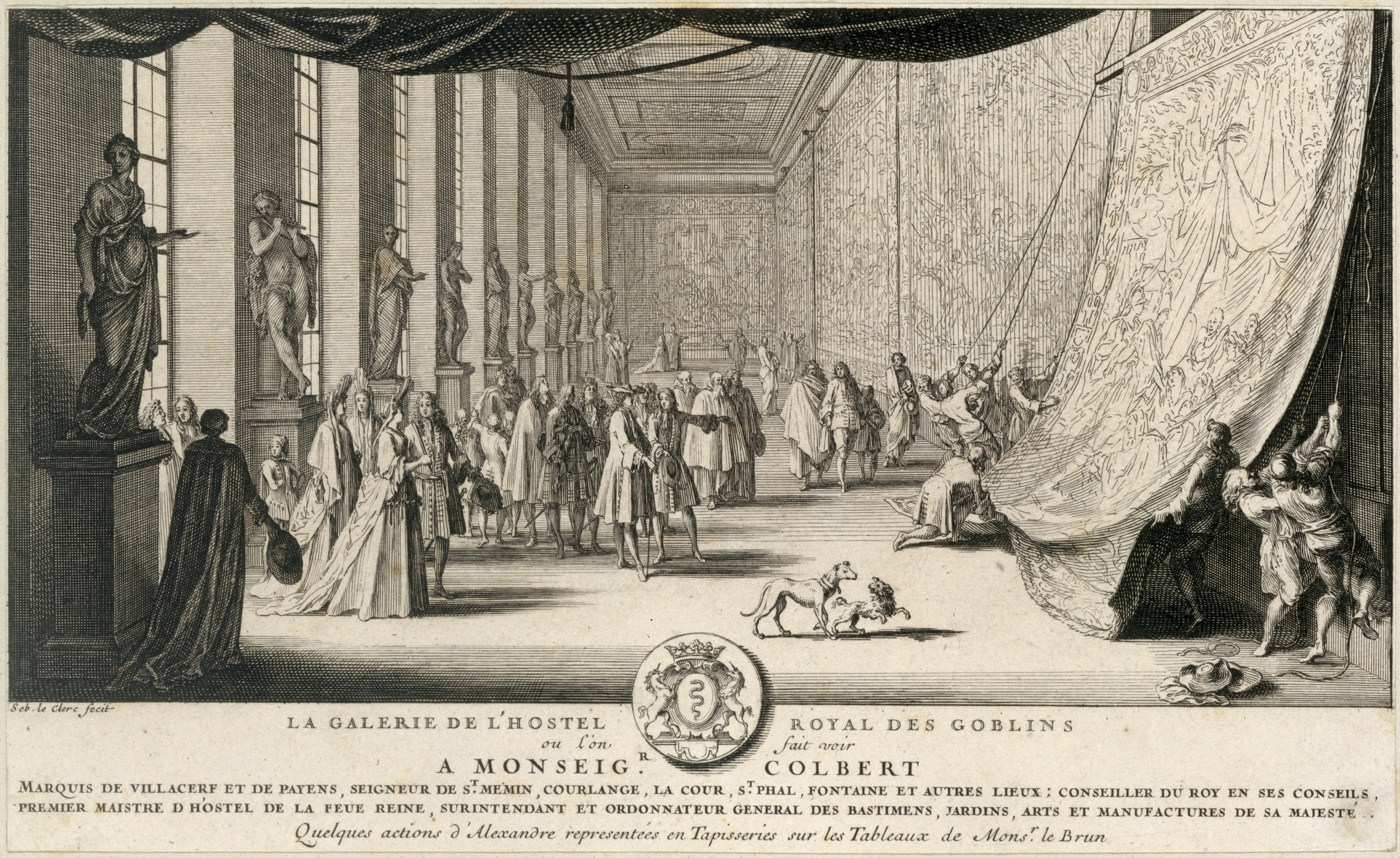
Colbert visits the Gobelins tapestry workshop (1665)

With this royal encouragement, the financier Moisset launched an enterprise to make cloth woven with threads of gold, silver and silk. It failed, but was replaced by other successful ventures. The first tapestry workshop was opened, with royal assistance, in the Louvre, then at the Savonnerie and at Chaillot. The Gobelins enterprise of dyers brought in two Flemish tapestry makers in 1601 and began to make its own tapestries in the Flemish style. Master craftsmen from Spain and Italy opened small enterprises to make high-quality leather goods. Workshops making fine furniture were opened by German craftsmen in the faubourg Saint-Antoine. A royal glass factory was opened 1601 in Saint-Germain-des-Prés to compete with Venetian glassmakers. A large factory was opened at Reuilly to produce and polish mirrors made by Saint-Gobain.

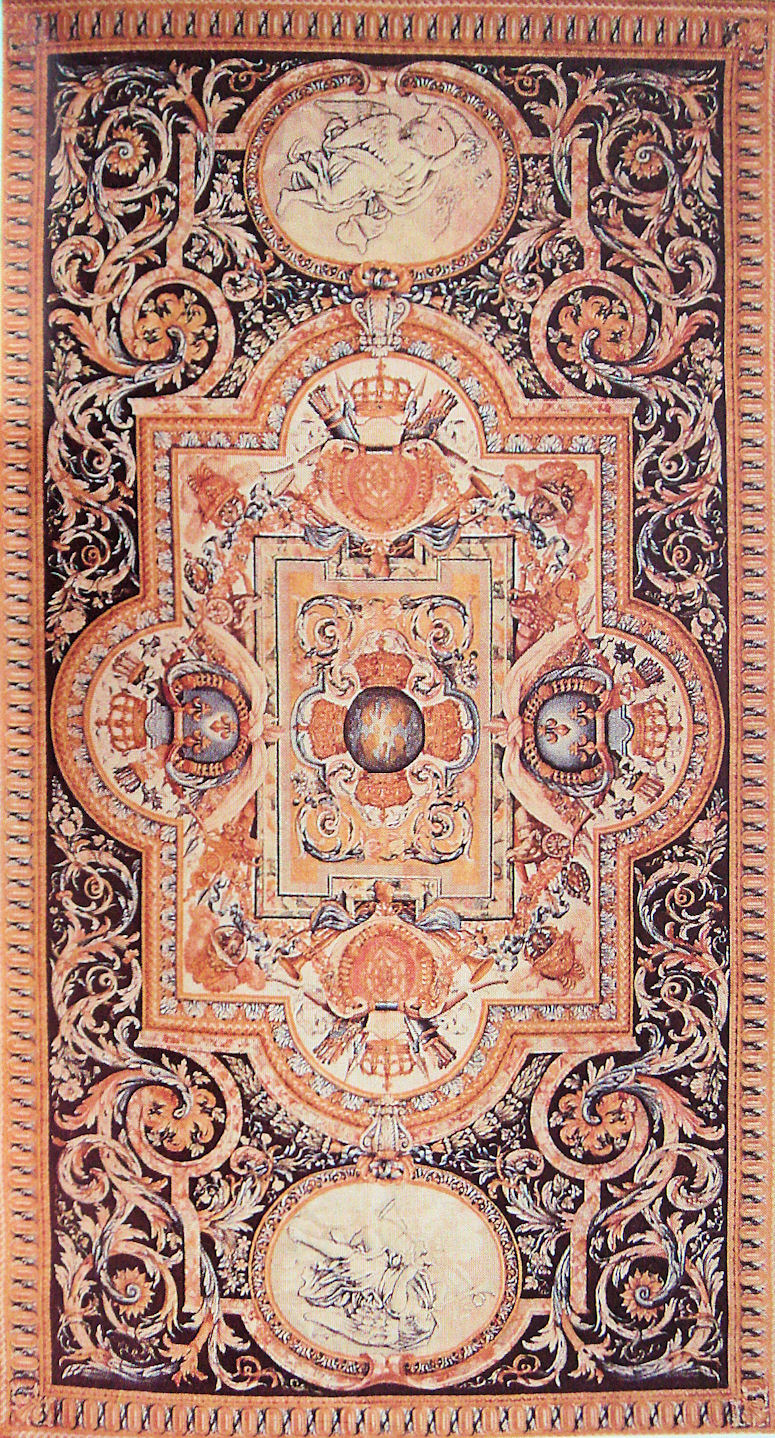
A carpet made by the royal Savonnerie workshop for the Louvre

Under Louis XIV and his minister of finance, Jean-Baptiste Colbert, the royal manufacturies were expanded. The most skilled artisans in Europe were recruited and brought to Paris. In 1665 the enterprise of Hindret, located in the old château de Madrid in the Bois de Boulogne, produced the first French silk stockings. The Gobelins workshops began to produce furniture for the royal residences as well as tapestries, while the Savonnerie Manufactory produced magnificent carpets for the royal palaces. The quality of the carpets, tapestries, furniture, glass and other products was unmatched; the problem was that it was nearly all destined for a single client, the King, and his new residence at Versailles. The royal manufacturies were kept going by enormous subsidies from the royal treasury.

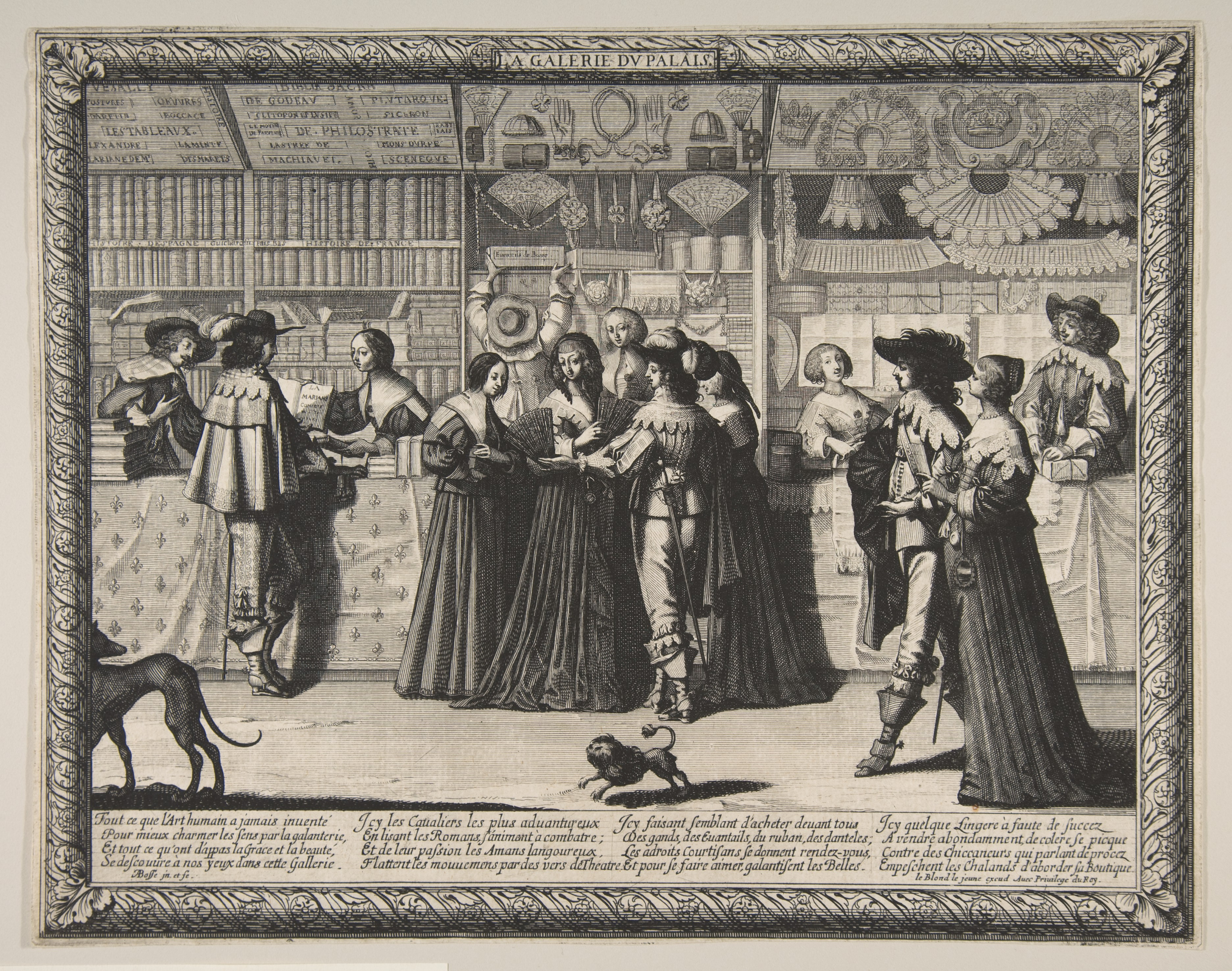
Gallery of shops in the Palais de Paris, by Abraham Bosse (1638)

The most important market for luxury goods was located on the Île-de-la-Cité, in the spacious gallery of the old royal palace, where it had been since at least the fourteenth century. The palace was no longer occupied by the King, and had become the administrative headquarters of the Kingdom, occupied by the courts, the treasury, and other government offices. The small shops in the gallery sold a wide variety of expensive gowns, cloaks, perfumes, hats, bonnets, children's wear, gloves, and other items of clothing. Books were another luxury items sold there; they were hand-printed, expensively bound, and rare.

Clocks and watches were another important luxury good made in Paris shops. Access to the profession was strictly controlled; at the beginning of the 17th century, the guild of horlogers had twenty-five members. Each horloger was allowed to have no more than one apprentice, and apprenticeship lasted six years. Nearly all the clock and watchmakers were Protestants; when Louis XIV revoked the Edict of Nantes in 1685, most of the horlogers refused to renounce their faith and emigrated to Geneva, England and Holland, and France no longer dominated the industry.

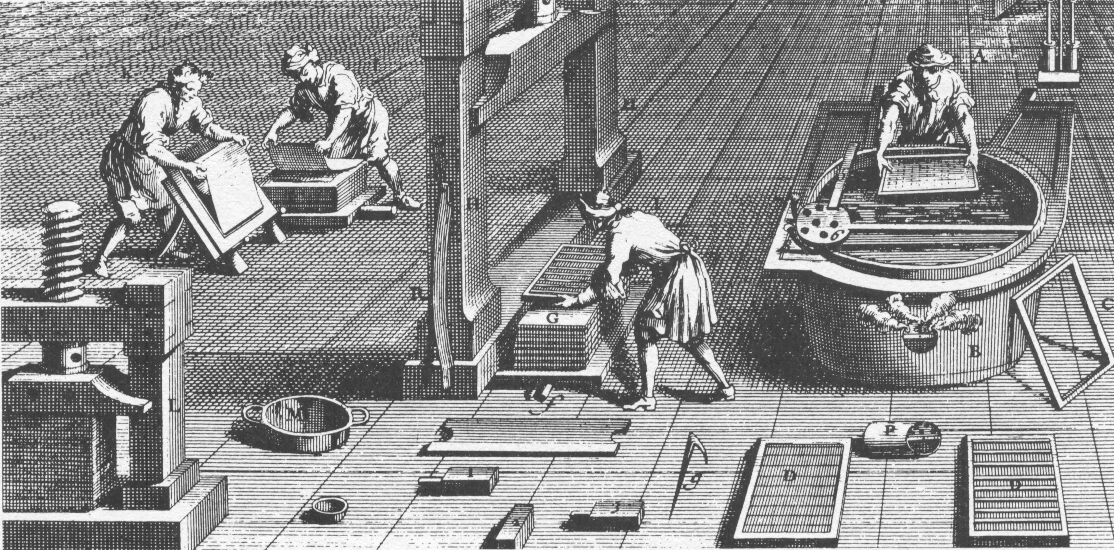
Illustration of paper manufacturing, from Diderot's Encyclopédie

During most of the 18th century, the Parisian economy was based on thousands of small workshops, where skilled artisans produced products. The workshops were clustered in particular neighborhoods; furniture makers in the faubourg Saint-Antoine; cutlery and small metal-work in neighborhood called the Quinze Vingts near the Bastille. There were a few large enterprises, including the dye factory of Gobelins, next to the Bièvre river, which made scarlet dye for the Gobelin royal tapestry workshop, the oldest factory in the city, founded at the end of the 17th century; the royal manufactory of Sèvres, making porcelain; the royal mirror factory in the faubourg Saint-Antoine, which employed a thousand workers; and the factory of Réveillon on rue de Montreuil, which made painted wallpaper.

In the second half of the 18th century, new scientific discoveries and new technologies changed the scale of Paris industry. Between 1778 and 1782, large steam engines were installed at Chaillot and Gros-Caillou to pump drinking water from the Seine. Major changes took place between 1770 and 1790 in chemical manufacturing, due to the pioneering work of French chemists. The first chemical factories were built between 1770 and 1779, based on the work of Lavoisier, an innovative chemist who was head of the laboratory of the Paris Arsenal and was also the head of the royal administration for making gunpowder. He modernized the production of saltpeter, the main ingredient of black powder, in large factories around Paris. The French chemist Berthollet discovered chlorine in 1785, creating a new industry for the manufacture of potassium chloride.

New discoveries about acids, used extensively in fabric dyeing and metallurgy, led to the creation of new industries in Paris; the first French plant to manufacture sulfuric acid was opened in 1779. It was owned by the brother of King Louis XVI, the Count of Artois; the King himself promoted it, eager that France complete successfully with England in industrial manufacturing. The chemical factory at Javel branched out to make other chemical products, including chlorine and hydrogen gas; the hydrogen made possible the first manned balloon flights by the Montgolfier Brothers shortly before the Revolution.

In the domain of finance and banking, Paris was far behind other European capitals, and even other French cities. The first venture of Paris into modern finance was launched by the Scottish economist John Law, who, encouraged by the Regent, in 1716 started a private bank and issued paper money. Law invested heavily in the Mississippi Company, causing wild speculation, with shares rising to sixty times their original value. The bubble burst in 1720, and Law closed the bank and fled the country, ruining many Parisian investors. Thereafter, Parisians were suspicious of banks and bankers. The Bourse, or Paris stock market, did not open until 24 September 1724 on rue Vivienne, in the former hôtel de Nevers, long after stock markets had existed in Lyon, Marseille, Bordeaux, Toulouse and other cities. The Banque de France was not founded until 1800, long after the Bank of Amsterdam (1609), and the Bank of England (1694).

Fashion and haute couture was a flourishing business in the mid and late 18th century, as the aristocrats copied the styles of clothing worn by the Queen and her court, and the wives of Paris bankers and wealthy merchants copied the styles worn by the aristocrats. The fashion industry was formally born in 1776, when the guild of fashion merchants (marchands de mode), along with plume merchants and florists, was officially separated from the mercers, those who sold ordinary clothing. By 1779 two hundred different models of hat were being sold in Paris, at prices ranging from ten to one hundred pounds, along with every other possible fashion item.

The Paris perfume industry also emerged in its modern form in the second part the 18th century, after the guild of perfumers separated from the guild of glove-makers. The perfumes were usually made in Grasse, in Provence, but the shops that sold them were opened in Paris. In 1798 the perfumer of the Queen, Pierre-François Lubin, opened a perfume shop at 53 rue Helvétius (now rue Sainte-Anne), with the name au Bouquet de Roses. Other perfumers opened similar shops catering to wealthy Parisians and visitors.

=== 19th century ===
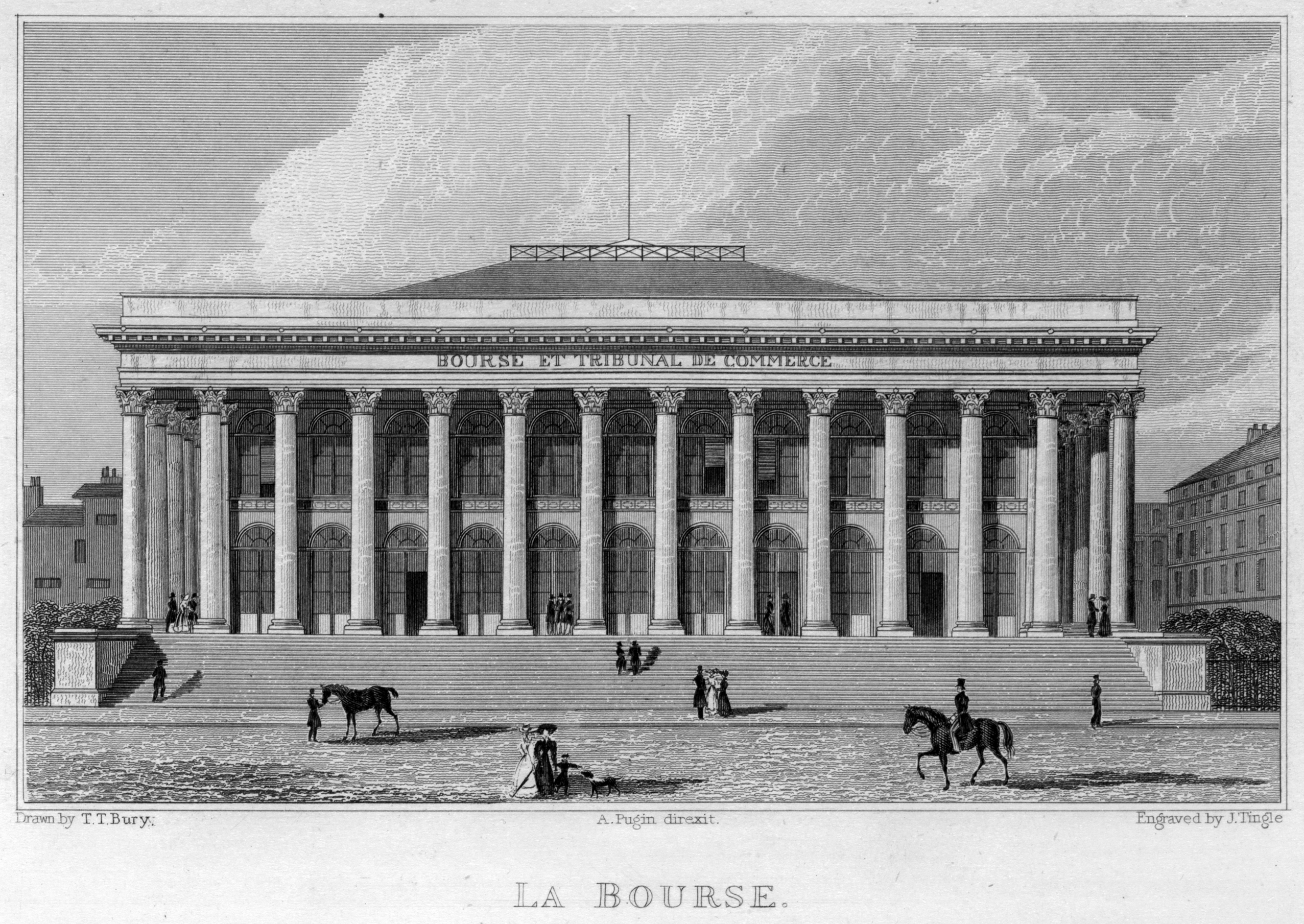
Paris stock exchange, La Bourse (1831)

The metric system was introduced in 1803, as was the franc, worth one hundred centimes, and the sou, worth five centimes. The gold Napoleon coin was worth either 20 or 40 francs, and the government also issued silver coins worth five, two and one franc. The government did not have the resources to collect and remake all the coins of the former regimes, so the gold Louis, with an image of the King, worth 24 pounds, and the écu, a silver count worth three of six pounds, were also legal currency. The coins of all the states within the Empire were also in circulation, including those of the German states, northern and central Italy, the Netherlands, and the Austrian Netherlands (now Belgium).

During the Restoration, Paris became the cradle of the Industrial Revolution in France. The textile industry had already been installed in the faubourg Saint-Antoine by the firm of Richard and Lenoir, and by Albert in the Faubourg Saint-Denis. In 1812, Benjamin Delessert had built the first refinery of sugar beets at Passy, which became one of the largest industrial enterprises in the Paris Region. In 1818, he joined forces with Baron Jean-Conrad Hottinguer to create the Caisse d'Epargne et de Prévoyance de Paris, France's first savings bank. French scientists made important advances in new technologies, including the manufacture of rubber, aluminum, and gilded products, which were turned into industries. Even before the Revolution, in 1779 the Count of Artois, the brother of the King, had built the first chemical plant on the plain of Javel, next to the Seine, making sulfuric acid, potash, and chlorine, called "Eau de Javel." The plant also made hydrogen gas, used in the first manned balloon flights, and varnish, used to seal the fabric of balloons. During the Restoration, inspired by the work of the chemist Jean-Antoine Chaptal and other scientists, new factories were built along the left bank of the Seine, making a wide variety of new chemical products, but also heavily polluting the river.

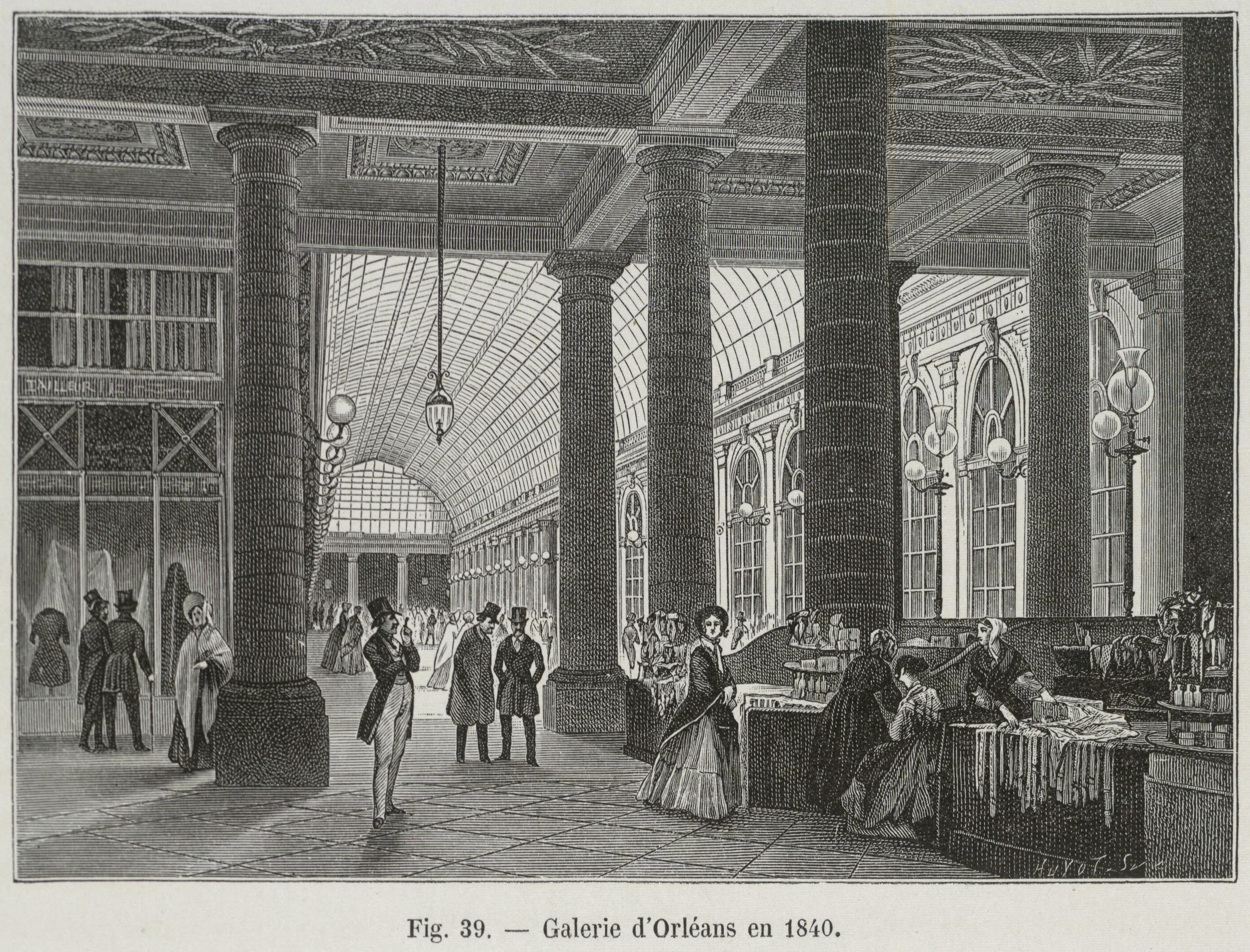
Galerie d'Orléans of the Palais-Royal in 1840

The commerce in luxury goods had suffered greatly during the Revolution, as the chief buyers, the aristocracy, had been driven into exile. Their return during the Restoration and especially the rapid growth of the number of wealthy Parisians revived the business in jewelry, furniture, fine clothing, watches and other luxury products. The finest shops of Paris were lined up along the Rue Saint-Honoré.

The Industrial Revolution steadily changed the economy and the appearance of Paris, as new factories were built along the Seine and in the outer neighborhoods of the city. The textile industry was in decline, but the chemical industry was expanding around the edges of the city, at Javel, Grenelle, Passy, Clichy, Belleville and Pantin. It was joined by mills and factories making steel, machines and tools, especially for the new railroad industry. Paris ranked third in France in metallurgy, after Saint-Étienne and the Nord department. Between 1830 and 1847, twenty percent of all the steam engines produced in France were made in Paris. Many of these were produced at the locomotive factory built by Jean-François Cail in 1844, first at Chaillot, then at Grenelle, which became one of the largest enterprises in Paris.

One example of the new factories in Paris was the cigarette and cigar factory of Philippon, between rue de l'Université and the quai d'Orsay. Napoleon's soldiers had brought the habit of smoking from Spain, and it had spread among all classes of Parisians. The government had a monopoly on the manufacture of tobacco products, and the government-owned factory opened in 1812. It employed 1,200 workers, a large number of them women, and also included a school and laboratory, run by the École Polytechnique, to develop new methods of tobacco production.

Despite the surge of industrialization, most Parisian workers were employed in small workshops and enterprises. In 1847, there were 350,000 workers in Paris employed in 65,000 businesses. Only seven thousand businesses employed more than ten workers. For example, in 1848 there were 377 small workshops in Paris making and selling umbrellas, employing a total of 1,442 workers.

With the surge of industrialization, the importance of banking and finance in the Paris economy also grew. As Stendhal wrote at the time, the bankers were the new aristocracy of Paris. In 1837, Jacques Laffitte founded the first business bank in Paris, the Caisse générale du commerce et de l'industrie. In 1842, Hippolyte Ganneron founded a rival commercial bank, the Comptoir général du commerce. The banks provided the funding for the most important economic event of the July Monarchy, the arrival of the railroads. The brothers Émile and Issac Péreire, the grandchildren of an immigrant from Portugal, founded the first railway line to Paris. James Mayer de Rothschild, the chief rival of the Péreire brothers, was the most famous banker of the July Monarchy. He gave loans to the government of Louis-Philippe and played a key role in the construction of the French mining industry and railroad network.

The reign of Louis-Philippe became known as "the reign of the boutique". During the July Monarchy, Paris continued to be the marketplace of luxury goods for wealthiest of Europe, and the leader in fashion. The perfumer Pierre-François-Pascal Guerlain had opened his first shop on the rue de Rivoli in 1828. In 1840, he opened a larger shop at 145 rue de la Paix, which was also the first street in Paris to be lit with gaslight. The porcelain factory at Sèvres, which had long made table settings for the royal courts of Europe, began to make them for the bankers and industrialists of Paris.

The Passage des Panoramas and other covered shopping galleries were ancestors of the modern shopping center. Another new kind of store was the Magasin de Nouveautés, or novelty store. The Grand Colbert in the Galerie Colbert on rue Vivienne was decorated and organized like an oriental bazaar; it had large plate glass windows and window displays, fixed prices and price tags, and sold a wide variety of products for women, from cashmere and lace to hosiery and hats. It was an ancestor to the modern department store, which first opened in Paris in the 1850s. Other novel marketing techniques were introduced in Paris at this time: the illuminated sign, and advertising goods in newspapers. The arrival of the railroad made it possible for people from the provinces to come to Paris simply to shop.

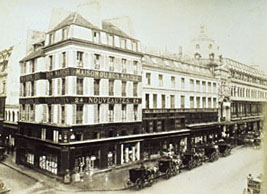
Bon Marché, the first modern department store, in 1867

The Second Empire saw a revolution in retail commerce, as the Paris middle class and consumer demand grew rapidly. The revolution was fuelled in large part by Paris fashions, especially the crinoline, which demanded enormous quantities of silk, satin, velour, cashmere, percale, mohair, ribbons, lace and other fabrics and decorations. Prior to the Second Empire, clothing and luxury shops were small and catered to a very small clientele; their windows were covered with shutters or curtains. Any who entered had to explain his presence to the clerks, and prices were never posted; customers had to ask.

Under Napoleon III, The new Haussmann boulevards created space for new stores, and it was easier for customers to cross the city to shop. In a short time, the commerce in novelties, fabrics and clothing began to be concentrated in a few very large department stores. Bon Marché, was opened in 1852 by Aristide Boucicaut, the former chief of the Petit Thomas variety store, in a modest building, and expanded rapidly, its income going from 450,000 francs a year to 20 million. Boucicaut commissioned a new building with a glass and iron framework designed in part by Gustave Eiffel, which opened in 1869, and became the model for the modern department store. The Grand Magasin du Louvre opened in 1855, inside the vast luxury hotel built by the Pereire Brothers next to the Louvre and the Place Royale. It was the first department store that concentrated on luxury goods, and tried to both provide bargains and be snobbish. Other department stores quickly appeared: Printemps in 1865, the Grand Bazaar de l'Hôtel de Ville (BHV) in 1869, and La Samaritaine in 1870. They were soon imitated around the world.

The new stores pioneered new methods of marketing, from holding annual sales to giving bouquets of violets to customers or boxes of chocolates to those who spent more than 25 francs. They offered a wide variety of products and prices; Bon Marché offered fifty-four kinds of crinolines, and thirty different kinds of silk. The Grand Magasin du Louvre sold shawls ranging in price from 30 francs to 600 francs.

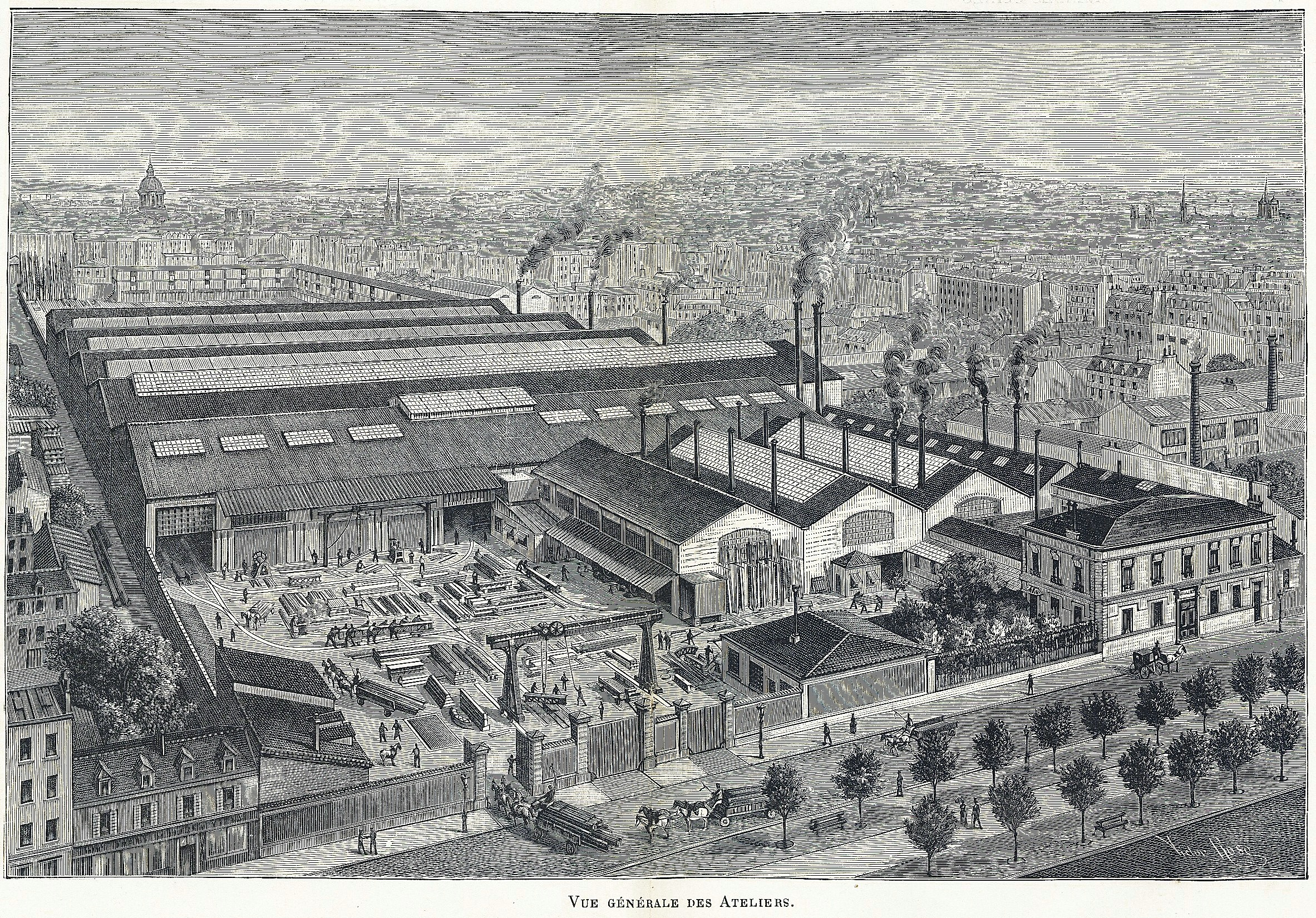
The Moisant workshop on Boulevard de Vaugirard (1889) made the metal structure of the Bon Marché department store.

The economy of Paris suffered an economic crisis in the early 1870s, followed by a long, slow recovery; then a period of rapid growth beginning in 1895 until the First World War. Between 1872 and 1895, in the capital, 139 large enterprises closed their doors, particularly textile and furniture factories, those in the metallurgy sector, and printing houses, four industries which for sixty years had been the major employers in the city. Most of these enterprises had employed, each, between 100 and 200 workers. Half of the large enterprises on the center of the city's right bank moved out, in part because of the high cost of real estate, and also to get better access to transportation on the river and railroads. Several moved to less-expensive areas at the edges of the city, around Monparnasse and La Salpêtriére, while others went to the 18th arrondissement, La Villette and the Canal Saint-Denis, to be closer to the river ports and the new railroad freight yards, to Picpus and Charonne in the southeast, or near Grenelle and Javel in the southwest. The total number of enterprises in Paris dropped from 76,000 in 1872 to 60,000 in 1896, while in the suburbs their number grew from 11,000 to 13,000. In the heart of Paris, many workers were still employed in traditional industries such as textiles (18,000 workers), garment production (45,000 workers), and in the new industries which required highly skilled workers, such as mechanical and electrical engineering, and automobile manufacturing.

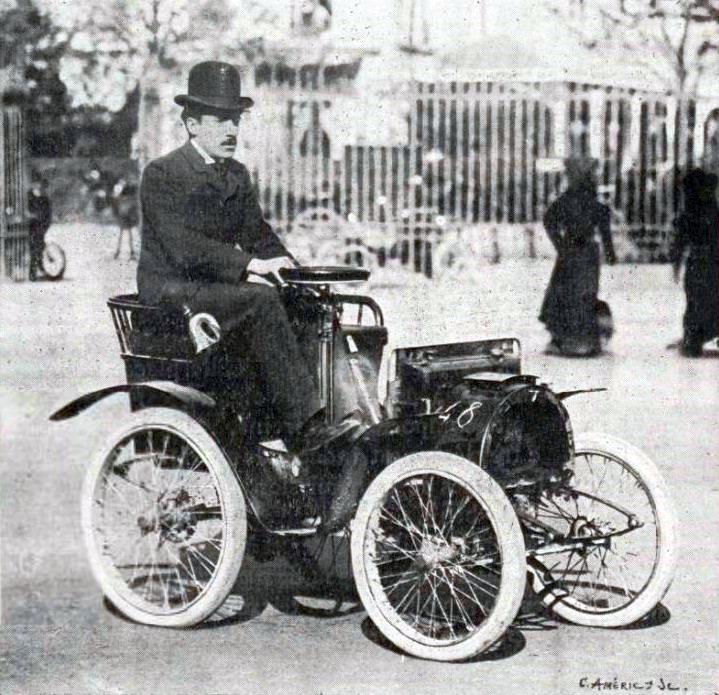
Louis Renault and his first car (1903)

Three major new French industries were born in and around Paris at almost the same time, taking advantage of the abundance of skilled engineers and technicians, and money from Paris banks. They produced the first French automobiles, aircraft, and motion pictures. In 1898, Louis Renault and his brother Marcel built their first automobile, and founded a new company to produce them. They established their first factory at Boulogne-Billancourt, just outside the city, and made the first French truck in 1906 in 1908, they built 3,595 cars, making them the largest car manufacturer in France. They received an important contract to make taxicabs for the largest Paris taxi company. When the first World War began in 1914, the Renault taxis of Paris were mobilized to carry French soldiers to the front at the First Battle of the Marne.

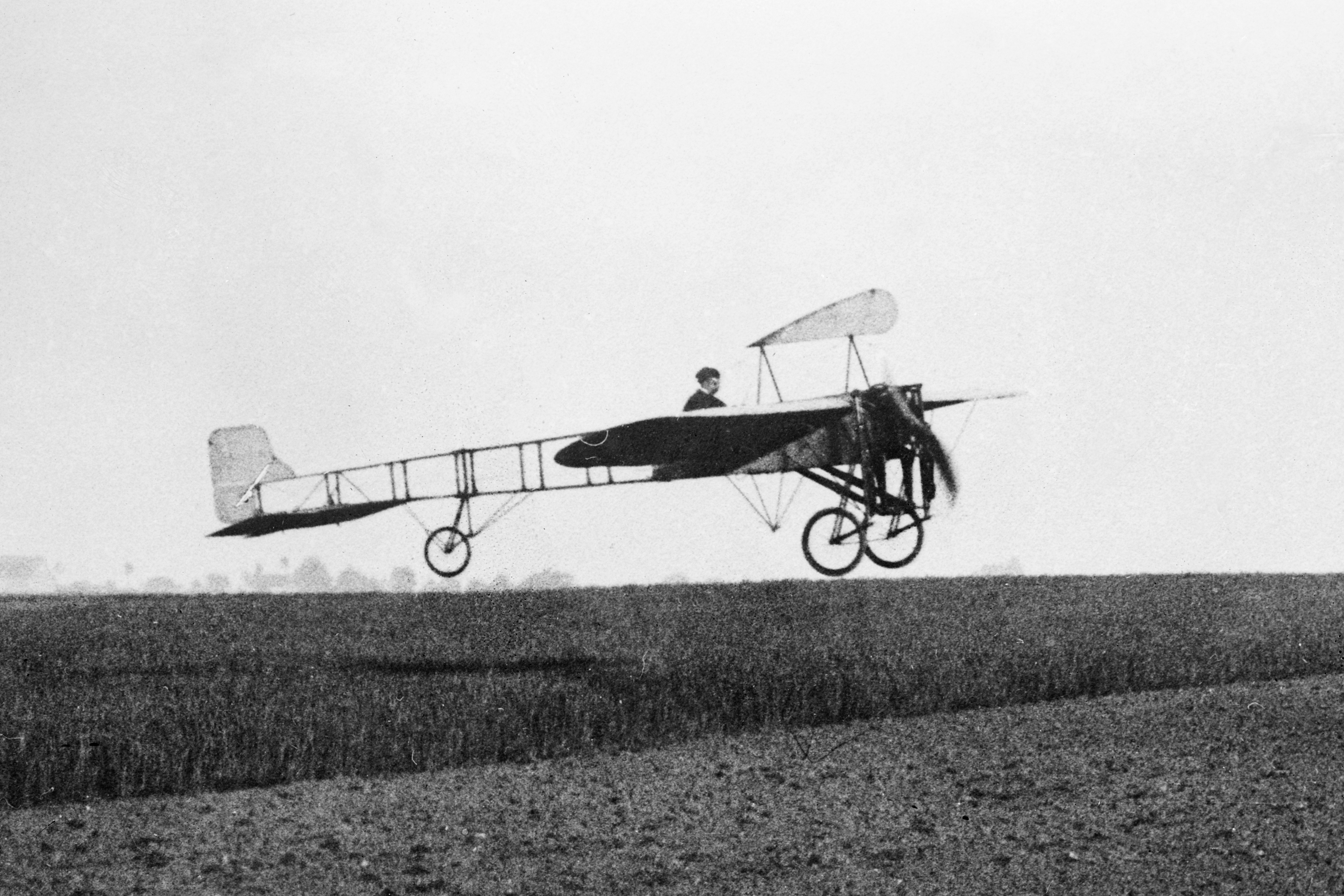
Louis Bleriot and his aircraft (1909)

The French aviation pioneer Louis Blériot also established a company, Blériot Aéronautique, on boulevard Victor-Hugo in Neuilly, where he manufactured the first French airplanes. On 25 July 1909, he became the first man to fly across the English Channel. Blériot moved his company to Buc, near Versailles, where he established a private airport and a flying school. In 1910, he built the Aérobus, one of the first passenger aircraft, which could carry seven persons, the most of any aircraft of the time.

The Lumière Brothers had given the first projected showing of a motion picture La Sortie de l'usine Lumière, at the Salon Indien du Grand Café of the Hôtel Scribe, boulevard des Capucines, on 28 December 1895. A young French entrepreneur, Georges Méliès, attended the first showing, and asked the Lumière brothers for a license to make films. The Lumière Brothers politely declined, telling him that the cinema was for scientific purposes, and had no commercial value. Méliès persisted, and established his own small studio in 1897 in Montreuil, just east of Paris. He became a producer, director, scenarist, set designer and actor, and made hundreds of short films, including the first science-fiction film, A Trip to the Moon (Le Voyage dans la Lune), in 1902. Another French cinema pioneer and producer Charles Pathé, also built a studio in Montreuil, then moved to rue des Vignerons in Vincennes, east of Paris. His chief rival in the early French film industry, Léon Gaumont, opened his first studio at about the same time at rue des Alouettes in the 19th arrondissement, near the Buttes-Chaumont.

=== 20th century ===
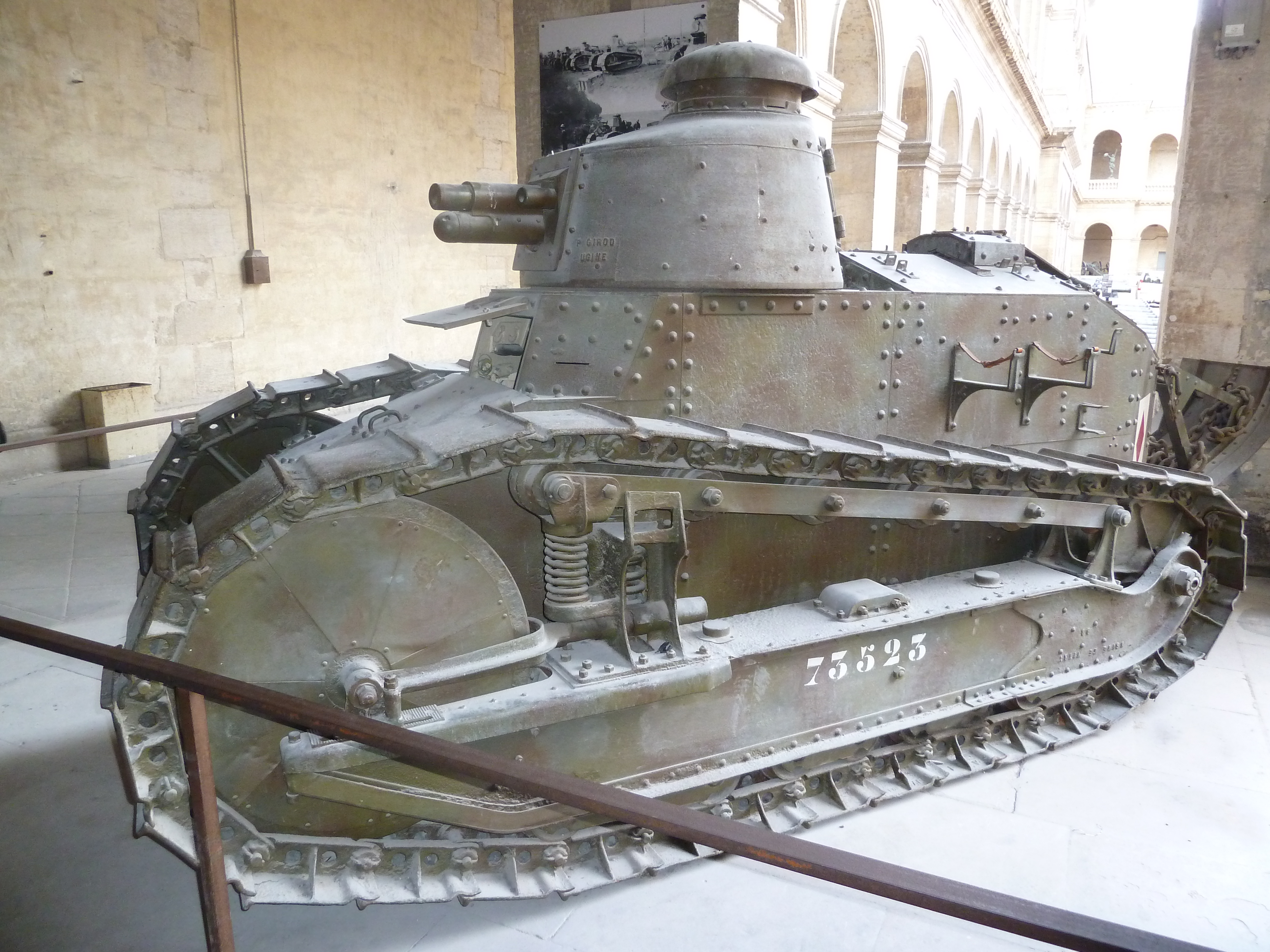
A Renault FT tank, made at Boulogne-Billancourt (1917), now in the Museum of the French Army

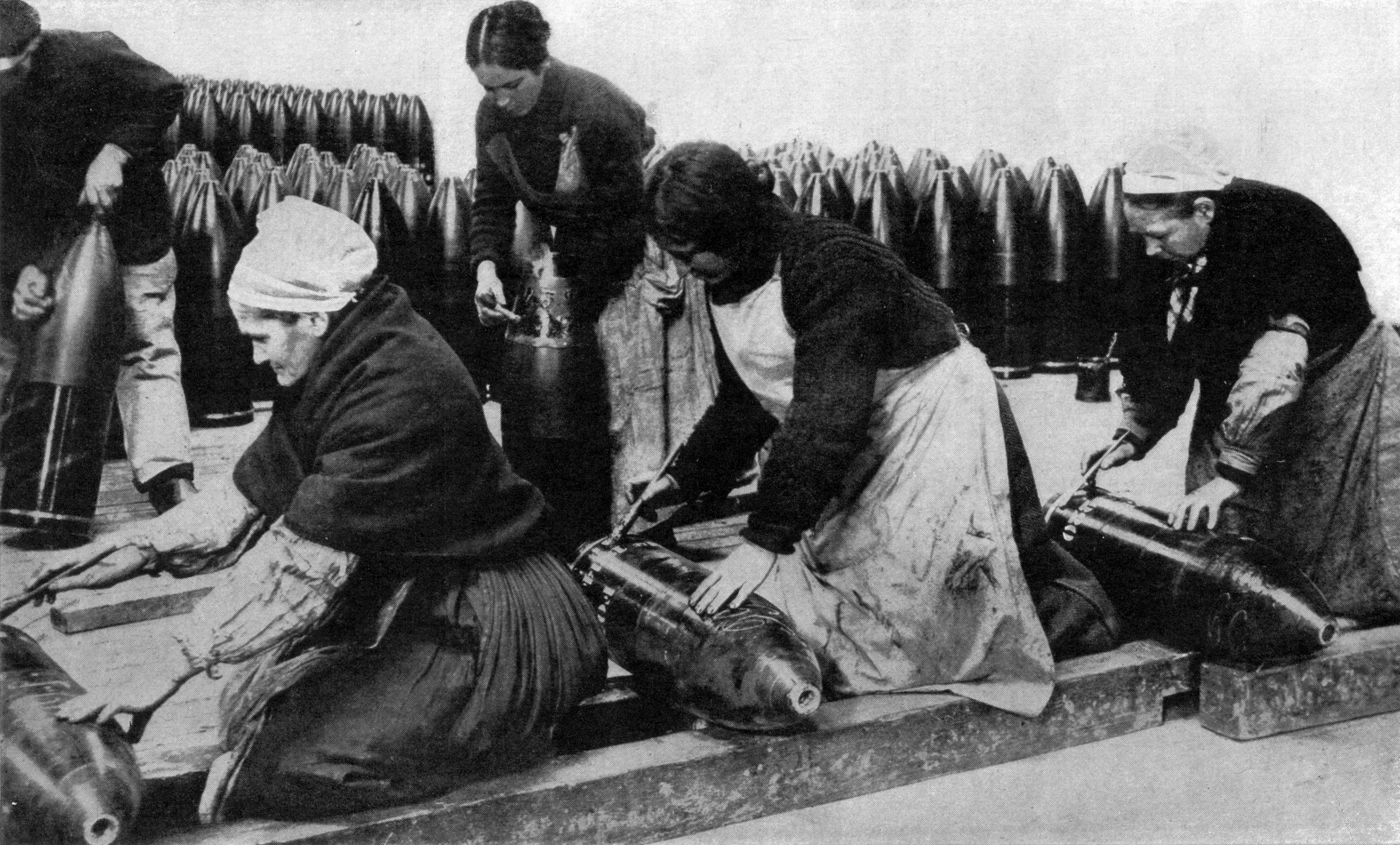
Munitionettes making artillery shells (1917)

The coal mines and major industrial cities of the north were behind German lines, forcing the government to reorganize the industry of Paris to provide the enormous quantities of weapons and ammunition that the army needed. The munitions factories of Paris had to produce one hundred thousand 75-millimeter artillery shells every day, in addition to other munitions, cannon, rifles, trucks, ambulances, and aircraft, as well as building the machine tools and factory equipment needed to expand production. The effort was led by Albert Thomas, a socialist politician who became the Secretary of State for Artillery. In 1915 more than a thousand Paris enterprises were working in the sector of National Defense. Most of the defense factories were located in the outer neighborhoods of the city, particularly the 13th, 14th, 15th and 18th arrondissements. A large Citroen factory was built at Javel, and the Renault factory at Boulogne-Billancourt was converted from making automobiles to making a revolutionary new weapon, the tank. The aviation firm Blériot Aéronautique built an enormous aircraft factory, covering 28,000 square meters, at Suresnes in 1917. The traditional small workshops of French industry were re-organized into huge assembly lines following the model of factory of Henry Ford in the United States and the productivity studies of Frederick Taylor on scientific management.

As factory workers were drafted and sent to the front, their places were taken by women as well as 183,000 colonials from Africa and Indo-China who were closely watched by the government. On 27 August 1915, 1,700 Chinese workers arrived at the Gare de Lyon to take positions in the Renault tank factory and other defense works.

The work in the defense factories was intense and dangerous, as inexperienced workers handled dangerous chemicals and high explosives. On 20 October 1915, a workshop making hand grenades at 173 rue de Tolbiac exploded, killing about fifty workers and injuring a hundred. In April 1918, a new factory in Vincennes making shells and mustard gas exploded, poisoning three hundred ten workers.

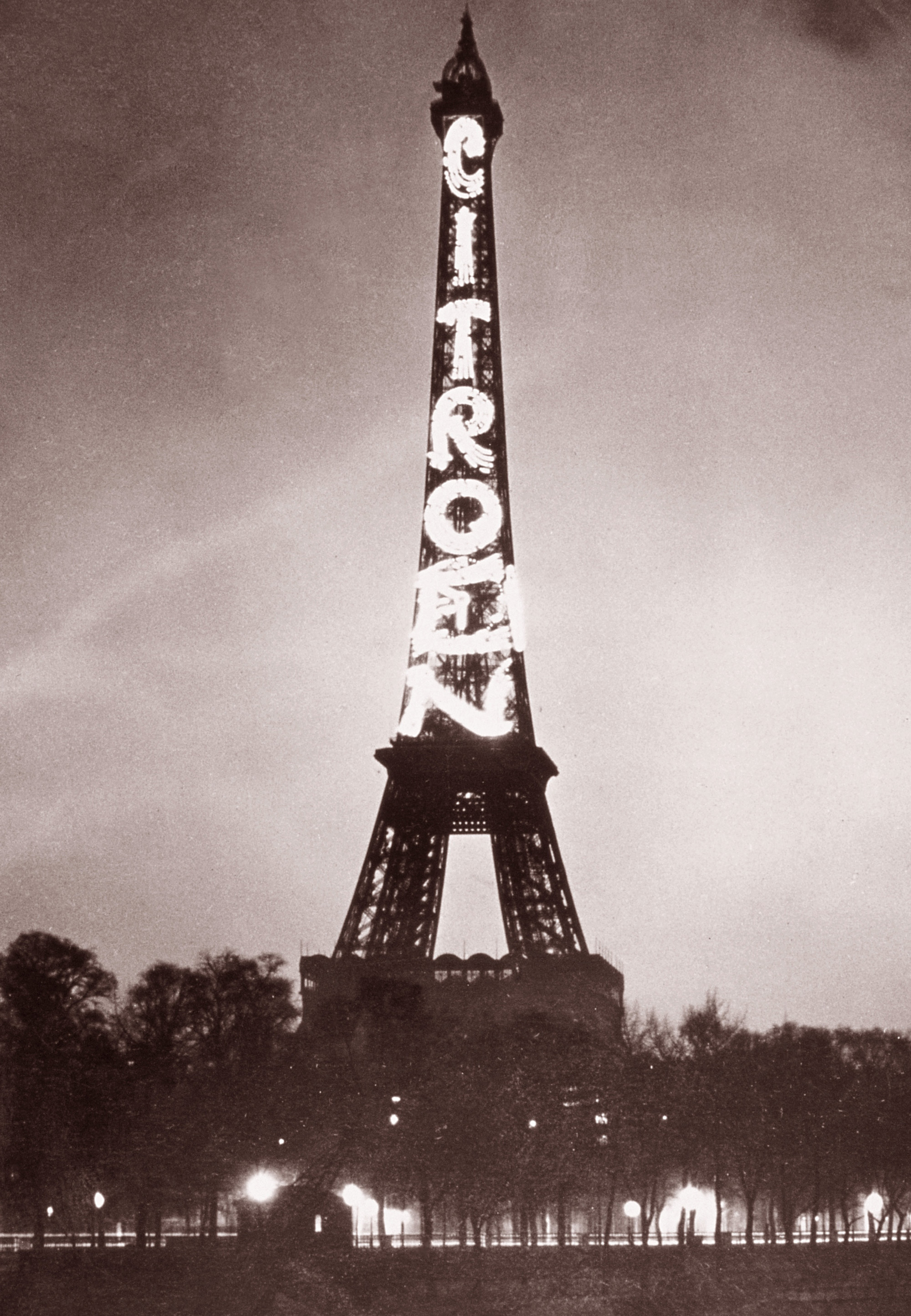
Advertising sign for Citroën cars on the Eiffel Tower (1925-1934)

As a result of the war, the French government was deeply in debt; the debt had multiplied six times from what it was before the War. Inflation was rampant; the amount of money in circulation had increased by five times during the War. The low value of the Franc against the dollar made the city attractive for foreign visitors such as Ernest Hemingway, who found prices for housing and food affordable, but it was difficult for the Parisians. Energy was in short supply; before leaving their front lines, the Germans had flooded the coal mines of northern France; coal production was not fully restored for five years. A large part of the government budget went to repaying the war debts, and another large part went to paying the pensions of widows, orphans, and wounded soldiers.

The weak franc was helpful for the major enterprises of Paris, which converted to making new products which had been developed during the war; automobiles, electric generators and motors, and chemical products. Due to low French costs, exports jumped by forty-two percent between 1923 and 1927.

A good example of a successful new Paris enterprise was the automobile company founded in 1919 by André Citroën (1878-1935). He was an industrial engineer who developed assembly lines to produce armaments during the First World War. In 1919 he put these technologies to work to mass-produce automobiles on a site next to Seine; he created the first automobile assembly line outside the United States. By 1927 Citroën was the leader car manufacturer in Europe, and fourth in the world. In addition to his engineering talents, he was also a skilled publicist. He organized a series of highly publicized automobile expeditions to remote parts of Africa, Asia and Australia, and, from 1925 until 1934, had a large illuminated Citroën sign on the side of the Eiffel Tower. The site of Citroën's old factory is now the Parc André Citroën.

During the early 20th century, the inner eleven arrondissements of Paris (with the exception of the 7th) became the centers of commerce; their populations were a smaller and smaller share of the total population of the city. About a quarter of Paris workers were engaged in commerce, wholesale and retail. The motors of the city economy were the great department stores, founded in the Belle Époque; Bon Marché, Galeries Lafayette, BHV, Printemps, La Samaritaine, and several others, grouped in the center. They employed tens of thousands of workers, many of them women, and attracted customers from around the world.

Coco Chanel in 1920

The 1920s were a glorious period for Paris high fashion. The 1925 Exposition of Decorative arts featured the work of seventy-two Paris fashion designers; the leading figures included Paul Poiret, Jeanne Lanvin, who opened a boutique in 1909 on the Rue du Faubourg Saint-Honoré, and who also branched out into perfume, introducing a fragrance called Arpège in 1927; and the House of Worth, which also introduced perfumes, with bottles designed by René Lalique. The reign of the old houses was challenged by the arrival of new designers, most notably Coco Chanel who put her own perfume, called Chanel No. 5 on the market in 1920. She introduced her famous "little black dress" in 1925. Other major Paris designers of the period included Jean Patou, Elsa Schiaparelli, Madeleine Vionnet, Cristóbal Balenciaga, who fled the Spanish Civil War and opened a shop on the Avenue George V in 1937; Jacques Heim, and Nina Ricci, who opened her shop in Paris in 1932.

By the late 1930s, the dismal economy had greatly reduced the number of customers. The fashion house of Paul Poiret, which had dominated Paris fashion before World War I, closed in 1929. In the Pavilion of Elegance at the 1937 Exposition, only twenty-nine designers remained to show their collections. During this period, the center of the Paris high fashion world gradually moved west from the center, closer to its wealthy clients; it became established around the Champs-Élysées, particularly on avenue Montaigne, rue Francois-I, rue Marbeuf and the rue du Faubourg-Sant-Honoré.

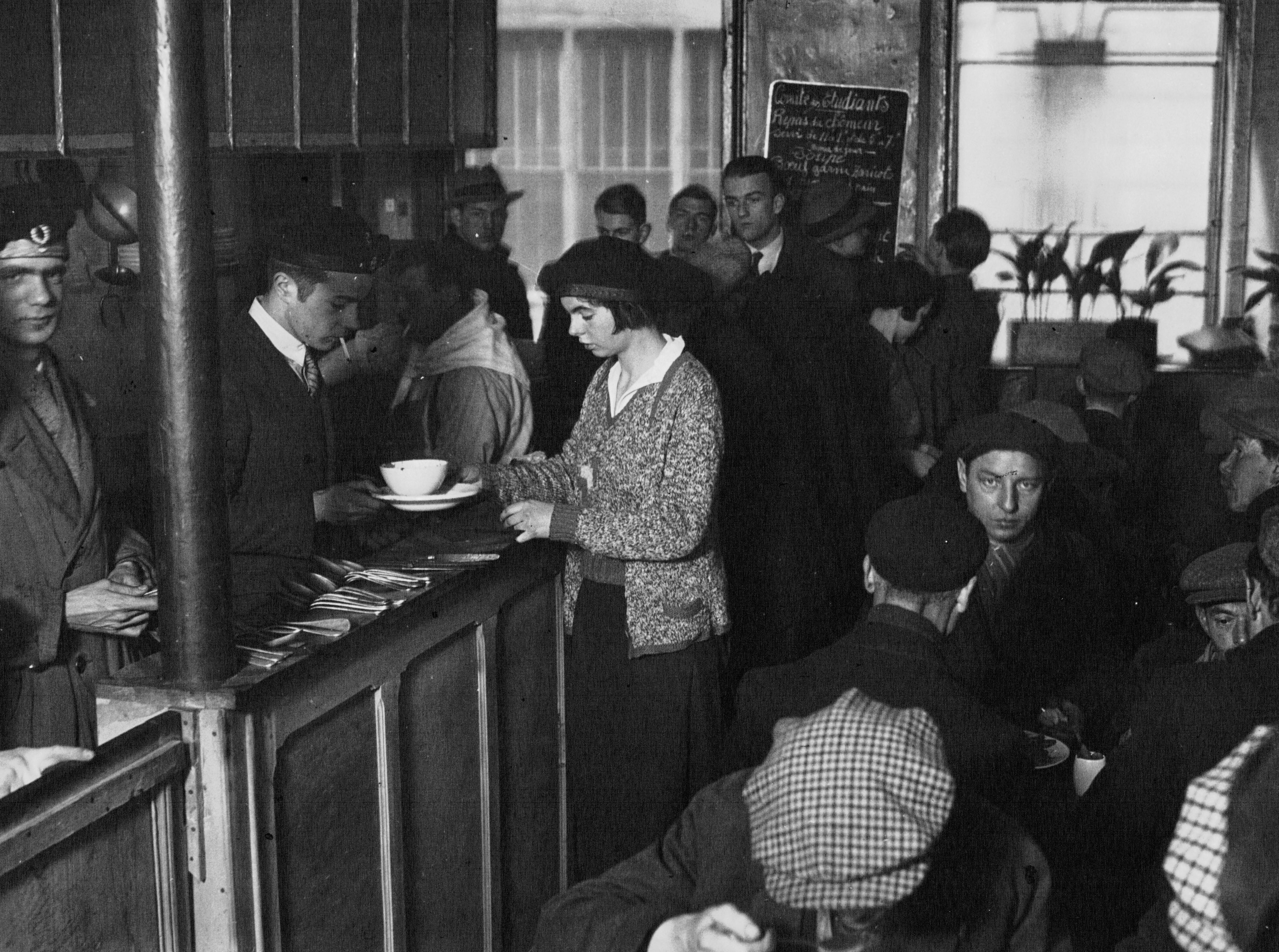
Soup kitchen for the unemployed (1932)

The stock market crash in New York in 1929 was the beginning of a series of economic downturns which reached Paris in 1931 and 1932. Paris factories produced more goods than European or American consumers could buy, and exports declined. As other European countries devalued their currencies to meet the crisis, French exports became too expensive, and factories cut back production and laid off workers. Fewer wealthy tourists came to Paris, reducing the demand for luxury goods. A socialist prime minister, Leon Blum, was elected in 1936, and formed a Popular Front government. He introduced a forty-hour week and two weeks of paid vacation for French workers, and devalued the Franc by 29 percent, but industrial production continued to fall and inflation erased the gains in salaries. A new government under radical politician Édouard Daladier took office in August 1938, and changed economic policies, encouraging investment and raising prices. Inflation stopped, the Franc stabilized, and production increased by 15 percent between November 1938 and June 1939. As the threat of war loomed, the government increased military spending, stimulating the economy further and increasing employment, until the beginning of the war in September 1939.

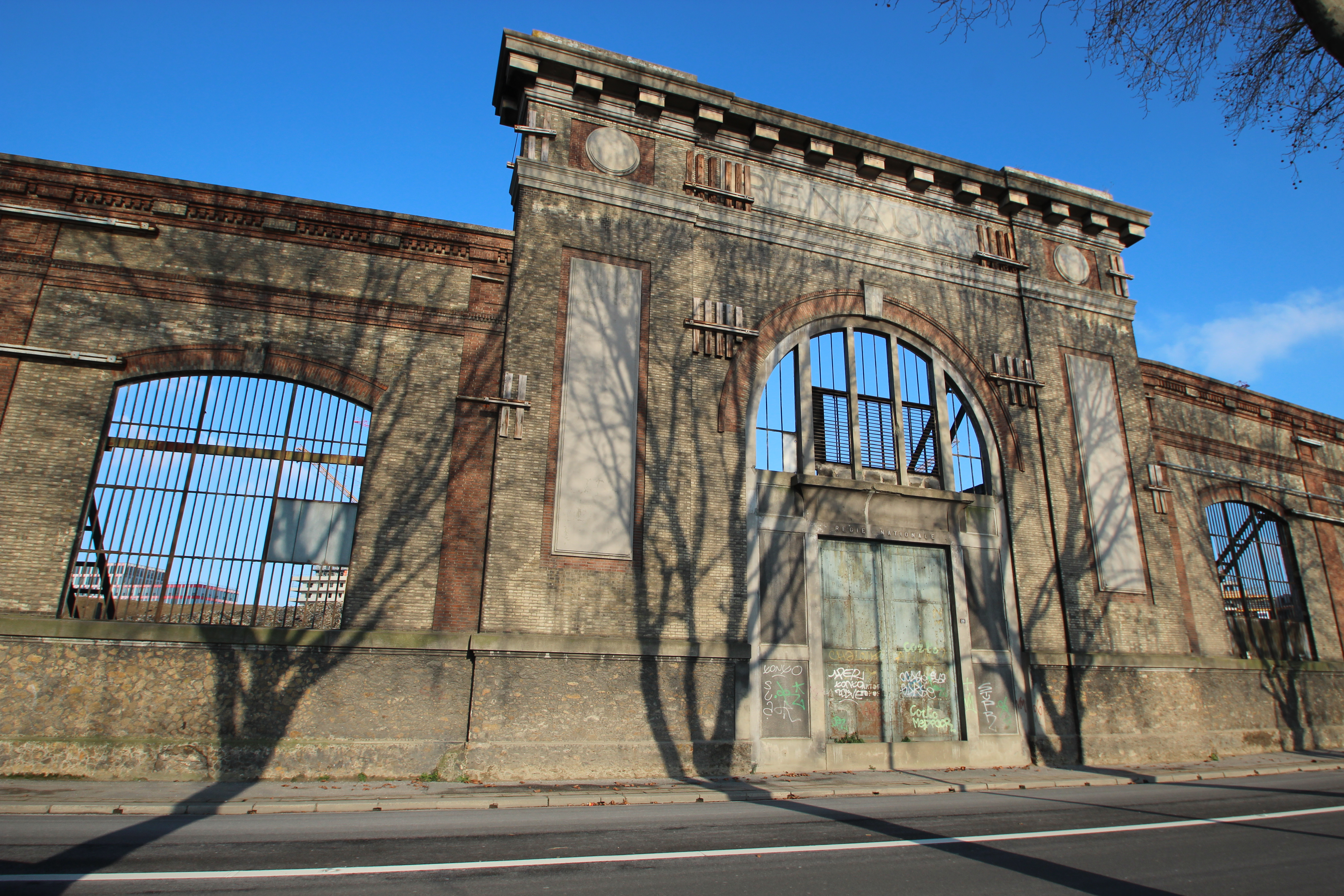
The gateway of the Renault Factory in Boulogne-Billancourt, once among the largest factories in the Paris Region, closed in 1992

World War II ruined the engines of the Paris economy; the factories, train stations and railroad yards around the city had been bombed by the Allies, there was little coal for heat, electricity was sporadic at best. Nonetheless, the reconstruction went ahead rapidly, aided by 2.6 billion dollars in grants and loans from the United States given under the Marshall Plan between 1948 and 1953, administered locally from the Hotel Talleyrand on the Place de la Concorde, which allowed France to finance two-thirds of its exterior debt and to buy new machinery for its factories.

Even before the war ended, the government had begun nationalizing much of the Paris industry; between 1944 and 1946 it nationalized the Renault factory, the coal mines and oil companies, Air France, and all the major banks and insurance companies. An important part of the planning of the new economy was conducted by Jean Monnet between 1946 and 1951; Monnet used the lessons learned to create the European Common Market. By 1948, French industrial production had come back to its prewar level. The 1950s were the beginning of the Trente Glorieuses, almost thirty years of rapid and steady growth. Between 1951 and 1968, the French economy grew at an average rate of 5 percent a year, reaching 6.5 percent between 1966 and 1968. The need for more workers led to increasing numbers of immigrants, coming mostly from North Africa on labor contracts.

In the 1970s, the Trente Glorieuses came to an end. Under the pressure from trade unions, salaries and the cost of production grew quickly (7.1 percent in 1969, 6.3 percent in 1970, 8.5 percent in 1973), even faster than inflation (4 percent between 1960 and 1968); gradually, even with increases in productivity, goods made in France were more expensive than those made in Germany, Britain, the United States and Japan. French industry had difficult being competitive, even with modernization. The Citroen assembly line in Paris had closed in the 1970s. The Renault assembly line at Billancourt, one of the biggest factories in the Paris Region, closed permanently in 1992. The rapid and unexpected increase in oil prices after the 1973 Arab-Israeli War also hit the French economy hard. In the early 1980s the cost of imports into France grew twice as quickly as the value of French exports. The Mitterrand government responded with a new wave of nationalizations of major French banks, industrial companies, and manufacturers including Thomson, Saint-Gobain, and Rhone-Poulenc. However, beginning 1986, the Mitterrand government decided to reverse course, and privatized most of the companies it had earlier taken over. Between 1983 and 1986, the unemployment rate passed 10 percent and the number of unemployed grew from 1.9 million to 2.5 million.

Between 1988 and 1995, the Paris economy recovered some of its earlier growth; inflation was kept low, labor costs grew less quickly, but unemployment remained stubbornly high, particularly in the Paris suburbs.

== Employment in the Paris Aire Urbaine (1999) ==
At the 1999 census, there were 5,089,179 persons employed in the Paris aire urbaine (or "metropolitan area"). At the same 1999 census, 4,949,306 people living in the Paris aire urbaine had a job. The almost 140,000 people difference between these two figures comes from an outflow of about 60,000 people living inside the aire urbaine who work outside of it, and an inflow of about 200,000 people living outside of the aire urbaine who come to work inside it every day. Thus, out of the 5,089,179 people employed in the Paris aire urbaine in 1999, only about 200,000 people (3.9% of the total) lived outside of it, which is not surprising since the boundaries of the aires urbaines are based on commuting patterns.

Well into the middle of the 20th century, the majority of jobs in the aire urbaine were concentrated in the city of Paris proper. However, after the Second World War the economic activity relocated to the suburbs, and the city has been steadily losing jobs to the benefit of the suburbs, in particular the Hauts-de-Seine (92) département, home of the new La Défense business district, to the west of the city proper. Today, the city of Paris is not properly speaking the economic centre of the aire urbaine since most of the offices are in fact located in the western half of the city proper and in the central portion of the Hauts-de-Seine département, forming a triangle between the Opéra, La Défense and the Val de Seine district. Hauts-de-Seine has become a sort of extension of central Paris, with 873,775 persons employed there in the end of 2005, more than half as many as in the city of Paris proper (1,653,551 persons employed in the city of Paris in the end of 2005).

As a consequence workers do not just commute from the suburbs to work in the city of Paris, but also come from the city of Paris to work in the suburbs. Of the 5,416,643 persons employed in the Paris Region in the end of 2005, only 1,653,551 (30.5%) worked inside the city of Paris proper, while 3,763,092 (69.5%) worked in the suburbs. However, once adding Hauts-de-Seine, the previous figures show that City of Paris and Hauts-de-Seine together still harboured 46.7% of all persons employed in the Paris Region in the end of 2005, which should help to put into perspective the phenomenon of job relocation to the suburbs: it was as much a relocation to the suburbs as an extension of central Paris beyond the administrative borders of the city.

During the 1960s and 1970s, the French government created several villes nouvelles ("new towns") on the outer ring of the Paris suburbs in order to multi-polarise the economy of the city. Economically speaking, those villes nouvelles have been a relative success since many companies are still moving into those areas today. However, they didn't completely fulfil their role of multi-polarisation: economic activities still remain in a large measure concentrated in the central core (City of Paris and Hauts-de-Seine) of the aire urbaine, as the above employment figures show.

=== By sector ===
The figures below, extracted from the 1999 census, show the distribution of the 5,089,179 persons employed in the Paris aire urbaine across the different economic sectors in the year 1999. This will give a sense of the extreme diversity of the Paris economy, marked nonetheless by the notable dominance of services.

- Primary sector: Agriculture, forestry, and fishing: 26,741 persons in employment (0.5% of total workforce)
- Secondary sector: Manufacturing and mining, construction, and utilities: 913,503 p. in emp. (17.9% of t. wf)
  - Manufacturing (includes mining and oil and gas extraction): 627,534 p. in emp. (12.3% of t. wf)
    The manufacturing industries employing most people are:
    - Electronic and electrical equipment, appliances, and components: 112,281 p. in emp. (2.2% of t. wf)
      This branch is made of: computers and peripheral equipment; mobile phones; radio and television broadcasting and wireless communications equipment; semiconductors and other electronic components; navigational, measuring, electro-medical, and control instruments; electrical engines; electric lighting equipment; miscellaneous electrical equipment (cables, transformers, switchboards, etc.). This branch DOES NOT include household electronic and electrical appliances (televisions, radios, DVD players, ovens, refrigerators, watches, clocks, etc.).
    - Publishing, printing, and reproduction of recorded media: 87,599 p. in emp. (1.7% of t. wf)
      Books, newspapers, magazines, etc. This branch DOES NOT include the motion picture and sound recording industries, neither does it include the broadcasting industries.
    - Foodstuff, beverages, and tobacco products manufacturing: 59,862 p. in emp. (1.2% of t. wf)
    - Machinery and equipment manufacturing: 56,270 p. in emp. (1.1% of t. wf)
      This branch is made of: engine, turbine, and power transmission equipment; pumps and compressors; material handling equipment; ventilation, heating, air-conditioning, and commercial refrigeration equipment; agriculture, construction, and mining machinery; machine tools; industrial moulds; industrial machinery (plastics and rubber industry machinery, textile machinery, etc.); and other general purpose machinery (welding and soldering equipment, industrial process furnaces and ovens, scales and balances (except laboratory), etc.). This branch DOES ALSO INCLUDE three industries generally listed under "Fabricated metal products manufacturing" in Anglo-Saxon classifications: architectural and structural metals manufacturing; boilers, tanks, and shipping containers; and arms and ammunitions.
    - Motor vehicles, trailers, and motor vehicle parts manufacturing ("car industry"): 52,149 p. in emp. (1.0% of t. wf)
  - Construction: 235,872 p. in emp. (4.6% of t. wf)
  - Utilities: Electricity, natural gas and water supply: 50,097 p. in emp. (1.0% of t. wf)
- Tertiary sector: Services: 4,148,935 p. in emp. (81.6% of t. wf)
  The services employing most people are:
  - Business services (include rental and leasing services): 841,157 p. in emp. (16.5% of t. wf)
    - Professional and technical services: 509,048 p. in emp. (10.0% of t. wf)
      This branch is made of: computer systems design and related services; data processing, hosting, and related services; software publishing; legal services; accounting, tax preparation, bookkeeping, and payroll services; management of companies and enterprises; administrative management and general management consulting; human resources and executive search consulting; marketing consulting; process, physical distribution, and logistics consulting; environmental consulting; advertising and related services; and architectural, engineering, and related services.
    - Administrative, support, and waste management services: 272,981 p. in emp. (5.4% of t. wf)
      This branch is made of: employment services (placement, temporary); investigation and security services; services to buildings and dwellings; photographic services; office administrative services; translation and interpretation services; business support services (call centres, collection agencies, etc.); packaging and labelling services; convention and trade show organisers; and waste management and remediation services. This branch DOES ALSO INCLUDE renting and leasing of machinery and equipment without operator and of personal and household goods, which is generally listed along with "Real estate" in Anglo-Saxon classifications.
    - Research and development: 59,128 p. in emp. (1.1% of t. wf)
  - Commerce: 660,843 p. in emp. (13.0% of t. wf)
    - Retail trade (except of motor vehicles) and repair: 308,323 p. in emp. (6.1% of t. wf)
    - Wholesale and commission trade (except of motor vehicles): 276,282 p. in emp. (5.4% of t. wf)
    - Sale, maintenance, and repair of motor vehicles: 76,238 p. in emp. (1.5% of t. wf)
  - Public administrations and defense: 510,972 p. in emp. (10.0% of t. wf)
  - Health services and social assistance: 451,373 p. in emp. (8.7% of t. wf)
  - Transportation, storage, and communications: 419,779 p. in emp. (8.2% of t. wf)
    This branch is made of: public and private transportation of passengers and freight; warehousing and storage; travel agencies; post and couriers; and telecommunications.
  - Education: 334,852 p. in emp. (6.6% of t. wf)
  - Finance and insurance: 256,722 p. in emp. (5.0% of t. wf)
  - Accommodation and food services (hotels and restaurants): 202,228 p. in emp. (4.0% of t. wf)

== Commerce and finance ==
Commerce: 660 843 employees Retail stores (except automobiles) and repair: 308 323 employees Wholesale and commissions (except cars): 276 282 employees Sale, maintenance, and repair of automobiles: 76,238 employees Public administration and defense: 510 972 employees

== Brexit ==
After Brexit, the European Banking Authority was relocated to Paris.
