= René Bérenger =

French politician and judge (1830–1915)

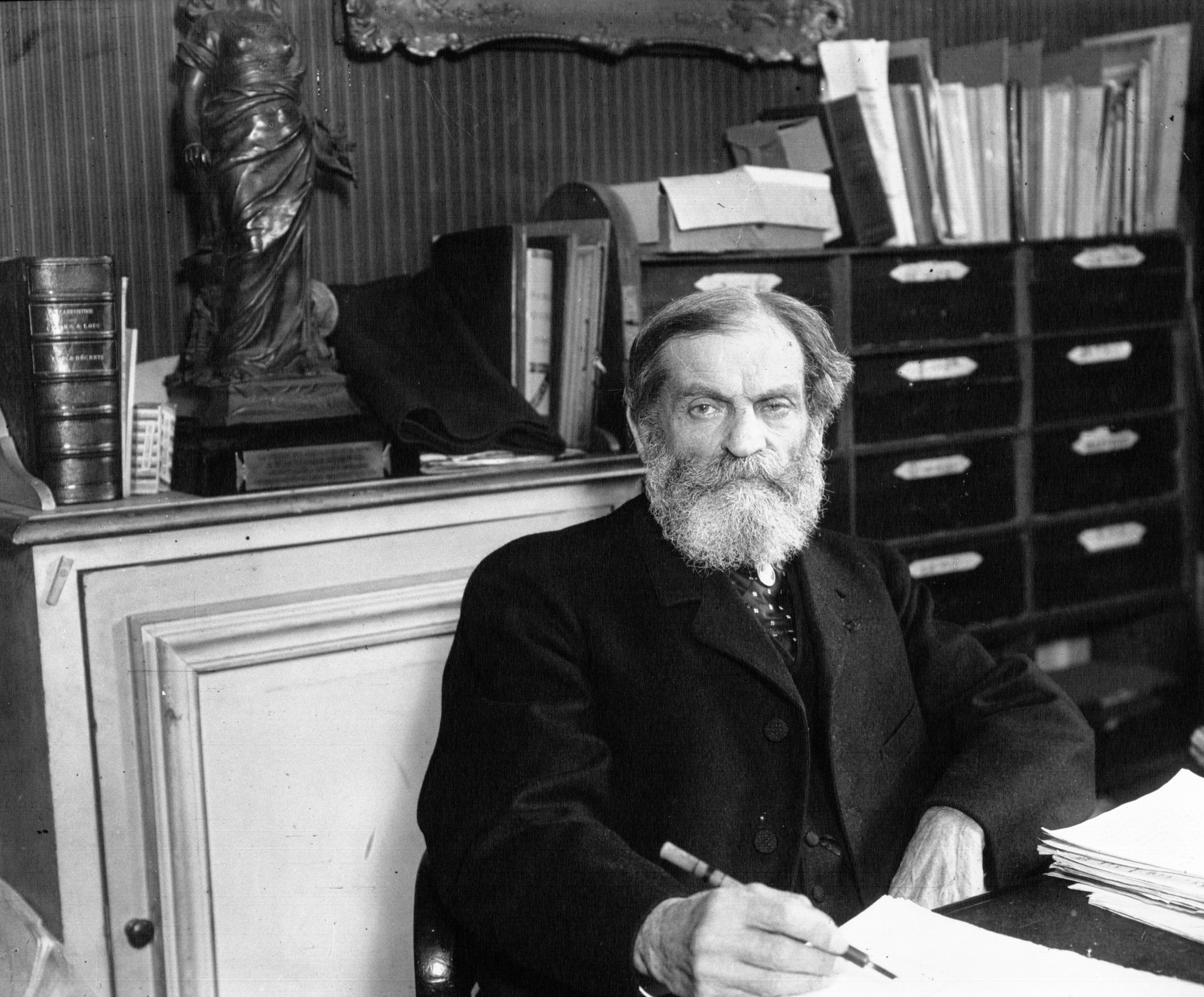
René Bérenger,1910

René Bérenger, born in Bourg-lès-Valence (Drôme) on 22 April 1830 and died Alincourt (Ardennes) on 29 August 1915, was a French lawyer, judge, and politician.

== Life ==
He was the son of Alphonse-Marie-Marcellin-Thomas Bérenger, and followed his father into the legal profession. At the outbreak of the Franco-Prussian War in 1870, he was Avocat général of Lyon but resigned to enlist as a volunteer. He was wounded at Nuits on 28 December and was later awarded the Legion of Honour.

Returned to the National Assembly by the département of Drôme as a member of the Centre gauche parliamentary group, he was for a few days in 1873 minister of public works under Jules Armand Dufaure. He then was made a Senator for life, and was vice president of the French Senate from 1894 to 1897.

In 1871 he founded a society for the reclamation of discharged prisoners, and presided over various bodies formed to secure improvement of the public morals. He succeeded Charles Lucas in 1890 at the Académie des Sciences Morales et Politiques. Laws introduced in 1885 and 1891 that bear his name concern, respectively, parole and suspended sentences.
