= Charles (Jean-Marie) Lucas =

French prison reformer (1803–1889)

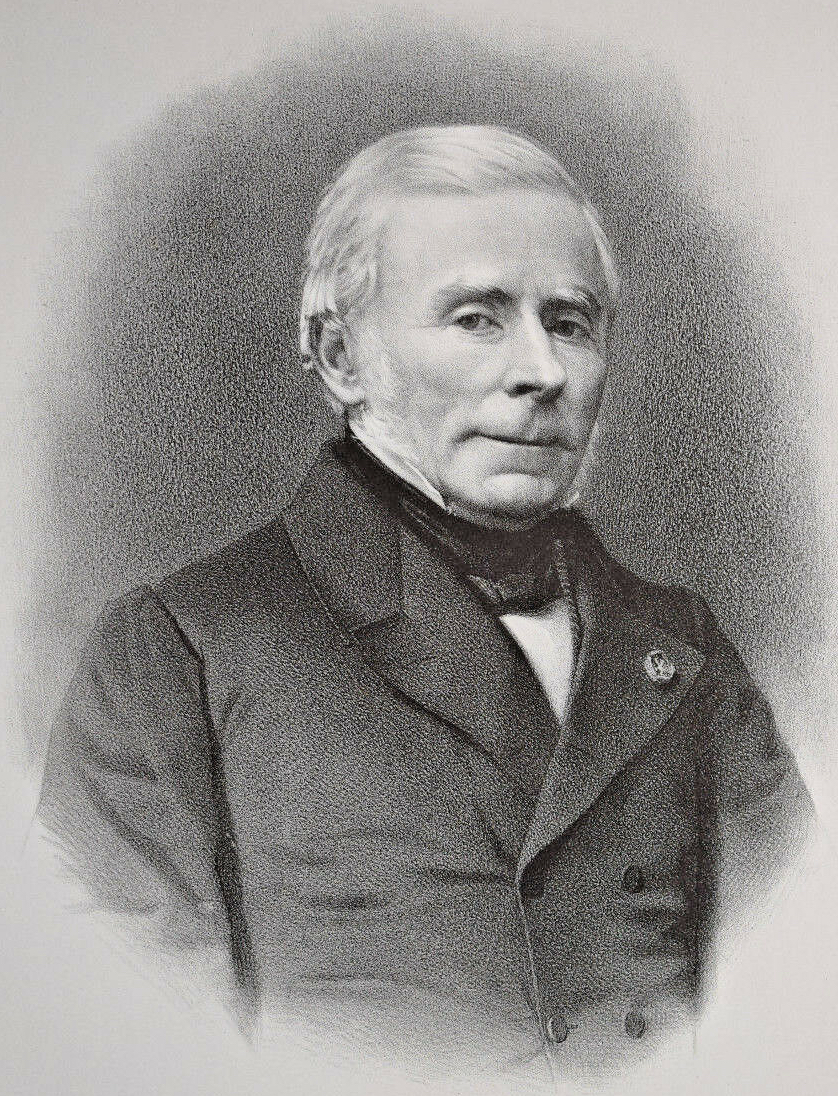
Charles Lucas

Charles (Jean-Marie) Lucas, born in Saint-Brieuc, on 9 May 1803, died in Paris on 20 December 1889) was a French prison reformer.

Lucas was a French jurist and administrator, author of many books and articles on the abolition of the death penalty, the theory of preventive detention, law enforcement and imprisonment, and finally the civilization of war.

== Biography ==
=== Early years (1803-1830) ===
Charles Lucas was born in Saint-Brieuc, in northeast of France, in a family of notables. His father, Antoine Charles Lucas, after a long period of having governmental jobs, gained a fortune that allowed him to send young Lucas to finish his studies in Paris.

Charles Lucas followed his studies at the Royal College of Bourbon. In September 1820 while he was still a student, he began to recite poems on the birth of Henri, Count of Chambord the Duke of Bordeaux. The school headmaster, then, kept him on a close eye. In 1821. he enrolled at the School of Law.

=== Academy of Moral and Political Sciences ===
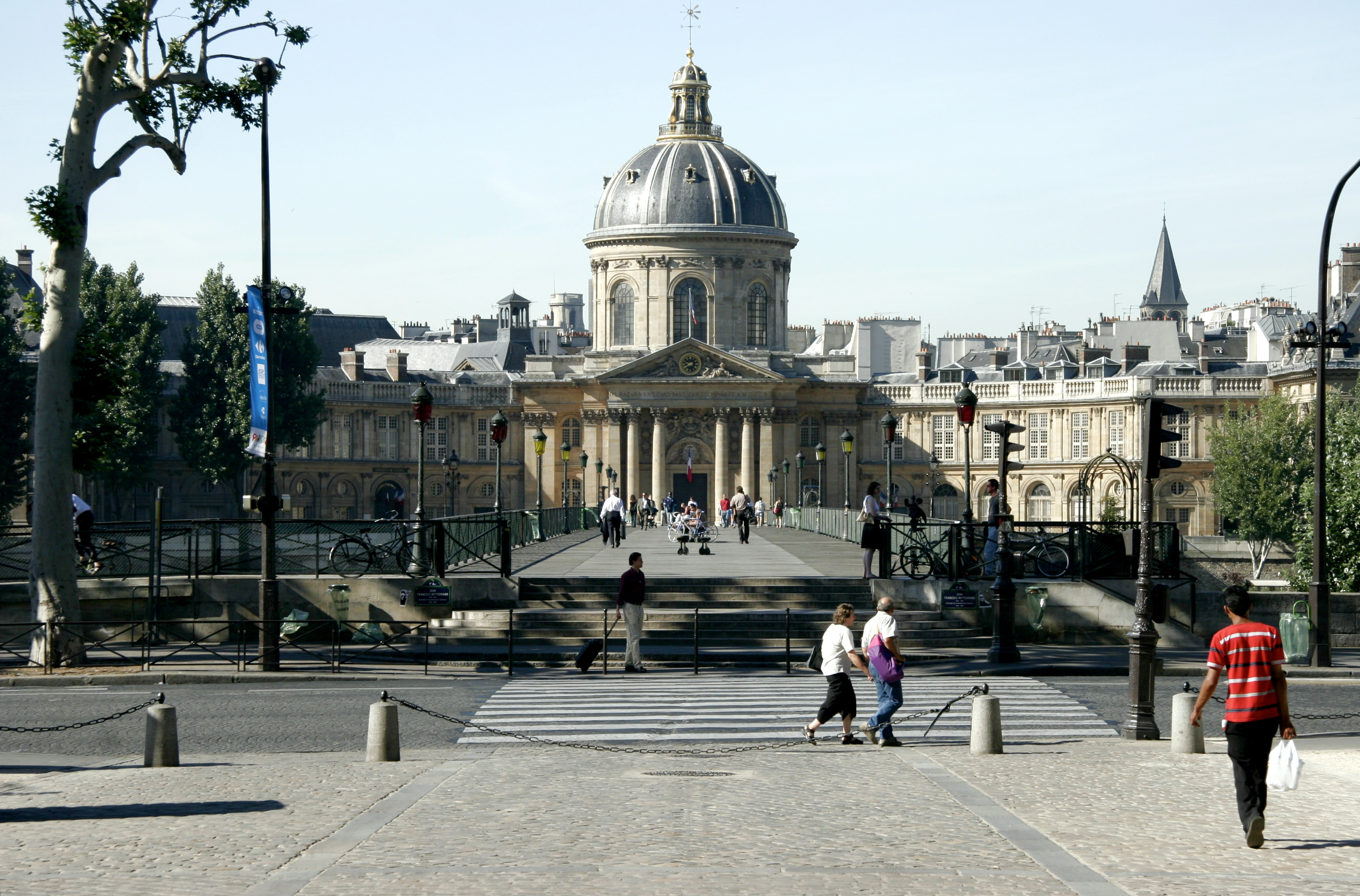
Institut de France from the Louvre Museum facing the Pont des Arts.

Lucas succeeded Pierre-Louis Roederer in Chair 4 of the Académie des sciences morales et politiques in 1836. He obtained 10 votes against 6 for Alexis de Tocqueville, then 13 against 8. In 1890, René Bérenger (1830-1915) succeeded him. In 1836, Charles Lucas was president of the Council (organized by him) of general inspectors of prisons. Lucas dedicated his career and his life to three major reforms: the abolition of capital punishment; the theory of preventive, punitive and penitentiary imprisonment; and finally the civilization of war.

=== Inspector General of Prisons (1830-1865) ===
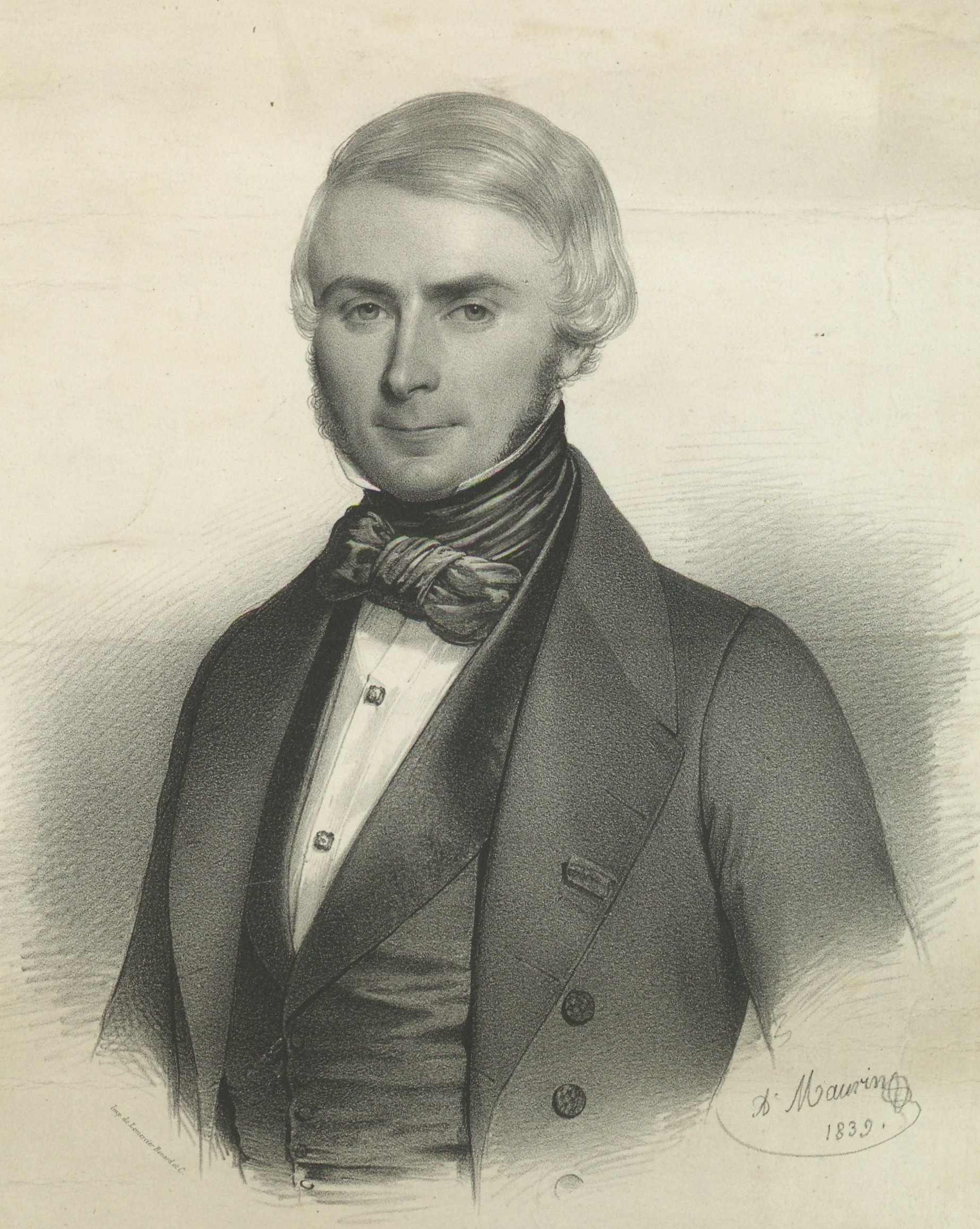
Portrait of Charles Lucas, 1839

Noted for his writing on the abolition of the capital punishment and the prison system, Charles Lucas was appointed, the day after the July Revolution, inspector general of prisons (1830-1865).

A company was formed in 1833 following the example, but on broader bases, of a similar establishment already founded in Strasbourg. Beneficial men, Chamber of Peers (France), deputies, Conseiller d'État, magistrates, citizens, responding to the call of Charles Lucas.

=== Later years ===
In 1865, Charles Lucas, suffering from blindness, ceased his professional activities. He nevertheless continued to actively follow the development of penitentiary institutions, writing brochures and articles, participating in major penitentiary congresses and to official committees. That year, he presented at the Institut de France an important account of the program, the importance and the results of the abolitionist movement in Europe.

== Works ==
- De la réforme des prisons ou de la théorie de l’emprisonnement, (1836-1838);
- De l'emprisonnement individuel sous le rapport sanitaire et des attaques contre lui;
- Du système pénal et du système répressif en général, de la peine de mort (1826);
- Du système pénitentiaire en Europe et aux Etats-Unis (1834);
- Exposé de l'état de la question pénitentiaire en Europe et aux Etats-Unis, suivi d’observations de Tocqueville;
- Appendice à la théorie de l'emprisonnement, ou Réponse aux écoles opposantes en général, et à l'école pennsylvanienne en particulier; suivi de Quelques mots sur la réforme des prisons de la France;
- Conclusion générale de l'ouvrage sur le Système pénitentiaire en Europe et aux États-Unis; suivie de la Deuxième pétition aux Chambres sur la nécessité de l'adoption du système pénitentiaire.
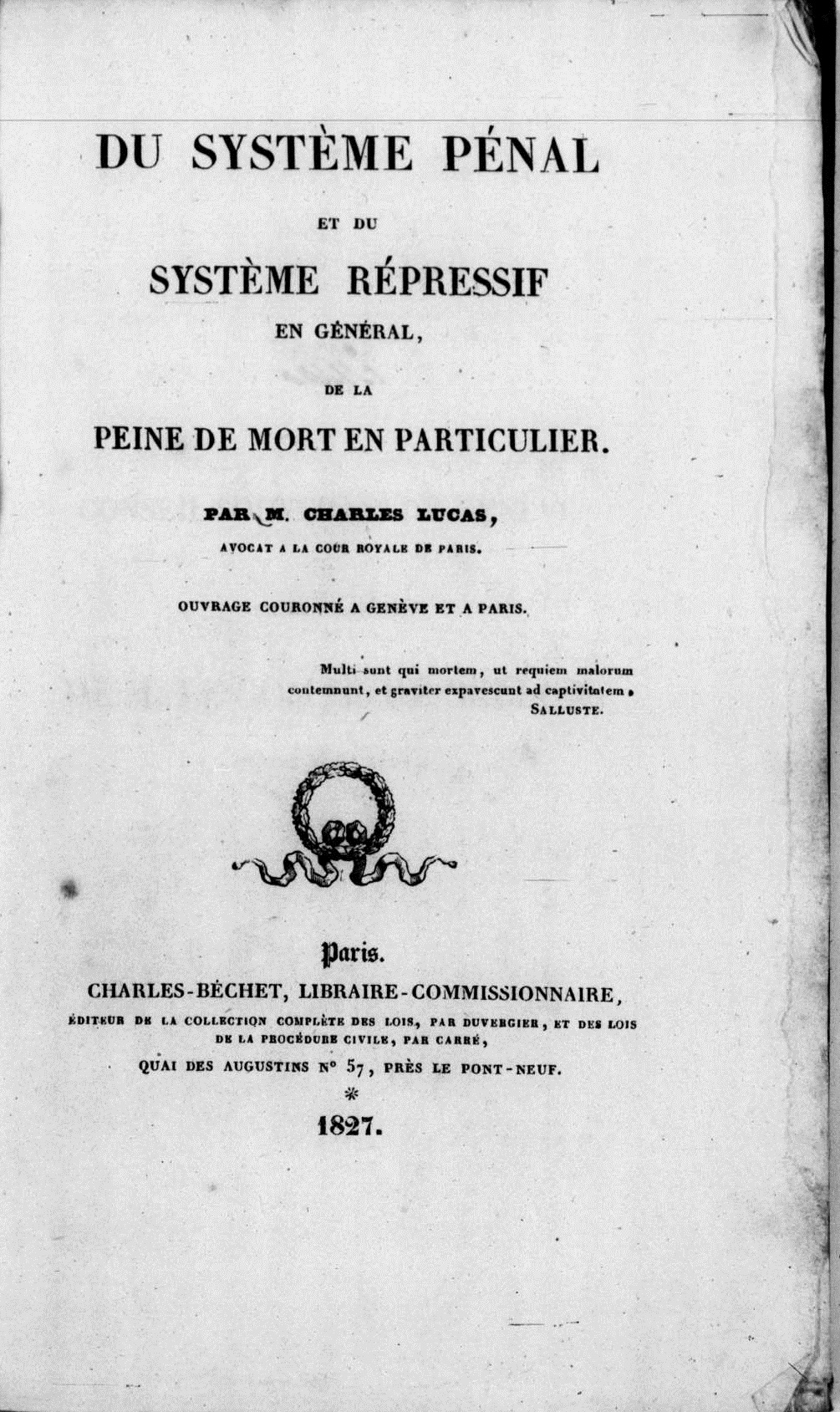
Du systeme penal et du systeme repressif en general, de la peine de mort en particulier, 1827
