= Victor Prunelle =

French physician and politician

Clément François-Victor Gabriel Prunelle (23 June 1777, La Tour-du-Pin – 20 August 1853) was a French medical doctor who served as the mayor of Lyon from 1830 to 1839.
