= Jean Vatout =

French poet and historian

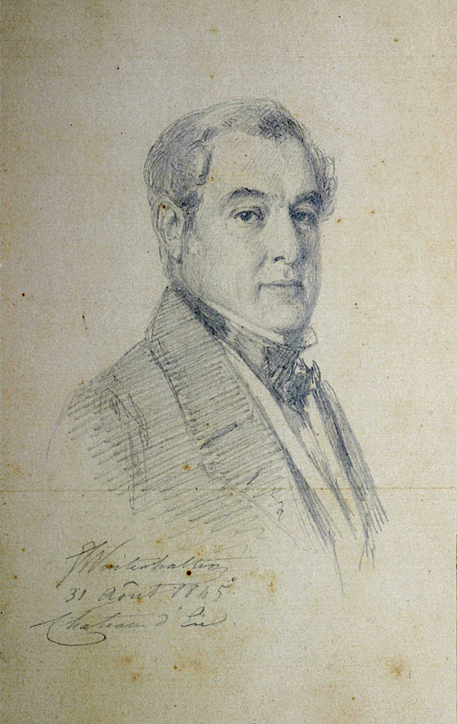
Jean Vatout, drawn at the Château d'Eu on August 31, 1845, by Franz Xaver Winterhalter

Jean Vatout (French pronunciation: [ʒɑ̃ vatu]; 26 May 1791 – 3 November 1848) was a French poet and historian.

Vatout was born in Villefranche-sur-Saône. He was the tenth member elected to occupy seat 4 of the Académie française in January 1848. He died, aged 57, at Claremont, England.
