= Gabriel Jars =

Gabriel Jars (26 January 1732 – 20 August 1769) sometimes confusingly referred to as Antoine-Gabriel Jars but more correctly as Gabriel Jars the younger was a French mining and metallurgical specialist who along with his brother Gabriel Jars the elder (1729-1808) contributed to knowledge on mining with his three volume work Voyages métallurgiques published posthumously from 1774 to 1781 by his brother Gabriel Jars the elder. The introduction of coke to smelting processes in France was made through his studies of techniques used in England.

Jars was born in Lyon, Lyonnais in a mining family, son of Gabriel Jars (d. 1770) and Jeanne-Marie Valioud. The family was in the copper business and quarried pyrite near Saint-Bel and Chessy. He was the third son after Antoine-Gabriel (1728-1795), and Gabriel the elder (1729-1808). He also had three sisters. Jars was educated at the Grand College, Lyon (Lycée Ampère) and then went to work with his father in the mining industry. In 1747, the École des Ponts et Chaussées (school of bridges and mines) was established and he was sent there to study in 1754. Daniel Charles Trudaine (1703-1769) who was in charge of the mining industry picked two graduates Guillot Duhamel and Jars to visit and study mines around France and Europe. In 1756 Jars went to mines and smelting industries in Saxony, Bohemia, Austria, Tyrol, Styria and Carinthia. In 1764 he also visited Newcastle and the border of Scotland. Returning in 1765 he made six reports including on the use of coke in smelting. His next tour was through Liege, Holland, Hanover, Saxony, Sweden and Norway. In 1768 he travelled through France to provide his knowledge to industrial centres. In 1769 a coke blast furnace was set up in Le Creusot. Jars died from sunstroke at Clermont after visiting the basalts near Langeac. Gabriel Jars the elder was a correspondent of the French Academy of Sciences (elected 1761) and it was he who published the third volume.
