= Alphonse-Marie Bérenger =

French lawyer and politician (1785–1866)

Alphonse-Marie–Marcellin–Thomas Bérenger (31 May 1785 – 1 May 1866), known as Thomas Bérenger or Berenger de la Drôme, was a French lawyer and politician. He was the son of a deputy of the Third Estate of Dauphiné to the Constituent Assembly.

== Life ==
He was born in Valence. He entered the magistracy and became procureur général at Grenoble, but resigned this office on the Bourbon Restoration. He then devoted himself mainly to the study of criminal law, and in 1818 published La justice criminelle en France, in which with great courage he attacked the special tribunals, provosts' courts or military commissions which were the main instruments of the Reaction, and advocated a return to the old common law and trial by jury. The book had a considerable effect in discrediting the reactionary policy of the government; but it was not until 1828, when Bérenger was elected to the chamber, that he had an opportunity of exercising a personal influence on affairs as a member of the group known as that of constitutional opposition.

His courage, as well as his moderation, was again displayed during the revolution of 1830, when, as president of the parliamentary commission for the trial of the ministers of Charles X, he braved the fury of the mob and secured a sentence of imprisonment in place of the death penalty for which they clamoured.

His position in the chamber became one of much influence, and he had a large share in the modelling of the new constitution, though his effort to secure a hereditary peerage failed. Above all he was instrumental in framing the new criminal code, based on more humanitarian principles, which was issued in 1835. It was due to him that, in 1832, the right, so important in actual French practice, was given to juries to find "extenuating circumstances" in cases when guilt involved the death penalty. In 1831 he had been made a member of the court of appeal (cour de cassation), and the same year was nominated a member of the Academy of Political and Moral Sciences (Académie des Sciences Morales et Politiques).

He was raised to the peerage in 1839. This status he lost owing to the revolution of 1848 which ended his career as a politician. As a judge, however, his activity continued. He was president of the high courts of Bourges and Versailles in 1849. Having been appointed president of one of the chambers of the court of appeal, he devoted himself entirely to judicial work until his retirement, under the age limit, on 31 May 1860.

He now withdrew to his native town, and occupied himself with his favorite work of reform of criminal law. In 1833, he had shared in the foundation of a society for the reclamation of young criminals, in which he continued to be actively interested to the end. In 1851 and 1852, on the commission of the academy of moral sciences, he had travelled in France and England for the purpose of examining and comparing the penal systems in the two countries. The result was published in 1855 under the title La Répression pénale, comparaison du système pénitentiaire en France et en Angleterre.

His son, René Bérenger, continued the work of his father.

== Honours ==
- 1833: Officer of the Order of Leopold.
