= Hippolyte Ganneron =

French politician and businessman (1792–1847)

Auguste Victor Hippolyte Ganneron (* May 22, 1792 in Paris † May 23, 1847 in Paris) was a French politician and businessman. Originally a candle manufacturer, he also served several terms in the chambre des députés, the lower house of the French Parliament as a deputy for the département Seine and founded the Comptoir Ganneron to work as a private banker in 1844.

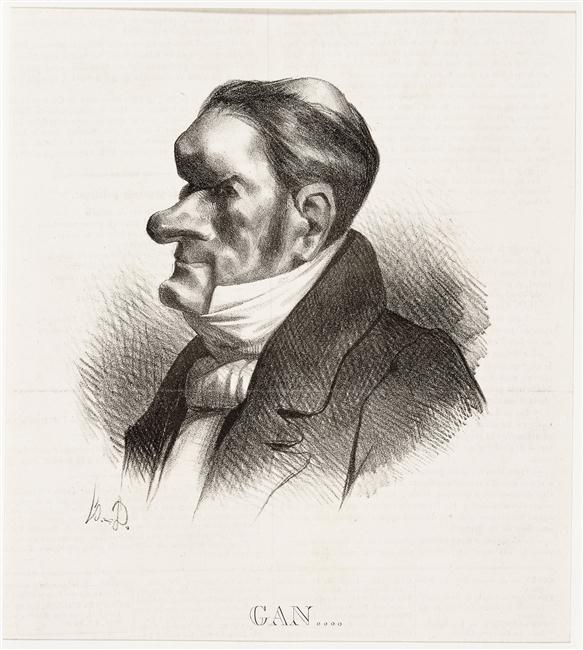
Ganneron by Honore Daumier, 1833
