= Pear (caricature) =

Caricature by Charles Philipon

Transformation of Louis-Philippe into a pear based on the "croquades" (Note: Just like the older and less motivated term croquis, "croquade" refers to the act of sketching or drawing quickly from life, as exemplified by Jacques-Louis David's drawing of Marie-Antoinette being led to the scaffold. During the July Monarchy, the term meant "a sketch made at even lower cost than a croquis," before acquiring, by the end of the 19th century, the meaning of "a witty sketch freely and vividly executed.") by Charles Philipon, republished in a modified form in 1834.

The caricature of Louis-Philippe I as a pear, created by Charles Philipon in 1831 and published in La Caricature under the title La Poire the same year, gained widespread popularity during the July Monarchy and remains linked to the king.

The symbol's popularity does not stem from any pre-existing association of the pear with a specific meaning, but rather from its graphic design. It is often mistakenly attributed to Honoré Daumier, though Charles Philipon claimed authorship, first using the image in November 1831 during a trial concerning press freedom. Although the government had recognized this freedom after the Trois Glorieuses, it was reluctant to uphold it.

As a result, the pear became a symbol of the "war of Philipon against Philippe"—the struggle of a small group of satirical press artists to defend republican values. It also served as an emblem of Louis-Philippe and his regime, layered with multiple levels of meaning. The widespread success of the symbol contributed to the re-establishment of press censorship in 1835.

After disappearing for a time, the pear reappeared during the revolution of 1848 and again in 1871. Detached from Louis-Philippe, it evolved into a symbol representing authority and political power, as well as the shift toward bourgeois policies.

== Contextualization of the Pear ==
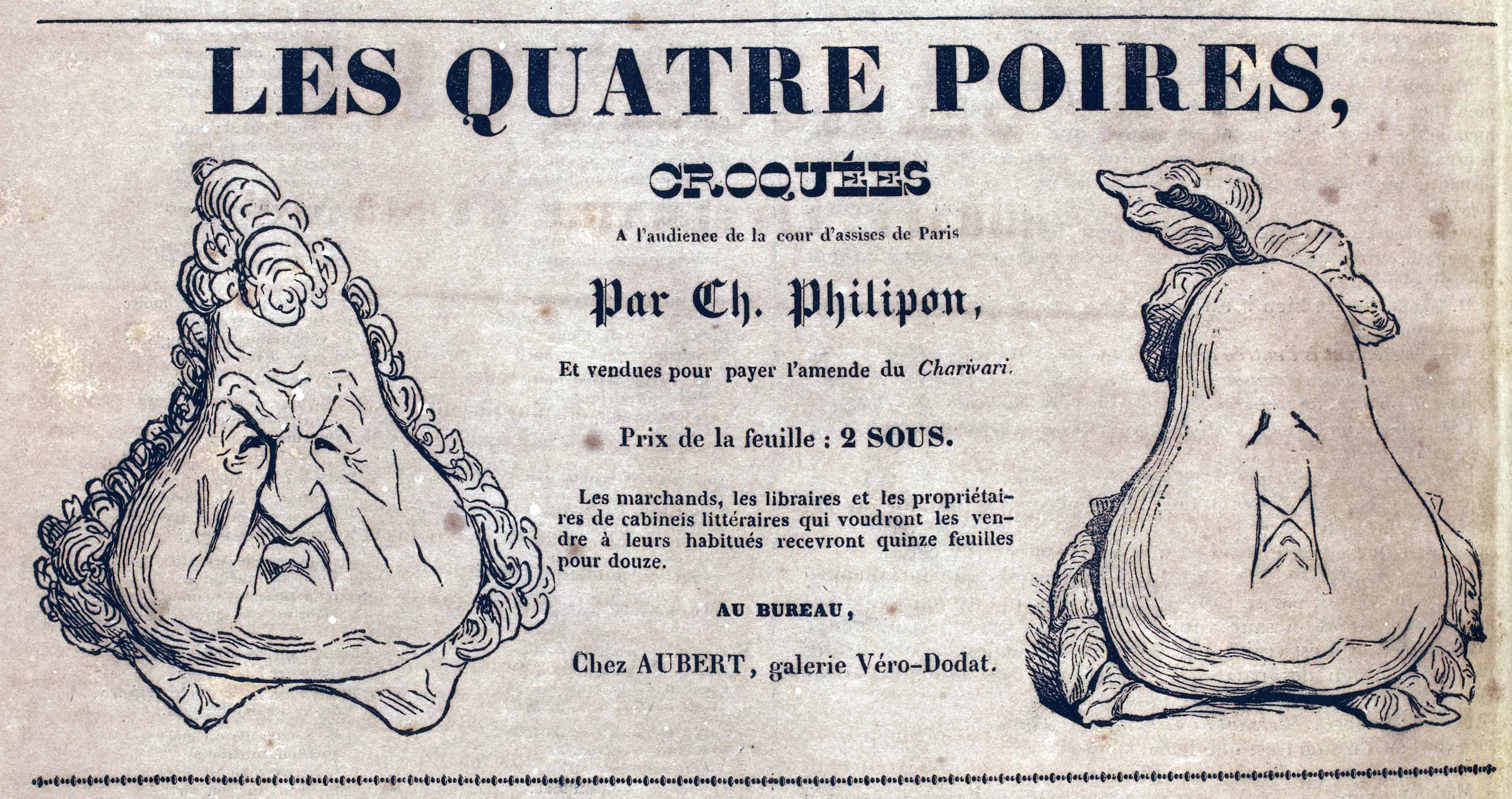
Advertisement from 1834 in La Caricature

The pear became closely associated with King Louis-Philippe and is considered an emblem of the July Monarchy. This association has led to two common misconceptions: the belief that "pear" referred to a fool at the time, justifying its use, and the incorrect attribution of the emblem's creation to Honoré Daumier, when Charles Philipon claiming it as his own.

=== Metaphorical meaning of the pear before Philipon ===
Many authors have assumed that, during the July Monarchy, the term poire (pear) referred to a fool, which may have influenced Philipon's choice. For instance, Ernst Kris and Ernst Gombrich suggested that the pear carried a pejorative meaning in "Parisian slang", symbolizing an idiot or a "fathead". Edwin DeTurck Bechtel also argued that a pear symbolized "a head or a face, a fool or an idiot." Similarly, Nicola Cotton contended that Philipon's caricatures "reinforced a preexisting connection", suggesting that their success would be inexplicable if this association had not been immediately understood.

However, the reference works supporting the notion of poire (pear) as slang for a fool are from after the July Monarchy, such as Henri Bauche's work, which Gabriel Weisberg cited. This anachronism led James Cuno to conclude that the connotation of foolishness does not hold when examining contemporary slang dictionaries, and that this meaning emerged only after Philipon's caricatures. Nevertheless, Cuno suggested that there were other pre-existing connotations related to the pear, though these were more sexual in nature, and he proposed that "the history of the pear as an erotic emblem remains to be written." (Note: The historian Massimo Montanari asserts that from the Middle Ages to the 17th century, the pear was associated "with civil urbanity and aristocracy: its fragility, delicacy, and short period of consumption maturity... nourished the aristocratic culture of collection." According to him, erotic connotations were added to the refined and socially elevated image of the pear, particularly through the motif of fruit exchanges between lovers, as exemplified by Tommaso Campanella's sonnet On a Gift of Pears Sent to the Author by His Mistress and Bitten by Her Teeth.)

To understand the connotations associated by Philipon's audience with the pear, James Cuno proposes considering two paronyms with slang meanings: on the one hand, poivre and its derivatives (poivrade, poivrer, and poivrière), which evoke syphilis and the transmission of venereal diseases, and on the other hand, poireau, which refers to the penis. According to Cuno, these associations are crucial for understanding the joke in Balzac's Le Père Goriot, in which Vautrin, depicted as homosexual, mocks Father Poiret's attraction to Mademoiselle Michonneau. Vautrin points out that Poiret "derives from poire", to which Bianchon responds: "[Poire] soft! [...] You would then be between the pear and the cheese." Cuno argues that this joke hinges on the pear's phallic connotations, suggesting that it evokes the specter of homosexuality. The humor, according to Cuno, is possible only if the pear carries these phallic associations, which could then be used against Vautrin's own homosexuality.

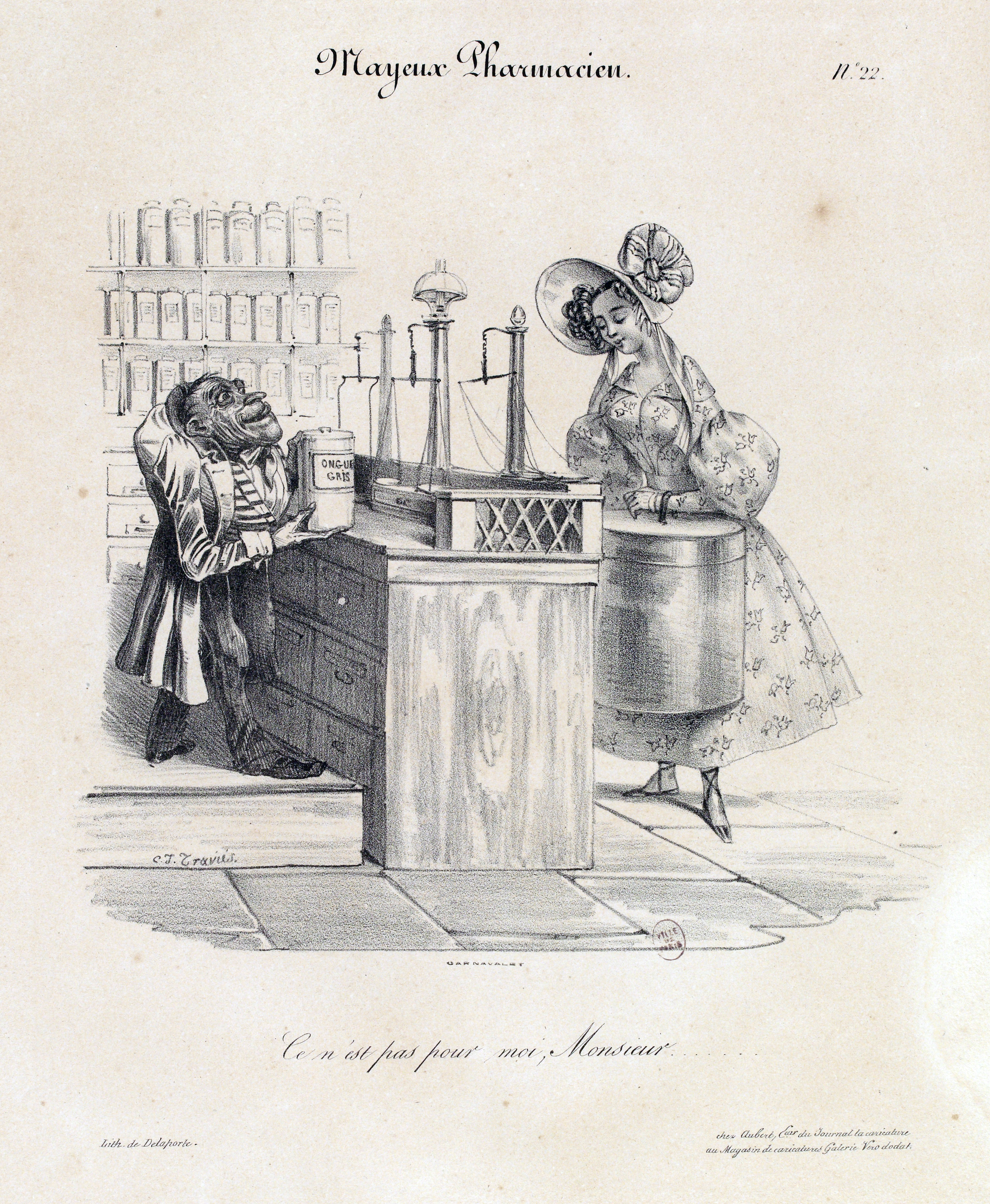
Mayeux pharmacist. Traviès, 1831.

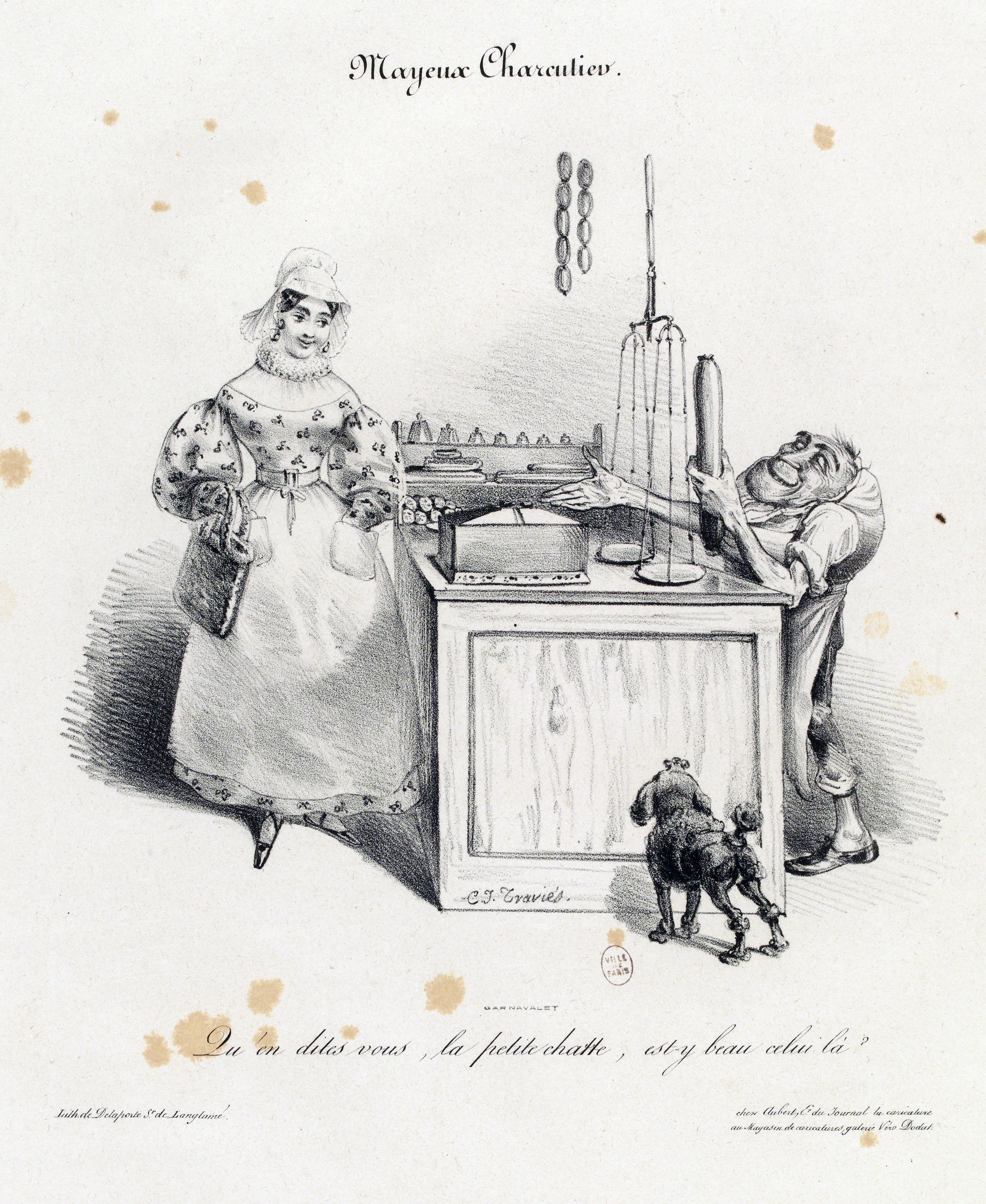
Mayeux charcutier, Traviès, 1831.

Two lithographs by Traviès exploit saucy innuendos, close to the paronyms of the pear. The first depicts a tart buying ointment and claiming that she is not the "pepper pot" without convincing Mayeux, while the second, more explicit, shows the latter praising a sausage whose meaning is close to that of leek.

However, Fabrice Erre, agreeing with Cuno that the association with stupidity developed later, argues, based on contemporary dictionaries, (Note: The term "poire" (pear) does not appear in Étienne Platt's Dictionnaire grammatical du mauvais langage ou Recueil des expressions et des phrases vicieuses usitées en France et notamment à Lyon (1805), L. Platt's Dictionnaire critique et raisonné du langage vicieux ou réputé vicieux (1835), or Alfred Delvau's Dictionnaire érotique moderne (1853). Similarly, it is absent from the Dictionnaire du bas-langage ou des Manières de parler usitées parmi le peuple (1809), Dictionnaire d'argot, ou Guide des gens du monde (1827), and Nouveau dictionnaire d'argot de Bras-de-fer (1829). However, slang dictionaries from the late 19th century give "poire" the meaning of "head." This is the case with Lucien Rigaud's Dictionnaire d'argot moderne (1881), Charles Virmaître's Dictionnaire d'argot fin-de-siècle (1894), and Gustave-Armand Rossignol's Dictionnaire d'argot (1901).) that there were no sexual connotations linked to the pear at the time. Erre suggests that, before Philipon's use of the symbol in 1831, the pear did not carry any significant meaning.

While the absence of slang meanings for poire in dictionaries prior to Philipon's use does not settle the debate, the Historical Dictionary of the French Language suggests that the equivalence between a head and a fruit, such as a pear, is a "commonplace" idea, whether referring to a pear, an apple, a lemon, or a strawberry.

There are a few early 19th-century examples of the pear shape being used in caricature, although these did not carry the same associations with stupidity or sexual innuendo. Ségolène Le Men argues that comparing these early uses of the pear with its later use as an emblem for Louis-Philippe reveals two dominant, yet contradictory, elements: emptiness and fullness, with the pear being "full of emptiness."

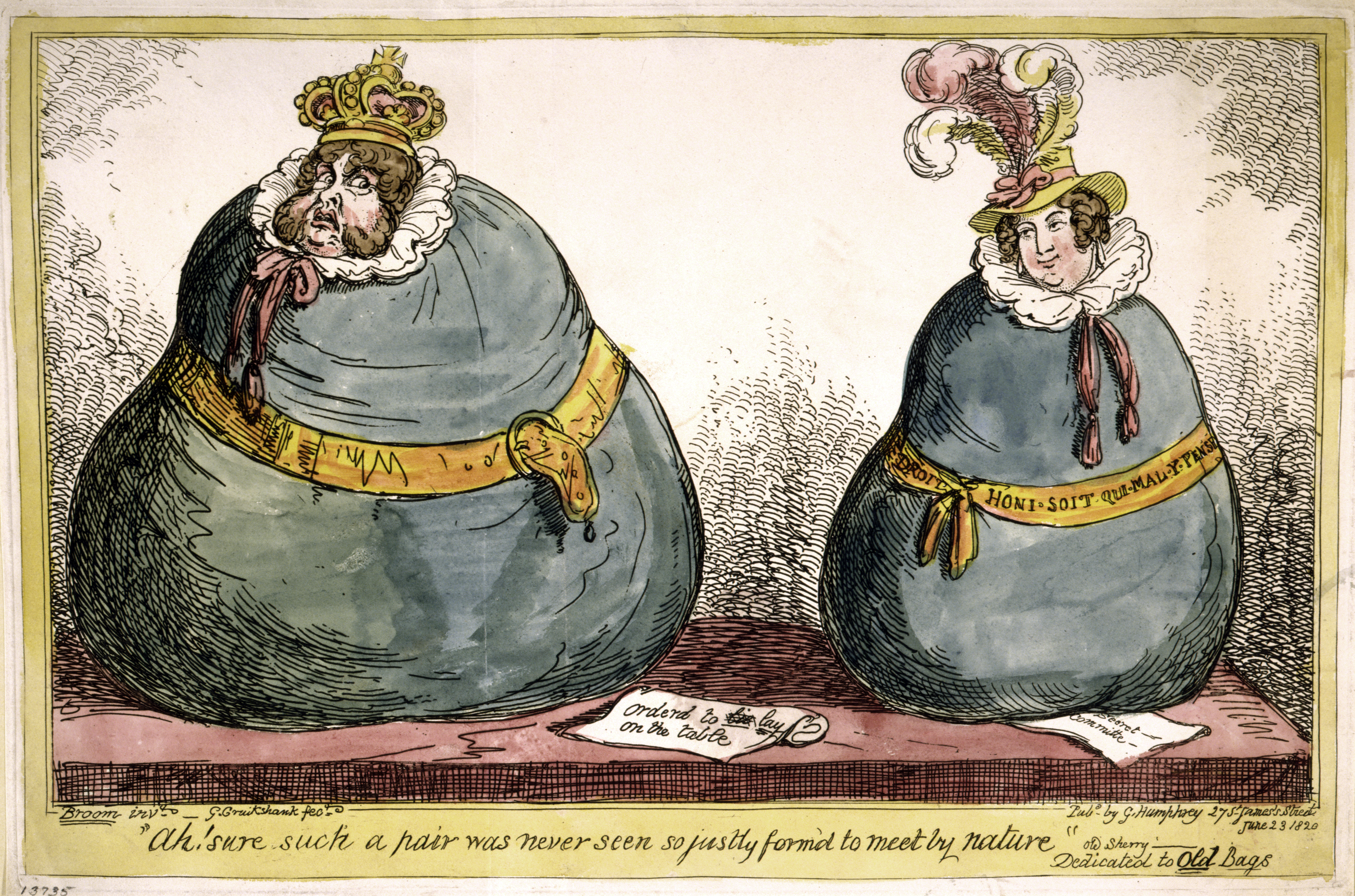
Caricature of George IV and Caroline of Brunswick. George Cruikshank, 1820.

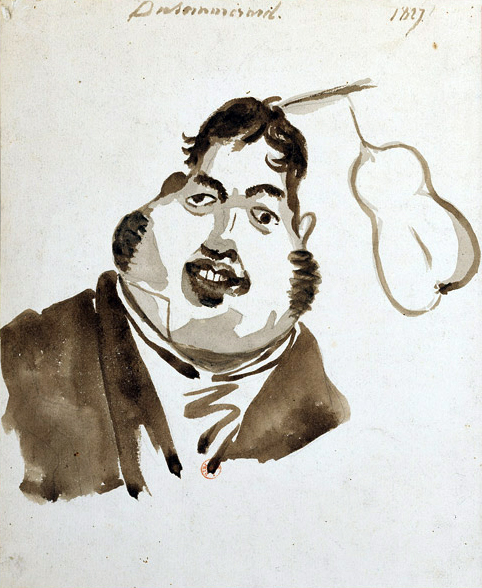
Caricature of Alexandre Du Sommerard. Jean-Baptiste Isabey, c. 1827.

Various uses of the pear shape attest to its use in caricature at the beginning of the 19th century, aimed at taking advantage of formal analogies without particularly denoting imbecility, notably in George Cruikshank, who may have inspired the Pear, and Jean-Baptiste Isabey.

Beyond these isolated caricature precedents, the broader use of the pear in visual culture did not initially suggest its later prominence in caricature, particularly in the 1831 context. On the contrary, the pear was also a recurring symbol in Christian imagery, often associated with the Madonna and the theme of gentleness. The pear provided an alternative to the apple, which was historically viewed as representing original sin. The pear's more positive symbolism was reflected in works like Peytel's Physiologie de la poire (1832), where the pear is humorously associated with aphrodisiac qualities, suggesting it was the pear, not the apple, that tempted Eve.

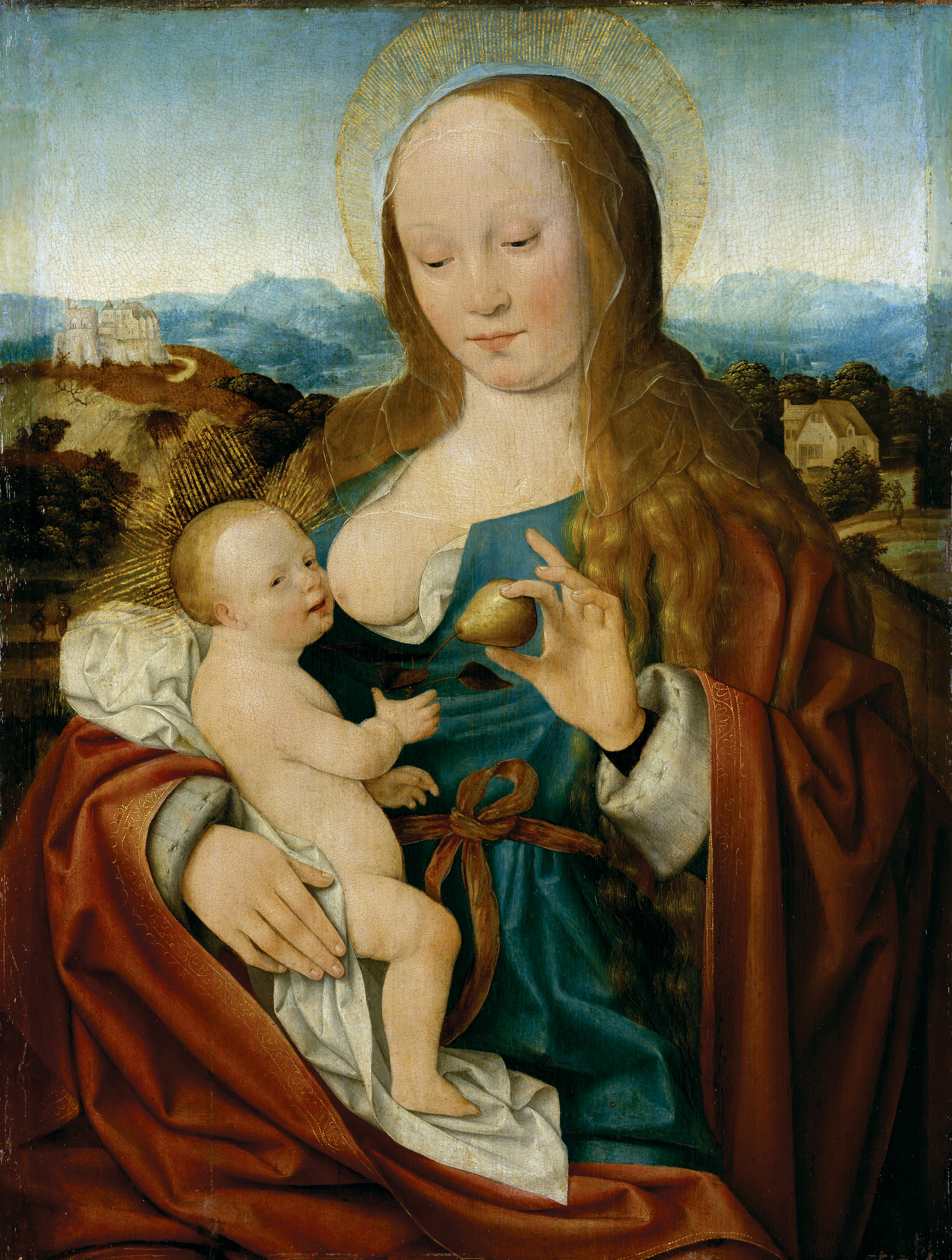
Madonna with Pear. Joos van Cleve, c. 1515.

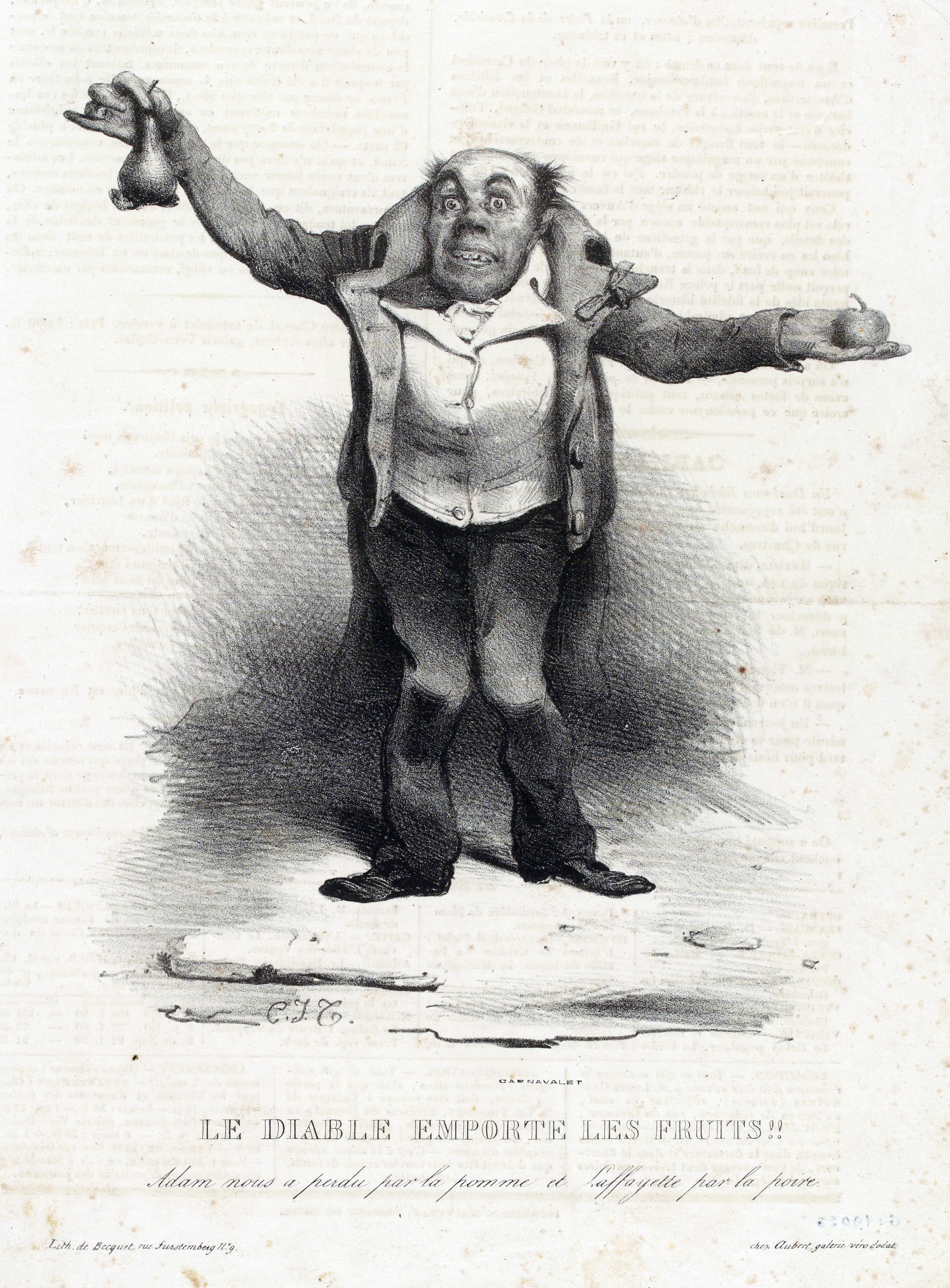
The Devil takes the fruit!! Traviès, 1833.

In the Virgin with a Pear by Albrecht Dürer or in the contemporary one by Joos van Cleve, the Madonna, as the "new Eve", shows the baby Jesus a pear instead of an apple, as an explanation of her role and her greatness. Mayeux alludes ironically to this interpretation by proclaiming, with regard to the support provided in July 1830 by La Fayette to Louis-Philippe: "Adam lost us with the apple and La Fayette with the pear".

Fabrice Erre concludes that these earlier iconographic meanings likely did not influence Philipon's choice, further supporting the idea that the pear was not considered a symbol of pornography or sexual innuendo in early 19th-century France.

Politically, the metaphor of the "ripe pear" had been in use in France since the late 18th century. Jacques-René Hébert used it in Le Père Duchesne in 1792, suggesting that "the pear is ripe, it must fall." Napoleon also adopted the phrase, and it became a personal maxim for him, later reformulated by Hippolyte Taine as: "Wait for the pear to ripen, but do not allow anyone else to pick it." Saint-Simon, on his deathbed, also used the phrase, saying: "The pear is ripe; you must pick it."

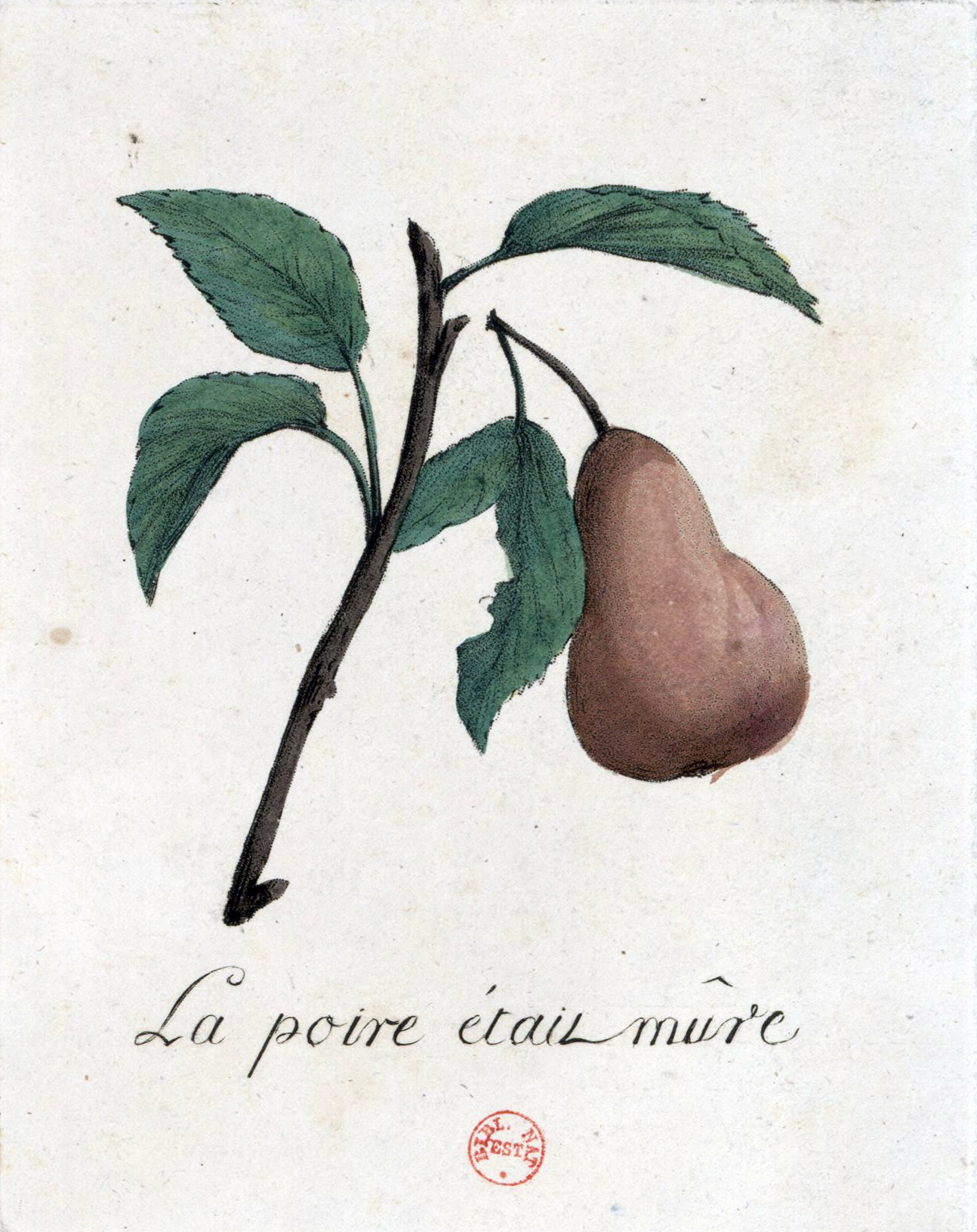
The pear was ripe. Anonymous, c. 1815.

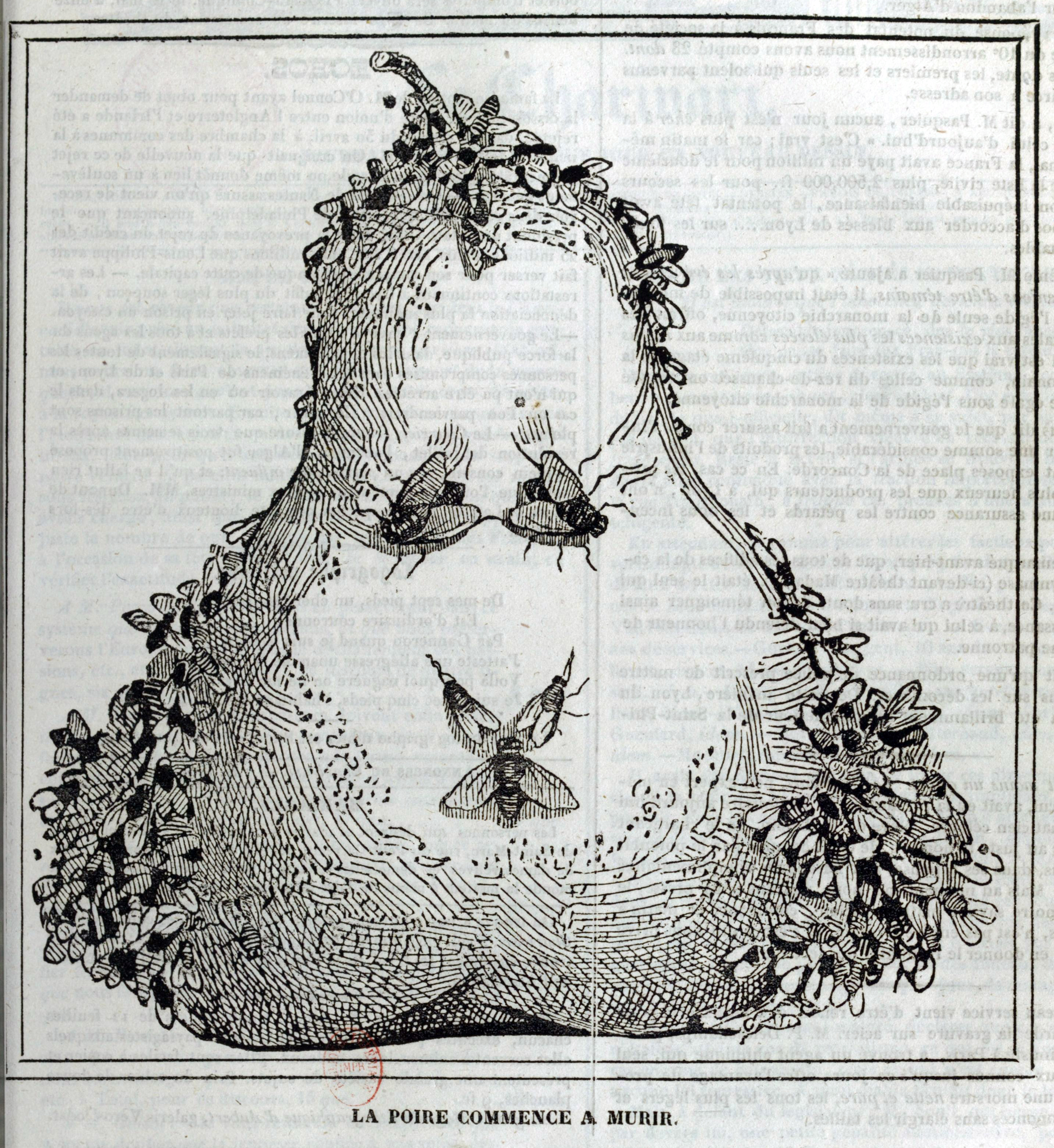
La Poire commence à mûrir. Anonyme, 1834.

The proverb, turned against the emperor in a caricature from 1815 in which his profile is cut out of a leaf, is reused in a caricature published in 1834 by Le Charivari in which the forelock, the sideburns, the eyes and the mouth are represented by insects.

=== Philipon before the pear ===
Charles Philipon was born in Lyon in 1800, the son of a wallpaper merchant. At the age of 23, he moved to Paris to pursue an artistic career. To support himself, he initially worked for image makers on Rue Saint-Jacques and for manufacturers of labels and rebuses, illustrating numerous affordable story sheets. From 1824 onward, he began studying lithography while specializing in producing individual works, which were sold as separate sheets. His early works were focused on popular subjects, including fashion series, caricatures of manners, and comic advertisements, although they did not stand out as exceptional.

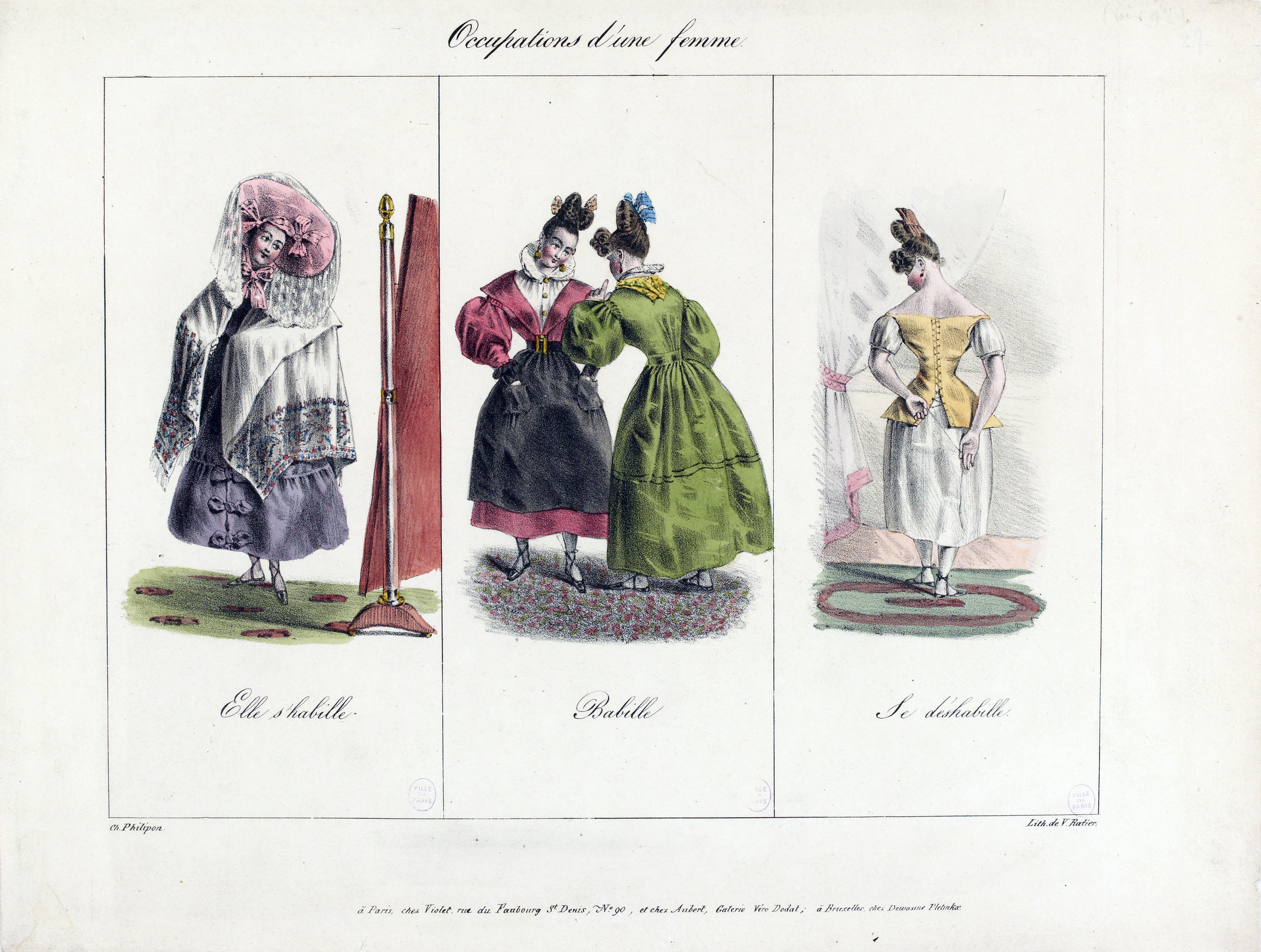
Occupations of a woman. Philipon, c. 1830.

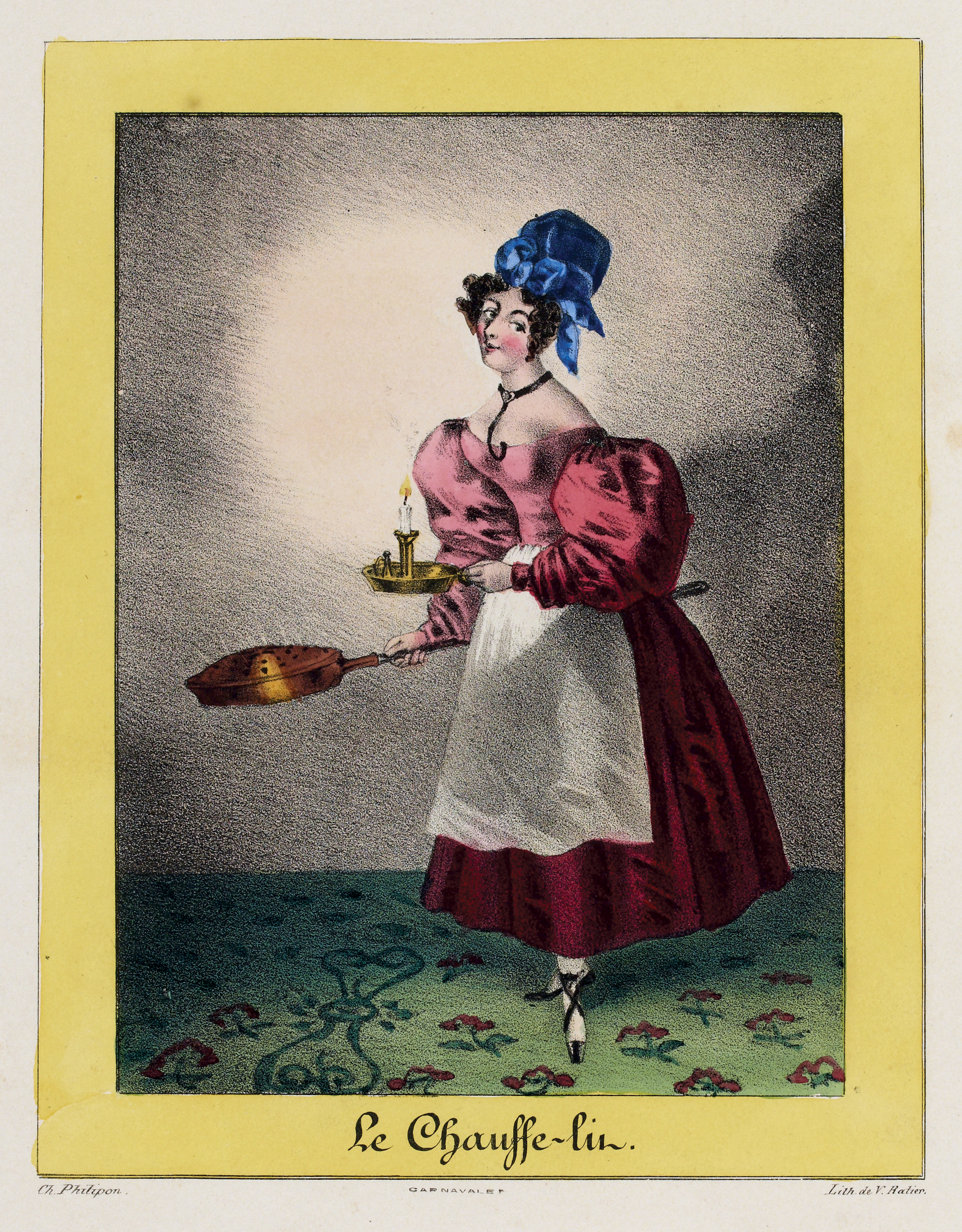
Le Chauffe-lit. Philipon, 1830.

Occupations d'une femme, with its naive and stereotypical voyeurism, and Le Chauffe-lit, whose caption seems, according to Cuno, to apply to the female character, are examples of Philipon's lithographs from before his political involvement, characterized by a conventional style, frequently bawdy, without political connotation but in line with the tastes of his clientele.

In October 1829, Philipon contributed to the creation of La Silhouette, the first French periodical to exploit the new possibilities of lithography by regularly publishing illustrated content. His role in the venture has been described by James Cuno as "central", while David Kerr considered it "difficult to determine" and possibly limited to organizing the lithographic section. Two months later, in December 1829, after his brother-in-law Gabriel Aubert faced financial difficulties, Philipon partnered with him to establish Maison Aubert, a "caricature shop" that aimed to supply prints created by Philipon and his professional network.

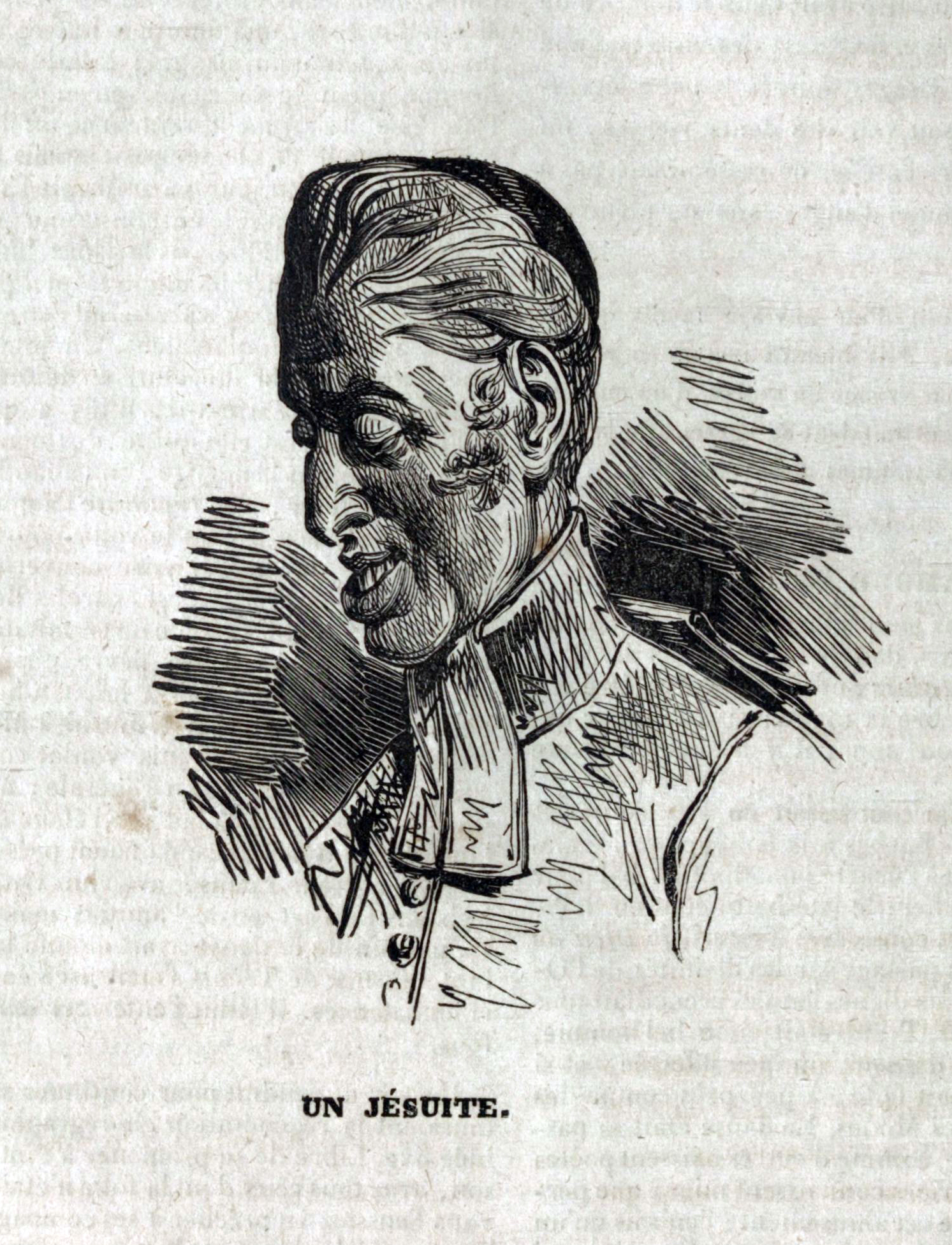
A Jesuit. Philipon, April 1830. (Note: The vignette was republished as a lithographic plate in August 1830, with the subtitle "Portrait Declared Resembling Charles X by Judgment of the Police Court," and then in the last issue of La Silhouette in January 1831.)

In April 1830, La Silhouette published Un jésuite, a vignette by Philipon depicting Charles X. The caricature represented the liberals' opposition to the ultra-royalists, with Jesuitism serving as a symbol of their political stance. The illustration was discreetly placed within the publication to avoid censorship. Following the release, the issue was seized, and at the trial, the prosecutor argued that the image unmistakably depicted the King. The deputy director of the publication, Benjamin-Louis Bellet, fined and sentenced to six months in prison, while Philipon, who had not signed the caricature, avoided punishment. Despite this, the incident helped establish Philipon's reputation as a political caricaturist. (Note: Philipon's Ayez pitié d'un pauvre aveugle, the first political lithograph sold by Maison Aubert in August 1830, sold several thousand copies and underwent four printings.)

In July 1830, following the Trois Glorieuses, Louis-Philippe ascended to the throne, marking the beginning of the July Monarchy. This new regime pledged to uphold the Constitutional Charter of August 14, 1830, which included provisions for freedom of the press. In August 1830, amid political shifts, Philipon created a series of caricatures of Charles X. James Cuno observed that these caricatures demonstrated a noticeable shift in Philipon's style, with a more developed sense of composition and execution. Cuno characterized Philipon as an entrepreneurial artist, adept at leveraging the growing lithographic market.

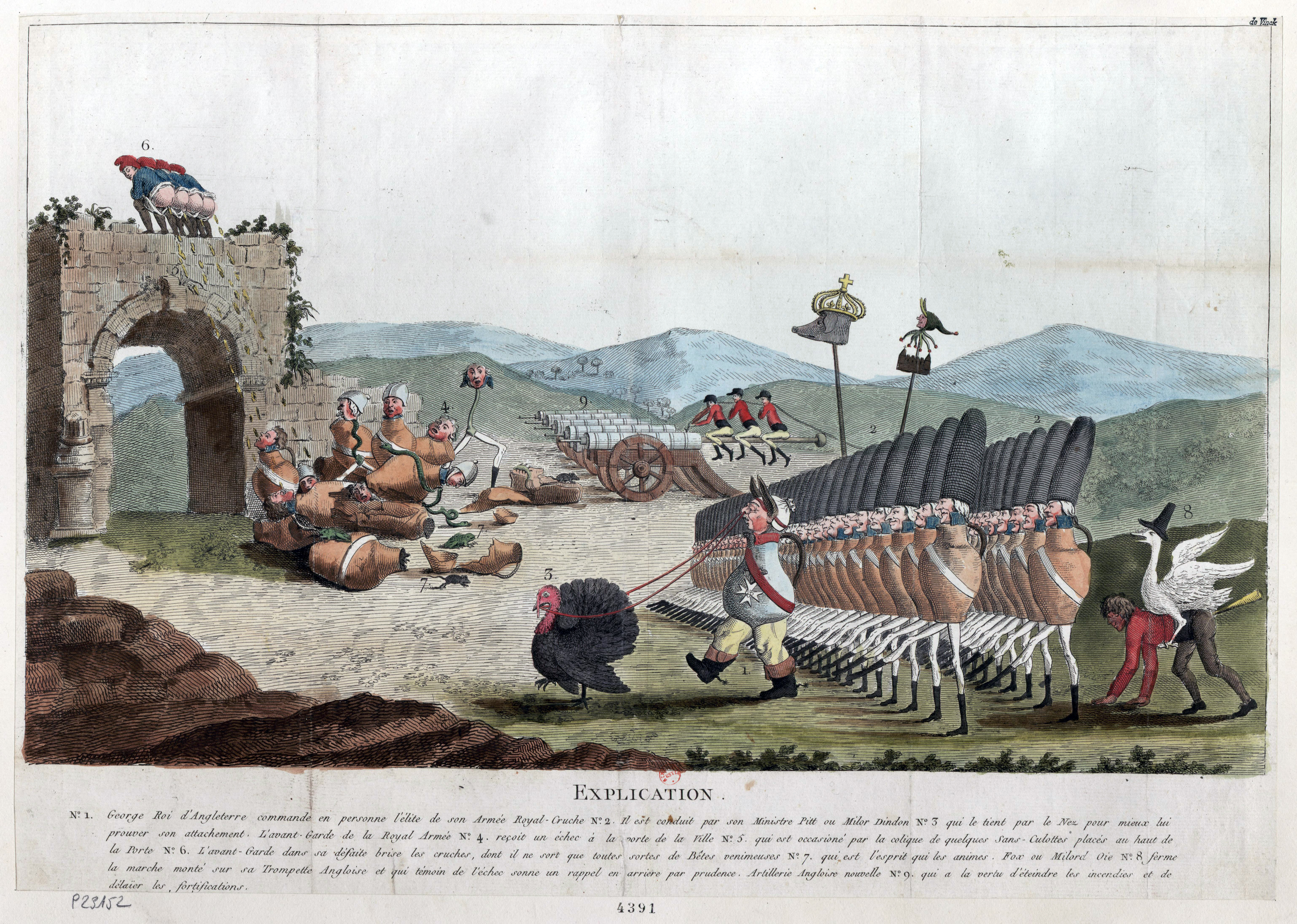
Army of the King and the Republic. Jacques-Louis David, 1794.

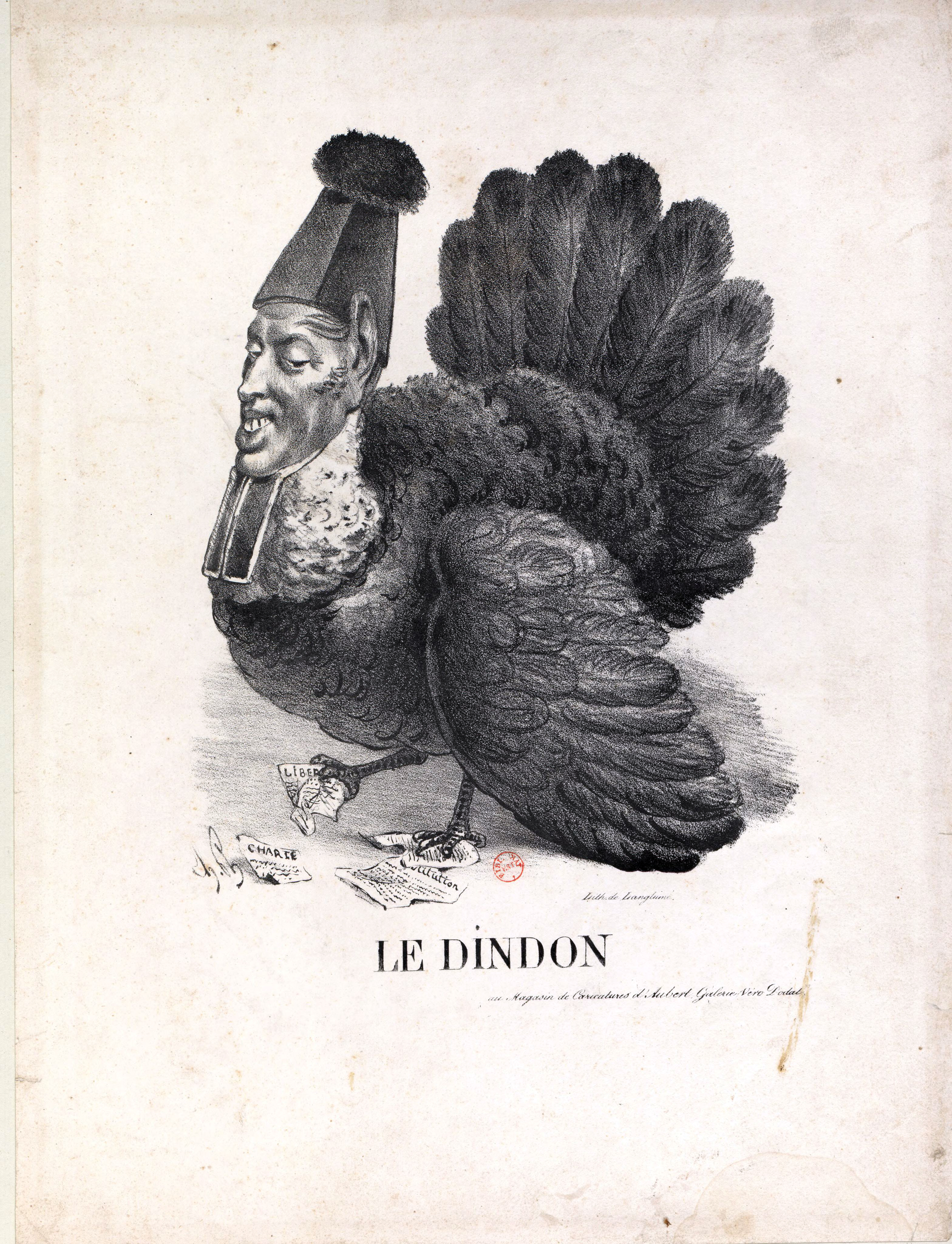
Le Dindon. Philipon, August 1830.

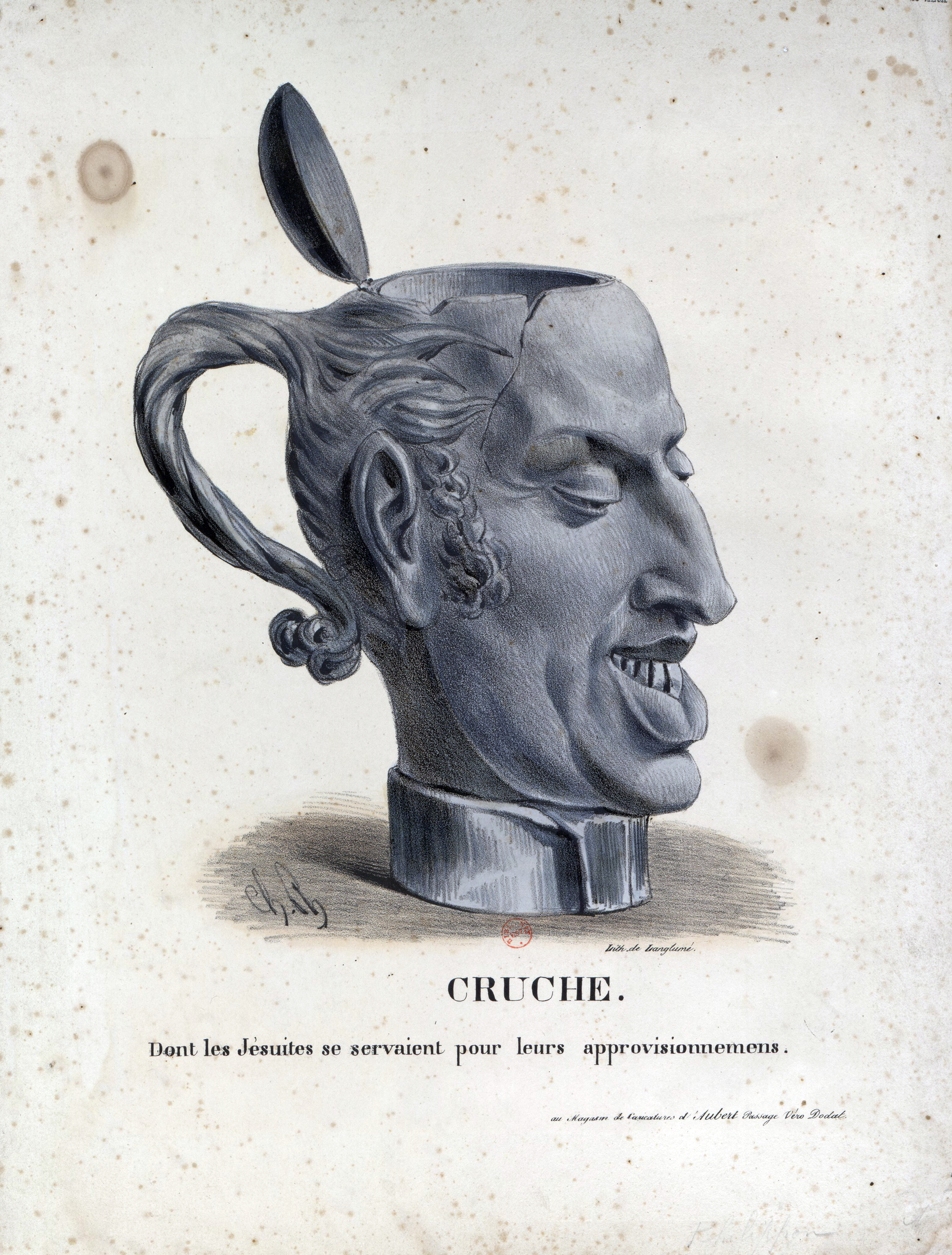
The Jug. Philipon, August 1830.

To represent the foolishness of the deposed king, Philipon plays on the same double meanings of the words “turkey” and “jug” as Jacques-Louis David when he caricatured in 1794 King George III, led into war against France by William Pitt.

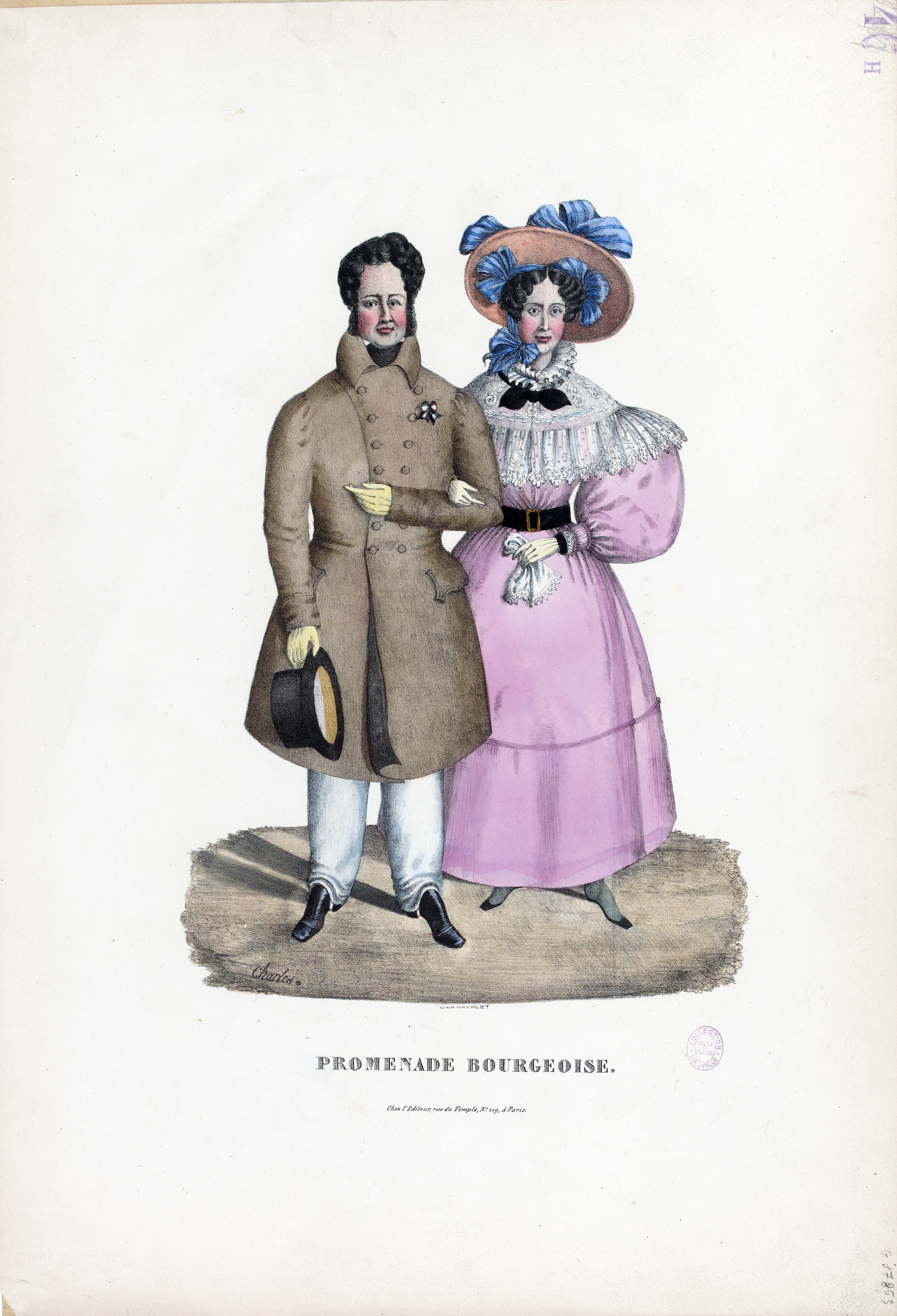
Promenade bourgeoise. Philipon, November 1830.

In November 1830, Charles Philipon launched his satirical weekly La Caricature, bringing with him the expertise in artists, printers, and distributors that he had acquired at La Silhouette, along with a portion of its readership, as that publication ceased in January 1831. Gabriel Weisberg notes that Philipon's early depictions of Louis-Philippe, such as Promenade Bourgeoise in November 1830, were not overtly critical but focused on the king-citizen's portrayal of bourgeois values.

In February 1831, Philipon published an untitled lithograph depicting Louis-Philippe blowing bubbles from a soap called Mousse de Juillet, which featured slogans such as "freedom of the press" and "the Charter will be a reality." The print was not included in La Caricature but was released separately, possibly to avoid the consequences of its publication. Ségolène Le Men and Nathalie Preiss note that this caricature foreshadowed the development of the Poire figure, symbolizing "swelling" and "hollow inflation." The authorities seized the print at the publisher's premises and confiscated the lithographic stone from the printer. This marked the first caricature to face such treatment under the July Monarchy, despite its constitutional commitment to press freedom. Philipon was charged with insulting the king. His lawyer argued that the caricature did not depict the king himself but instead "personified power," with Philipon maintaining "respect and veneration" for the royal figure. This incident led Philipon to direct La Caricature in a more political direction.

On June 30, 1831, La Caricature published an anonymous caricature depicting Louis-Philippe as a mason plastering a wall to erase the traces of the Trois Glorieuses. As the publication's director, Philipon was again prosecuted for offending the king.

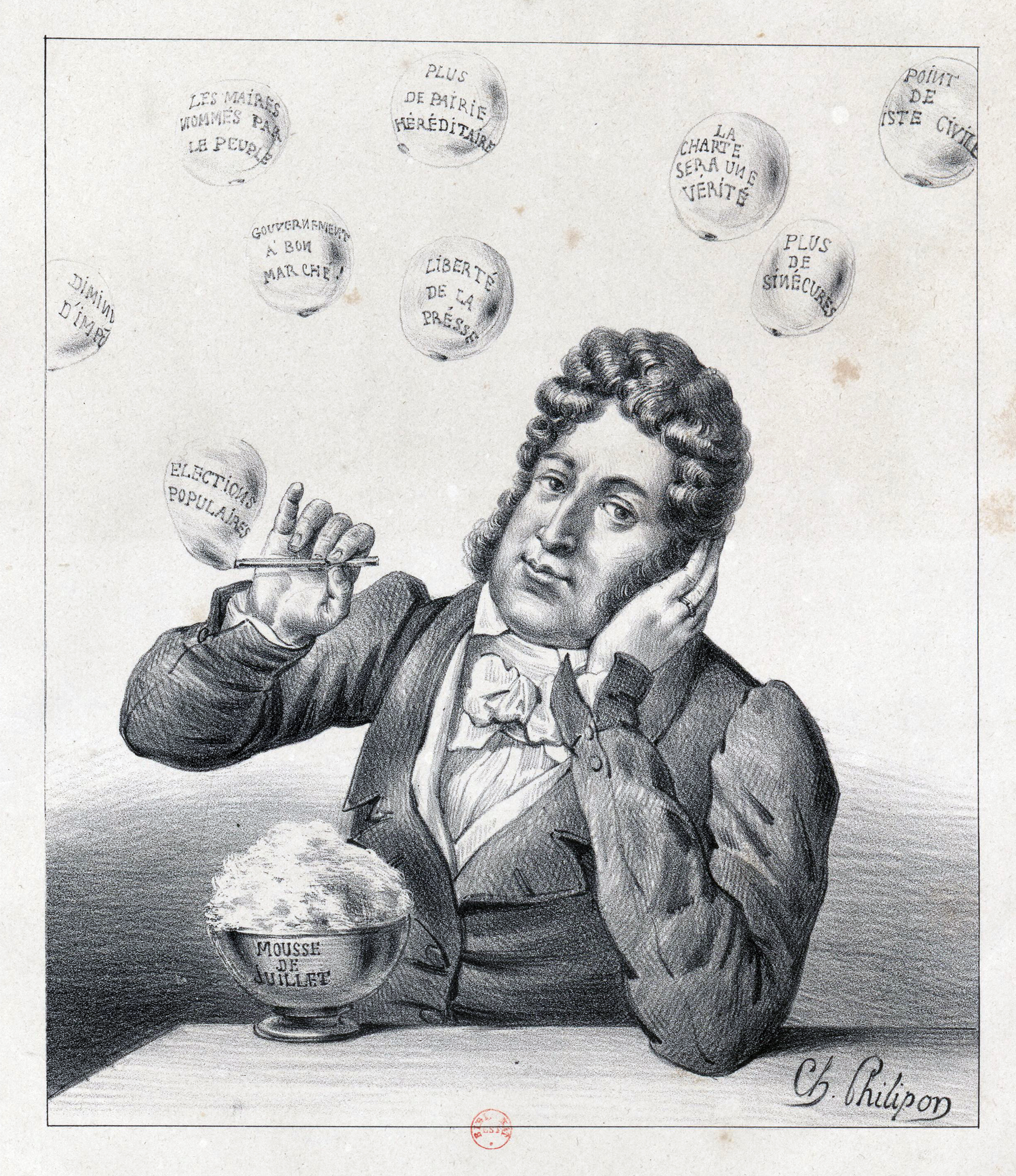
Les Bulles de savon. Philipon, February 1831.

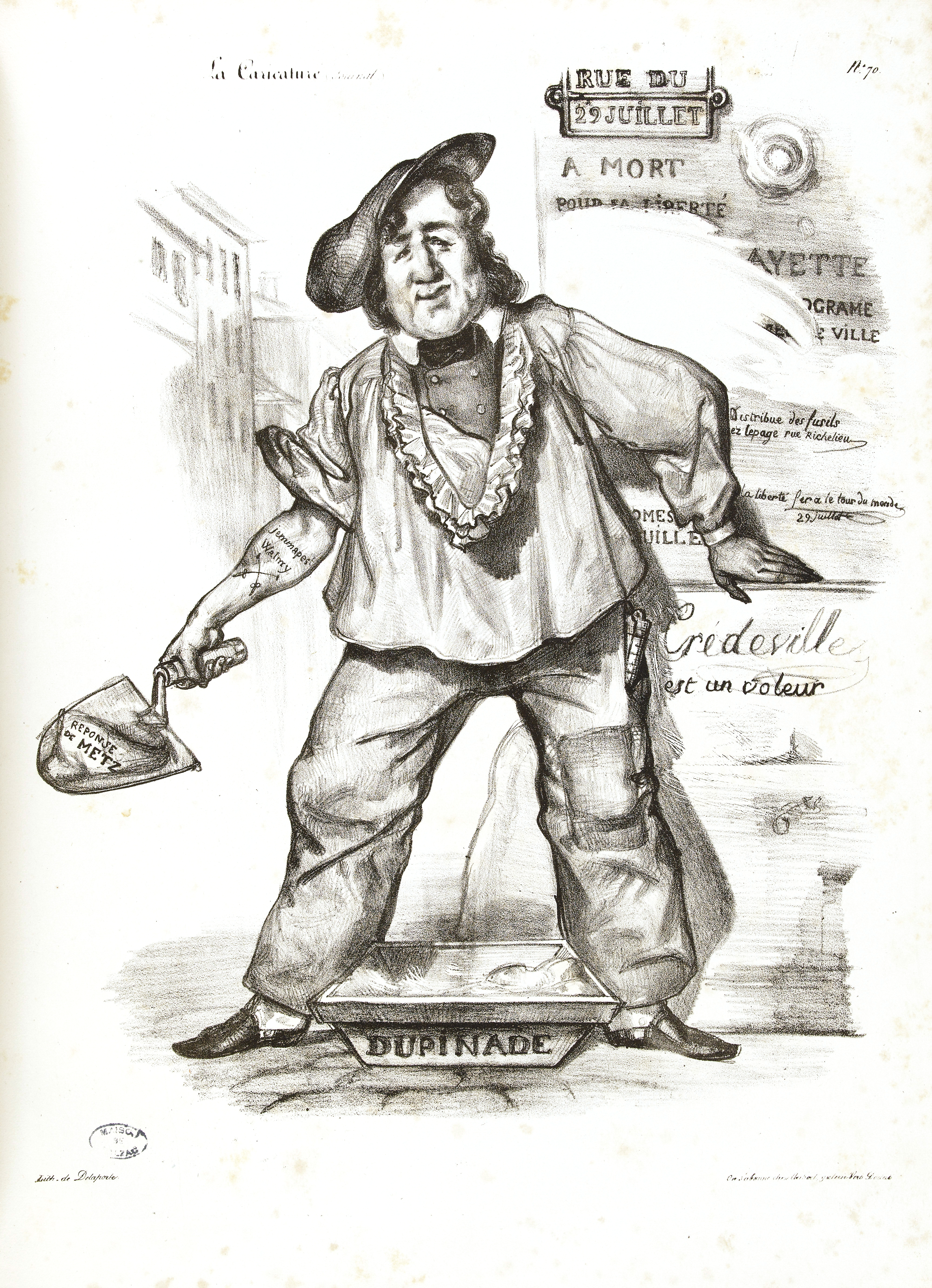
Le Replâtrage, June 1831

In his first correspondence from Paris for the Gazette d'Augsbourg, in December 1831, Heinrich Heine expressed the “horror” inspired by the expression of peaceful unconcern on the king's face in these caricatures, which contrasts with the fraudulent (schwindelnde) political position of the citizen-king, but assumes that his nature (Gemüt) is not as carefree as his face.

=== Creation of the Pear ===
==== Argumentative origins ====
At the Replâtrage trial before the Assize Court on November 14, 1831, Charles Philipon's lawyer argued that the exercise of press freedom, as guaranteed by the 1830 Charter, required the ability to depict political power through caricature. He contended that this required the right to "take the likeness, not the person, of the one who embodies it." Philipon supported this argument, suggesting that any caricature could be seen to resemble the king's face, regardless of the depiction's style. He argued that this would lead to accusations of lèse-majesté for any caricature. He further contended that the caricature did not target the king himself—who was neither named, titled, nor identified by symbols—but rather "power, represented by a sign, by a likeness that could belong just as much to a mason as to the king, but was not the king." This argument, rooted in praeteritio, has been analyzed by several scholars through Ernst Kantorowicz's theory of the king's dual body — physical and symbolic. To support his argument, Philipon sketched four drawings in which Louis-Philippe's head gradually transformed into a pear:

This sketch resembles Louis-Philippe. Will you therefore condemn it? Then you must condemn this one, which resembles the first. Then condemn this one, which resembles the second... And finally, if you are consistent, you cannot acquit this pear that resembles the previous sketches. Admit, gentlemen, that this is a strange form of press freedom!

In a letter from 1846, Philipon explained the intent behind this demonstration:

I was certain in advance that I would be condemned, not because our image was truly culpable, but because chance, aided by the legal jury selection, had composed an unforgiving jury... Anticipating certain condemnation, I sought revenge for this severity by popularizing through the trial proceedings... an image more vivid than the one for which I was about to be condemned. So I prepared my famous pear; I sketched and described it during the proceedings, and the day after my conviction, I published both the sketch and its explanation.

Philipon was sentenced to six months in prison and fined two thousand francs. Fenimore Cooper and William Makepeace Thackeray, recounting the trial for Anglo-Saxon readers, reported that Philipon had carved a pear for the jurors, with Cooper claiming that Philipon did so during the trial, and Thackeray reversing the sequence of events, imagining the pear turning into the king's face. Both writers attributed Philipon's inspired demonstration to an acquittal, which he did not receive. In France, Philibert Audebrand also reported a unanimous acquittal following the “hilarious” scene with the sketches.

In a supplement to the November 24, 1831, issue of La Caricature, where a subscription was launched to pay the fine, Philipon published his “croquades” (sketches) made during the trial. The lithographed plate, printed separately and sold under the title La Poire to help cover the fine imposed on Philipon, was displayed in the windows of Aubert's shop in the Passage Véro-Dodat, drawing crowds. In December 1831, the plate was seized, but Philipon protested, arguing that these sketches constituted a report of the trial proceedings. He secured the abandonment of the case, as announced in the December 22 issue of La Caricature. On January 26, 1832, the sketch plate was reissued with La Caricature to "facilitate understanding [of] the trial for those unfamiliar with it."

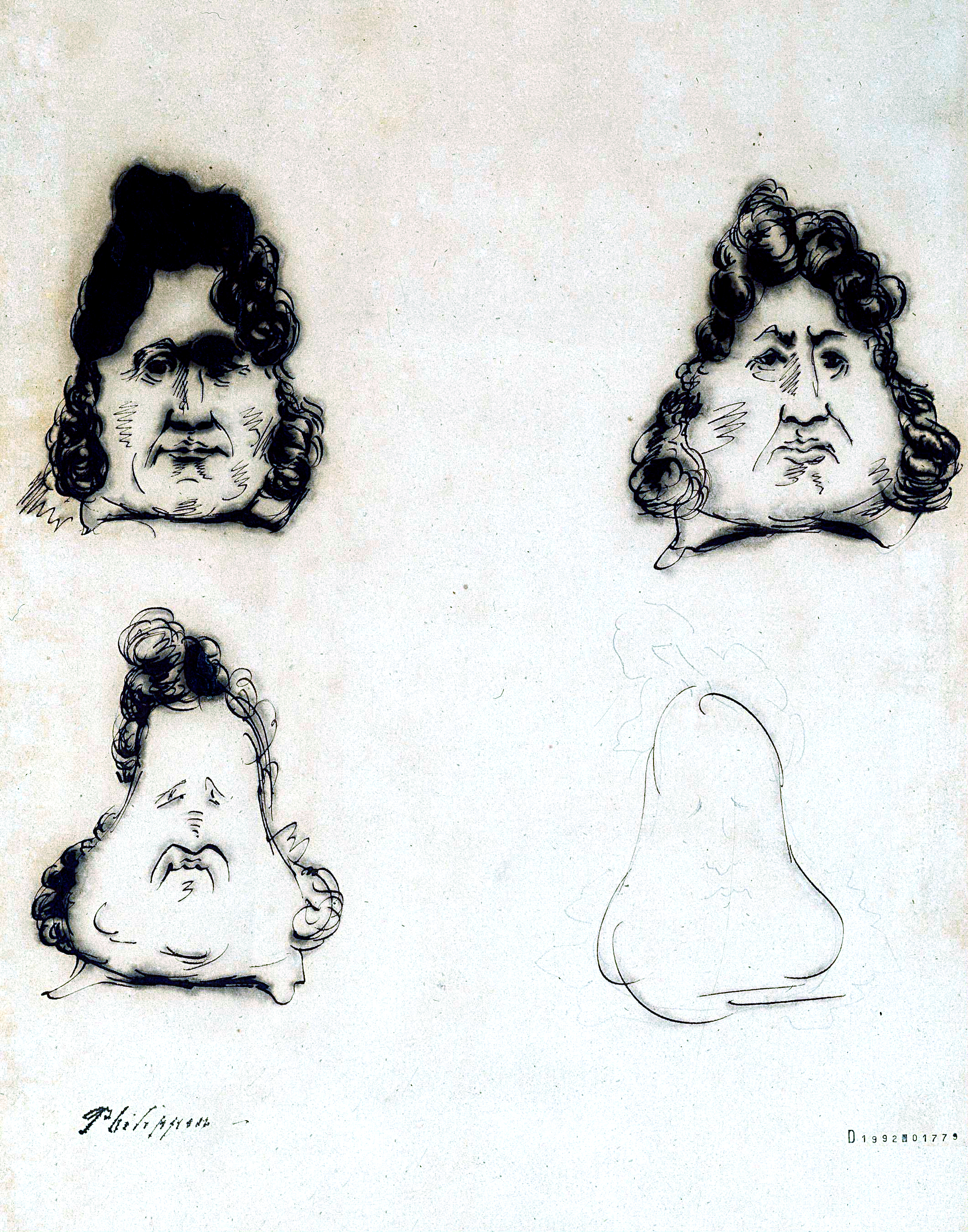
Manuscript given as original.

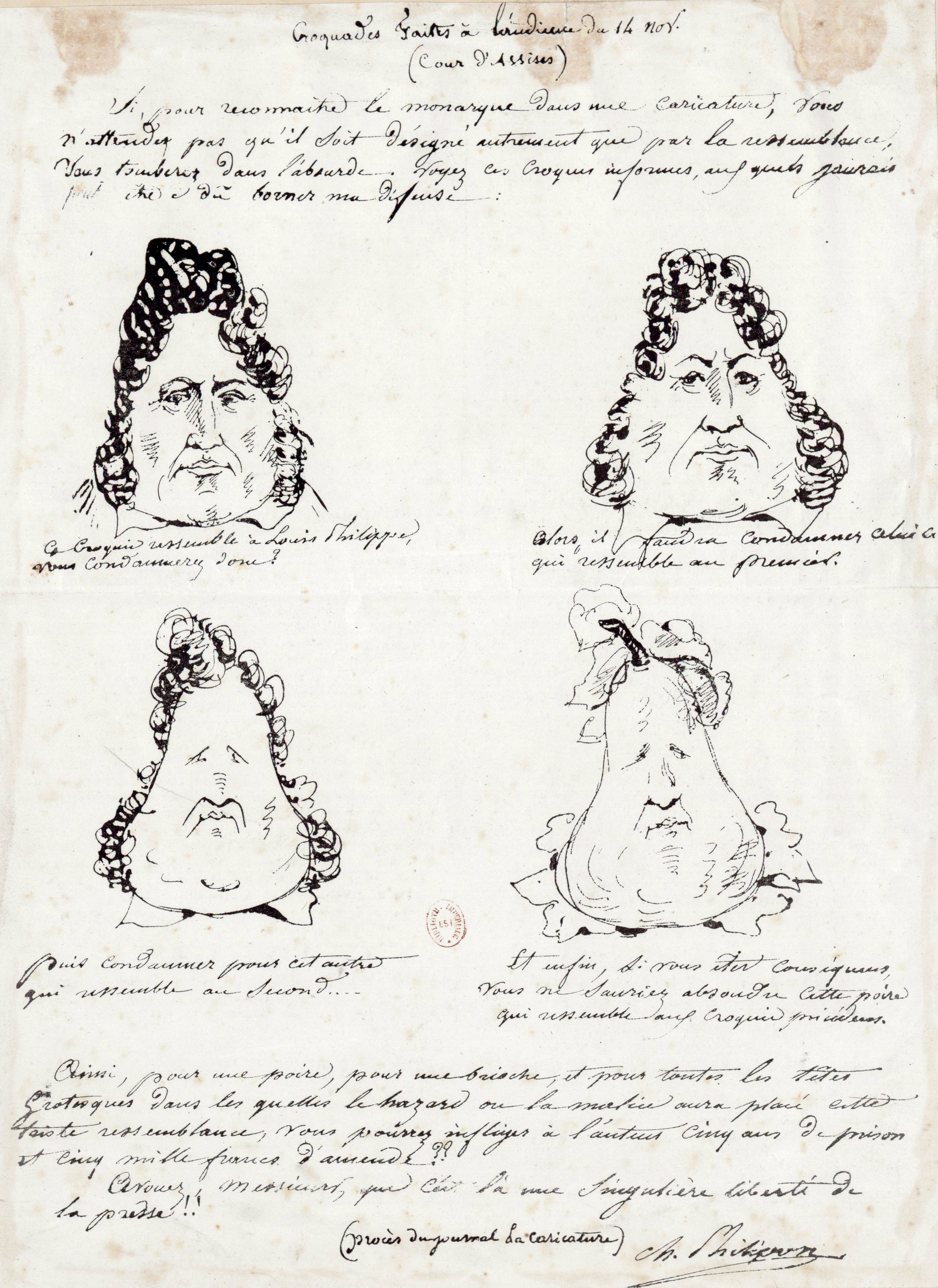
Croquades. Lithograph dated November 24, 1831.

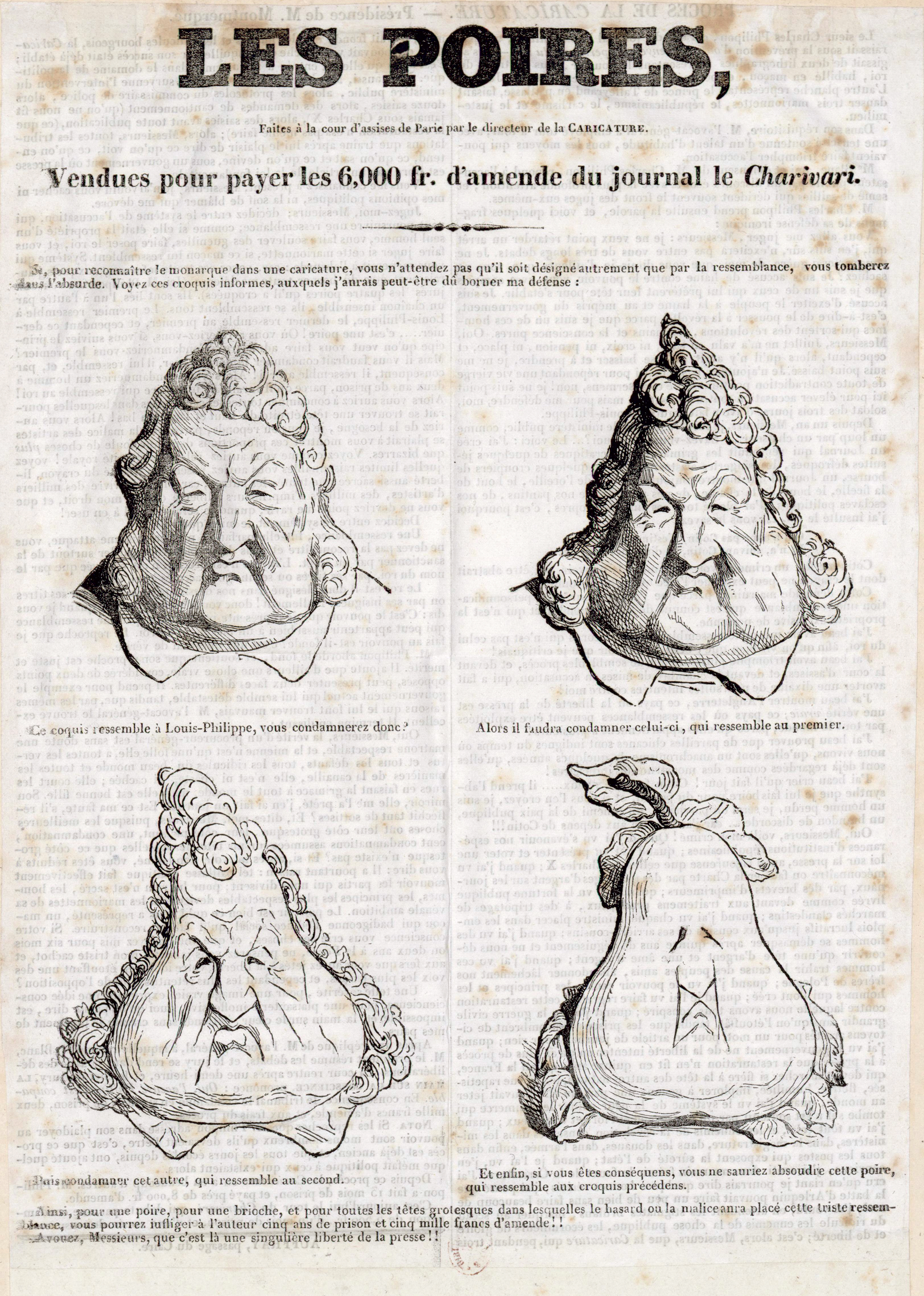
The Pears. Woodcut from January 17, 1834.

There are three versions of the series of four sketches: a sheet in pen and ink, without date or signature, given as the original of the sketches; a lithographic facsimile autographed by Philipon, published on November 24, 1831, as a separate supplement on the back of a catalog of Aubert's publications, and enclosed with the daily issue of La Caricature; an unsigned version engraved on wood, published in Le Charivari on January 17, 1834, and then on April 16, 1835, to raise funds to pay the newspaper's fines, also printed separately and sold for two sous.

The three portraits in the handwritten version of the caricature are more detailed than in the 1831 published version, with the pear outline appearing more cursive, enhancing the contrast. Additionally, the handwritten version bears no commentary, and the "Philipon" annotation is not in his handwriting. It remains unclear whether this sheet was created during the trial, is a copy, or serves as a preparatory sheet for facsimile reproduction. In the 1834 published version, the captions for the four images are typographically transcribed. Ségolène Le Men observes that this transcription softens the radical nature of the depiction by preserving the suggestion of facial features in the final image. She notes that this transformation reflects a shift in the images' purpose, which had become a trademark of the Maison Aubert: "The idea was no longer to draw the viewer in through the manuscript and sketch, but to present a provocative statement with a bold title, Les Poires, replacing the pun on the croquades."

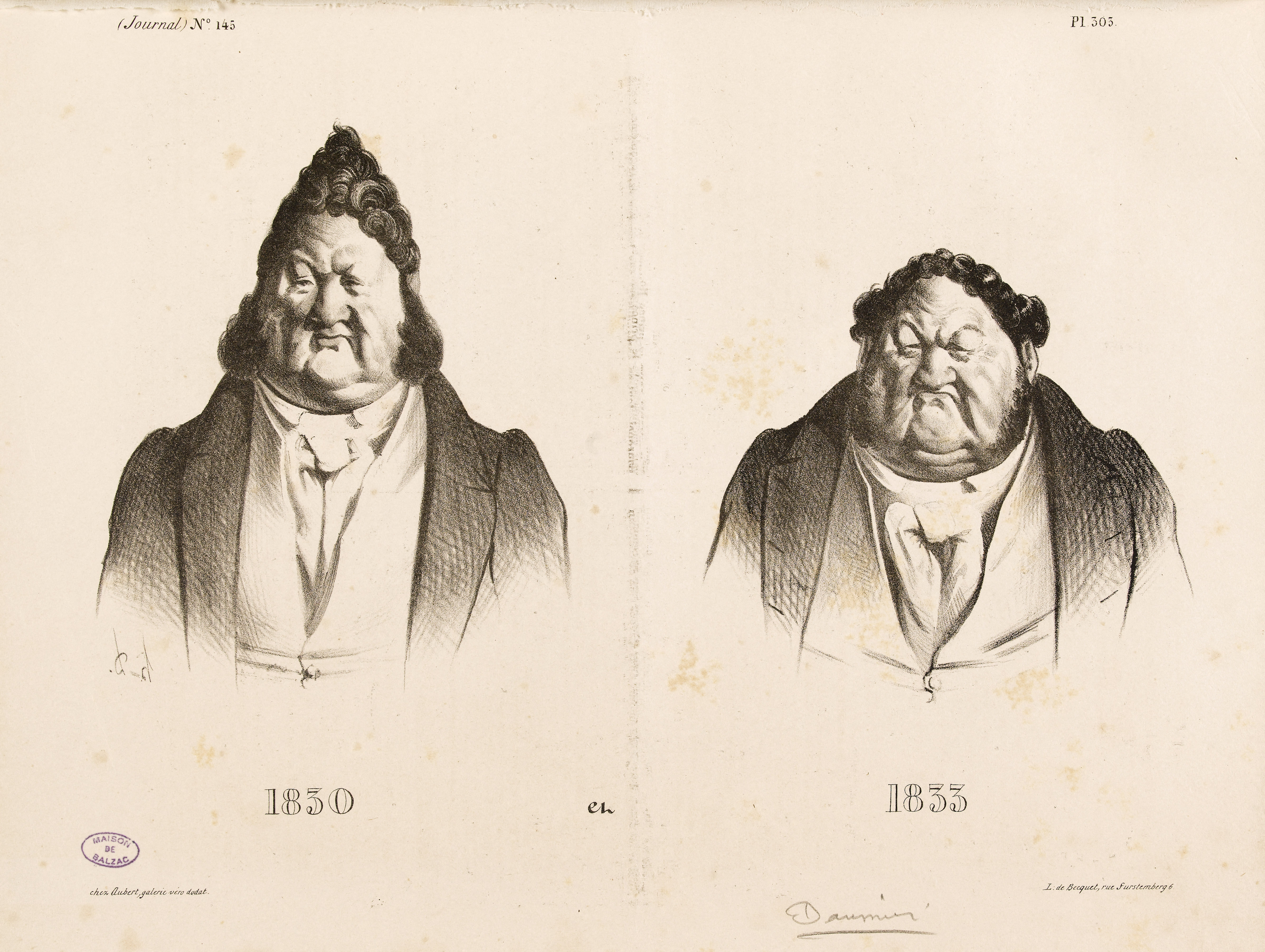
1830 and 1833. Honoré Daumier, 1833.

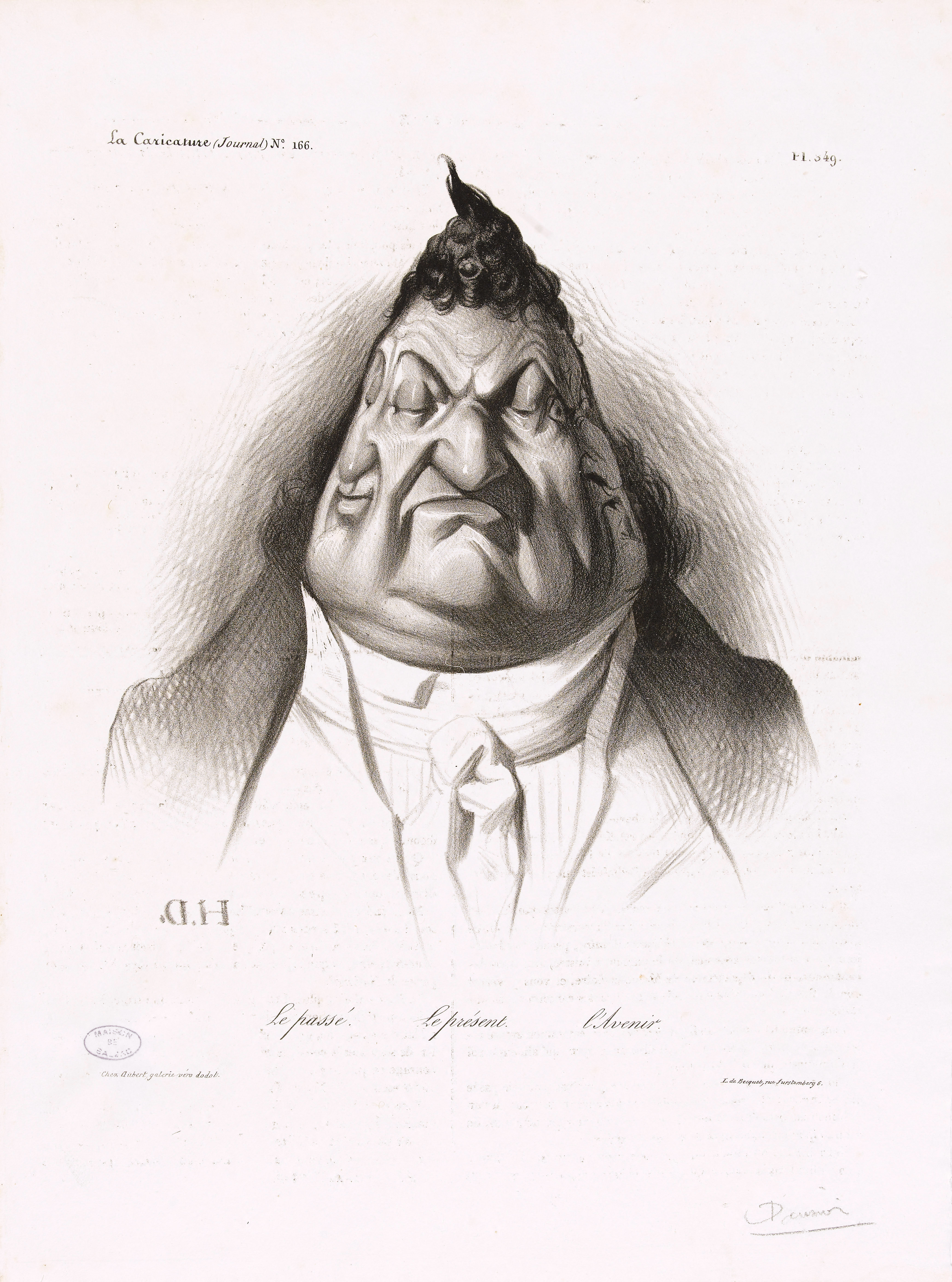
Past, present, future. Daumier, 1834.

“Les Poires”, the woodcut version from 1834, shows the hardening of the conflict between Philipon and the government, which is expressed in the king's features. Some authors assume that Daumier redrew the 1834 version, with Ségolène Le Men merely noting a similarity between the graphic treatment of Louis-Philippe in the latter version and the evolution of Daumier's representation of the king.

==== Collective work ====
As Philipon admitted in 1846, the series of sketches from November 1831 was not an improvised courtroom act. John Grand-Carteret suggests that Philipon had stumbled upon the idea of the pear by chance, "one day, it seems, while amusing himself by slicing up a fruit of this type." However, Champfleury, followed by Pierre Larousse, questioned:

Who first discovered that the figure of the citizen-king, with his thick sideburns and famous tuft, bore some resemblance to the shape of a pear? If it wasn’t Philipon, he was certainly the popularizer of the discovery.

According to Ségolène Le Men, it appears that the publisher had prepared a publicity campaign, allowing his illustrators to subtly introduce the motif into the plates as early as September. This would suggest that the pear was an "artistic group project", as Elizabeth Menon described the graphic development of the Mayeux character under Philipon's "entrepreneurial" leadership.

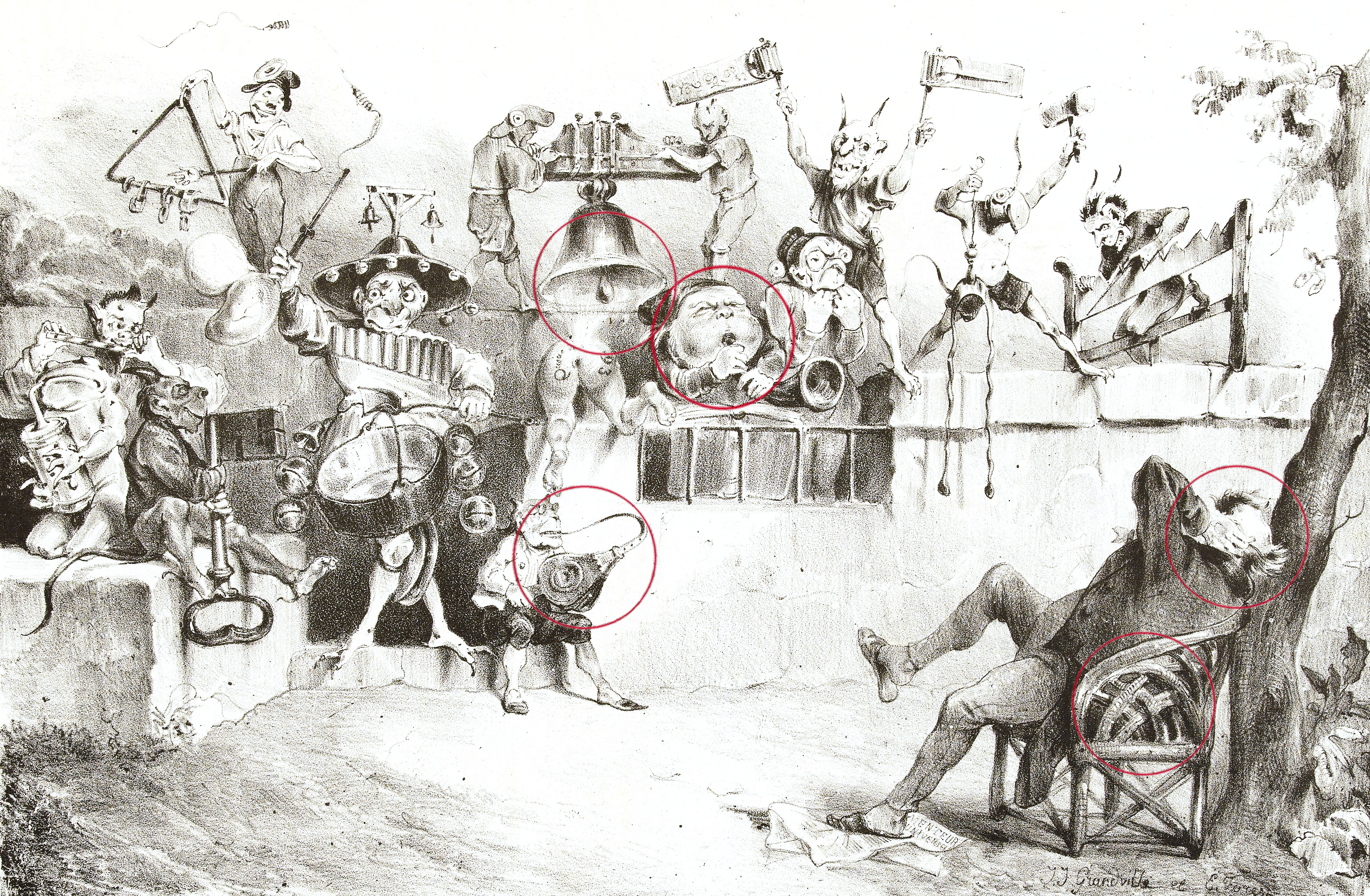
Uproar in the ears of Messrs. Guiz.., Dup., Thier., and tutti quanti. Grandville, 1831.

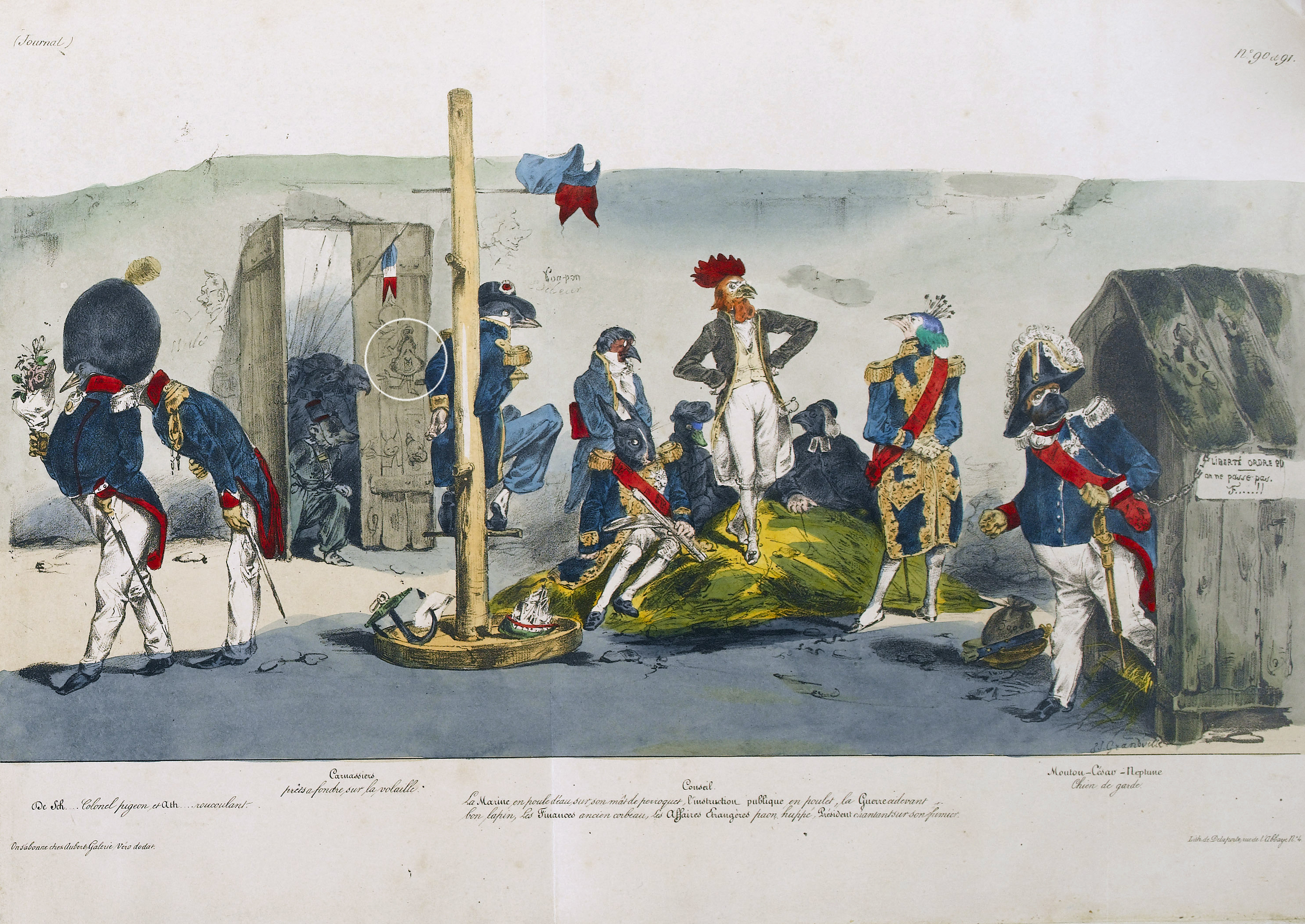
Basse Cour politique. Grandville, 1831.

On September 1st, 1831, in a lithograph perhaps inspired by Caprice 43 by Goya, Grandville shows the king, seated, covering his ears in front of the uproarious orchestra: “the pear shape is clearly visible in his face, hidden in the arm of the rattan chair, [...] in the large bell operated by two imps [...], in the chubby-cheeked face of a whistling gnome and in the bellows operated by another imp.” In Basse Cour politique, published on September 1st, 1831, the sign of the Pear appears as graffiti on a door and again on a wall on September 29, 1831, in another lithograph, Vois-tu, Chapolard, quand y disent citoyens by Louis-Henri de Rudder.

While the later development of the pear became a symbol and manifestation of the "Philipon vs. Philippe" conflict, as Paul Ginisty's often-repeated formula suggests, it was ultimately a collective creation. James Cuno believed that Philipon developed certain graphic ideas, which he then passed on to the artists he employed. According to Jules Brisson and Félix Ribeyre, "Philipon was the soul of the enterprise. He provided almost all the drawing themes, all the subjects for caricatures or political satire." David Kerr further explained that the exchange of ideas was common among collaborators at La Caricature, part of what Philipon referred to as "an emulation [...] that sparks public favor." Kerr also noted that the pear motif was "the best-known emblem borrowed among Philipon's newspaper collaborators or borrowed from one another", with artists from both La Caricature and Le Charivari being "keenly aware that they were part of a shared enterprise: they worked as a team, constantly borrowing themes and motifs."

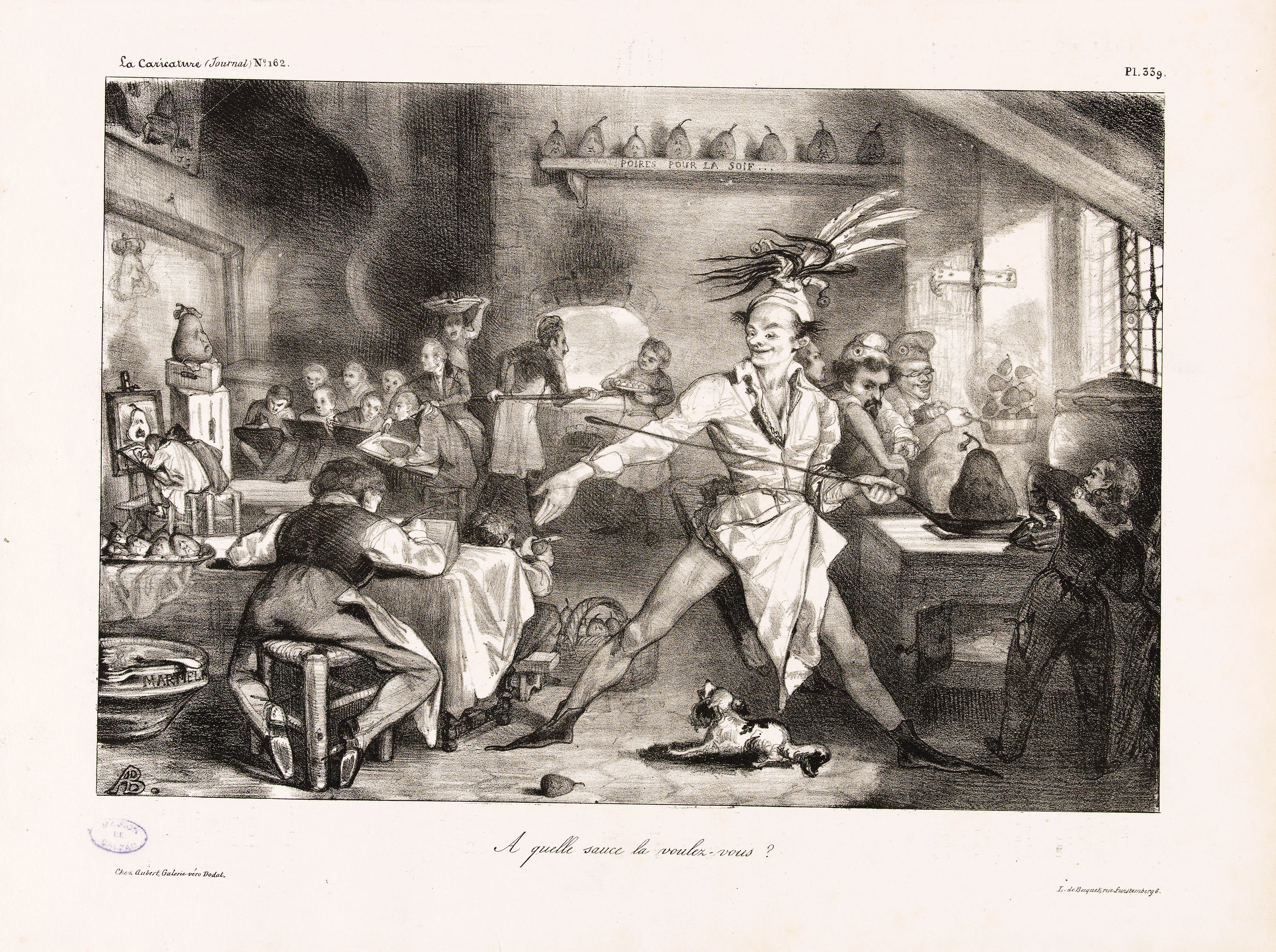
How do you like it? Auguste Bouquet, 1833.

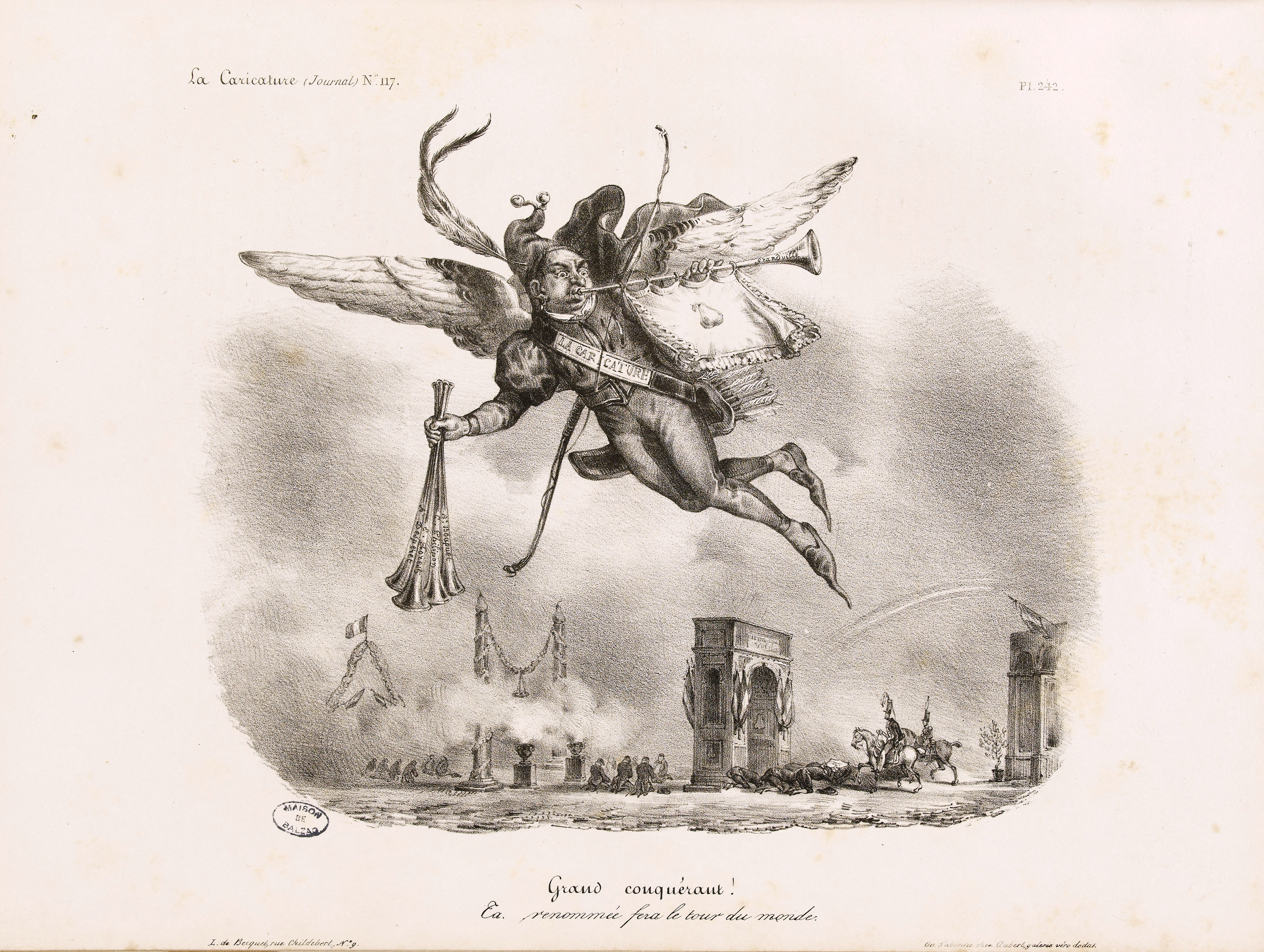
Great Conqueror. Auguste Desperet, 1833.

How do you like it? The great head chef, Philipon, is shown preparing the Poire in the kitchen of La Caricature with the help of his “joyous colleagues, the cartoonists, Grandville, Forest, Traviès, Daumier, Benjamin, the child Jean-Paul and Bouquet, the author of this drawing,” while behind them a new generation of artists is learning the “art of pear-shaped composition” by drawing pears with human heads. In Great Conqueror by Auguste Desperet, the madman personifying La Caricature, originally drawn by Grandville, is assimilated to the allegory of fame. He holds four trumpets in his hand with the names Bouquet, Philipon, Forest and Desperet, while blowing into a fifth trumpet with the name Grandville, to which is attached a banner representing the Pear.

== Meanings of the pear ==
As Gabriel Weisberg noted, interpreting lithographs produced during the July Monarchy can be challenging today due to the artists' use of multiple layers of meaning intended for different audiences, as well as their references to fleeting events while also aiming for a certain universality. The pear became a multifaceted symbol. On one hand, as an emblem of the king, it represented both his face and body, with various connotations, including scatological and sexual meanings. On the other hand, it expressed the "graphic convergence of the three elements constituting the July Monarchy": its sovereign, its social base—the bourgeoisie—and its ideology of moderation. Finally, it was associated with political humor.

=== An arbitrary sign ===
In an essay on caricature, Charles Baudelaire commented on the success of what he called the "pyramidal and Olympian Pear of lasting memory." He believed that "the symbol [of the pear] had been found through a complacent analogy. The symbol was then sufficient. With this plastic slang, one could say and convey anything to the people."

Several authors have analyzed this observation, particularly noting that Baudelaire's notion of "plastic slang" encompasses a process of "condensation to the point of erasure, exaggeration to deformity, and displacement to inversion", which Baudelaire used as a model to theorize poetic creation. In this context, even if the resemblance between Louis-Philippe's face and a pear was not immediately apparent, the pear and the king became visual equivalents.

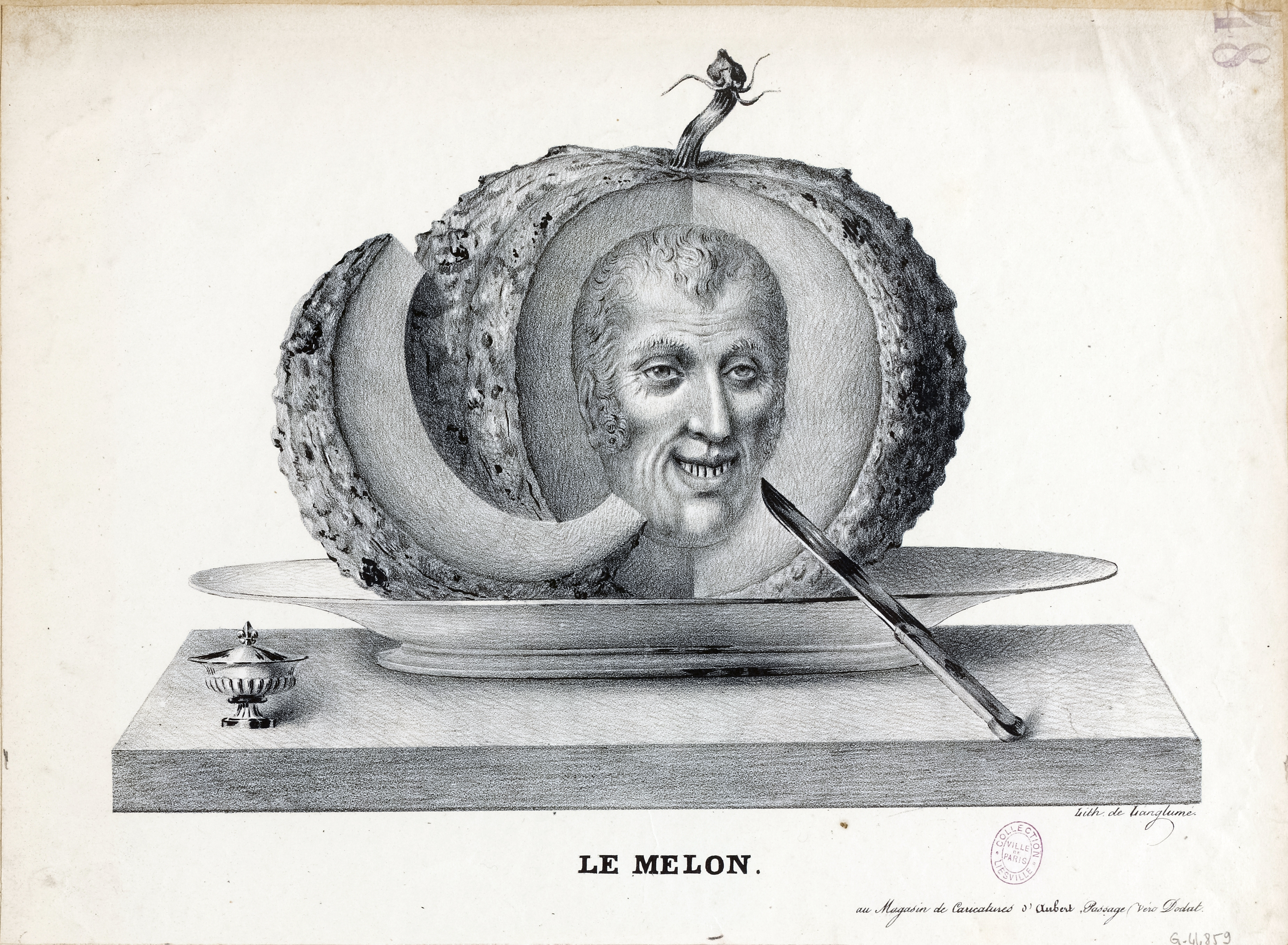
Le Melon, Pierre Langlumé, 1830.

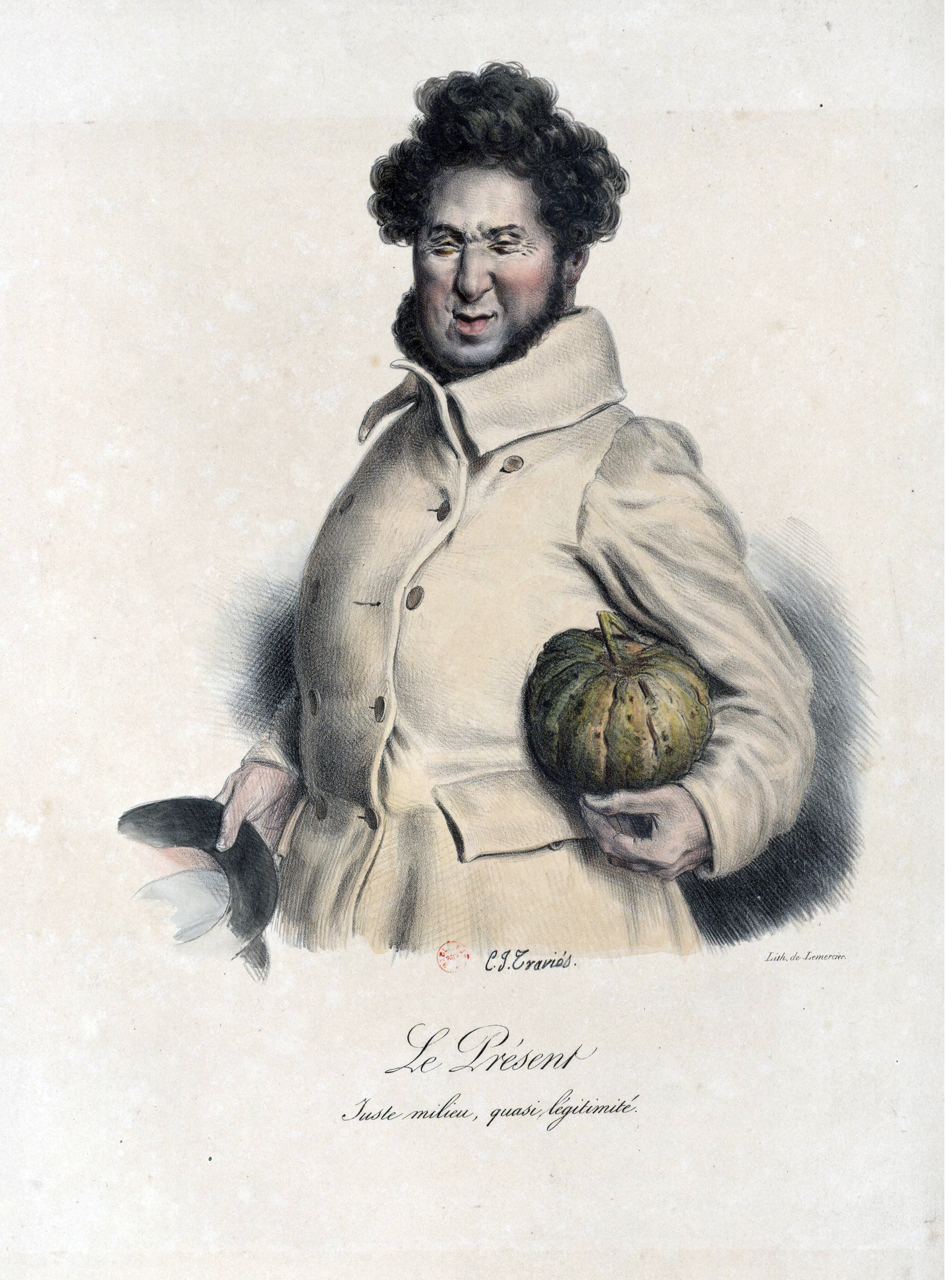
The Present: a happy medium, quasi-legitimacy. Traviès, 1831.

The melon representing Charles X or the pumpkin, Louis-Philippe (even if carefully detached from the head) are not resemblances but equivalences, intended to suggest stupidity. As Ernst Gombrich explains, the viewer, while remaining aware of the difference between the particular characteristics of the person represented and his plant equivalent, is struck by a similarity of the whole; he perceives “not similarities, but equivalences that allow him to see reality as if it were an image, and an image as reality.” The process involved is similar to that analyzed for slang by several linguists for whom there is a kind of “metaphorical matrix” at work in the development of slang terms, which equates the head with a round fruit.

Sandy Petrey considered Baudelaire's analysis as a recognition of the strictly symbolic nature of the pear. He disagreed with authors who believed that the choice of the pear was based on resemblance, such as Sergei Eisenstein, who argued that "the tuft of hair on the forehead and the king's sideburns, when combined, resembled the silhouette of a pear; thus this agreed-upon sign of mockery was born, discovered by Philipon." Petrey took Philipon's argument at face value, viewing the pear as an arbitrary sign that could have been replaced by "a brioche or any bizarre head in which chance or malice placed this unfortunate resemblance." (Note: Ségolène Le Men, while considering the argument of the arbitrary sign a "feint," notes that it fits within the context of Romantic reflections on the transformation of the analogical sign into an arbitrary sign.)

What Philipon said [to the judges] about his drawing is perfectly true: it's not the king, 'it's a pear.' The sequence of events was association → resemblance, not resemblance → association; the resemblance of Louis-Philippe to a pear was the result and not the cause of [Philipon's] identification.

Petrey further emphasized that the association between Louis-Philippe and the pear was both "unjustified and indissoluble, arbitrary and authoritative," and that it arose not "from the nature of the world but from a process of semiosis", highlighting three key characteristics:

- The origin of the semiotic link is precisely situated in time and constituted a sociopolitical and semantic act from the outset.
- This link emerged from the denial of its very existence. The pear and the king became indistinguishable by emphasizing their distinction.
- Despite its negative origin, this sign led to efforts to "negate the negation" and present the pear as possessing a physical reality, where the artificial was constantly presented as natural.

James Cuno offered a different perspective, challenging Petrey's analysis by asserting that the pear was not merely an arbitrary sign. Cuno argued that for the pear to have achieved such success, it must have meant more to Philipon's contemporaries, particularly to the king: "It necessarily had to be perceived by its target, the king, as something very personal, as an attack against him and not merely his function." Cuno noted that the pear's power stemmed from its simplicity, which allowed it to be easily reproduced, and from its capacity to generate a wide range of interpretations and meanings, often more critical and insulting.

=== The king's face ===
During the November 1831 trial, the equivalence between the king's face and a pear was at issue. Hippolyte Castille highlighted this aspect:

This peculiar comparison took on symbolic proportions, turning it into a true stroke of genius. The pointed end of the pear represented the forehead; Louis-Philippe always had an aversion to heroism and glory. The other end represented the jaw, that is, material appetites. With a single stroke of the pen, his reign was judged.

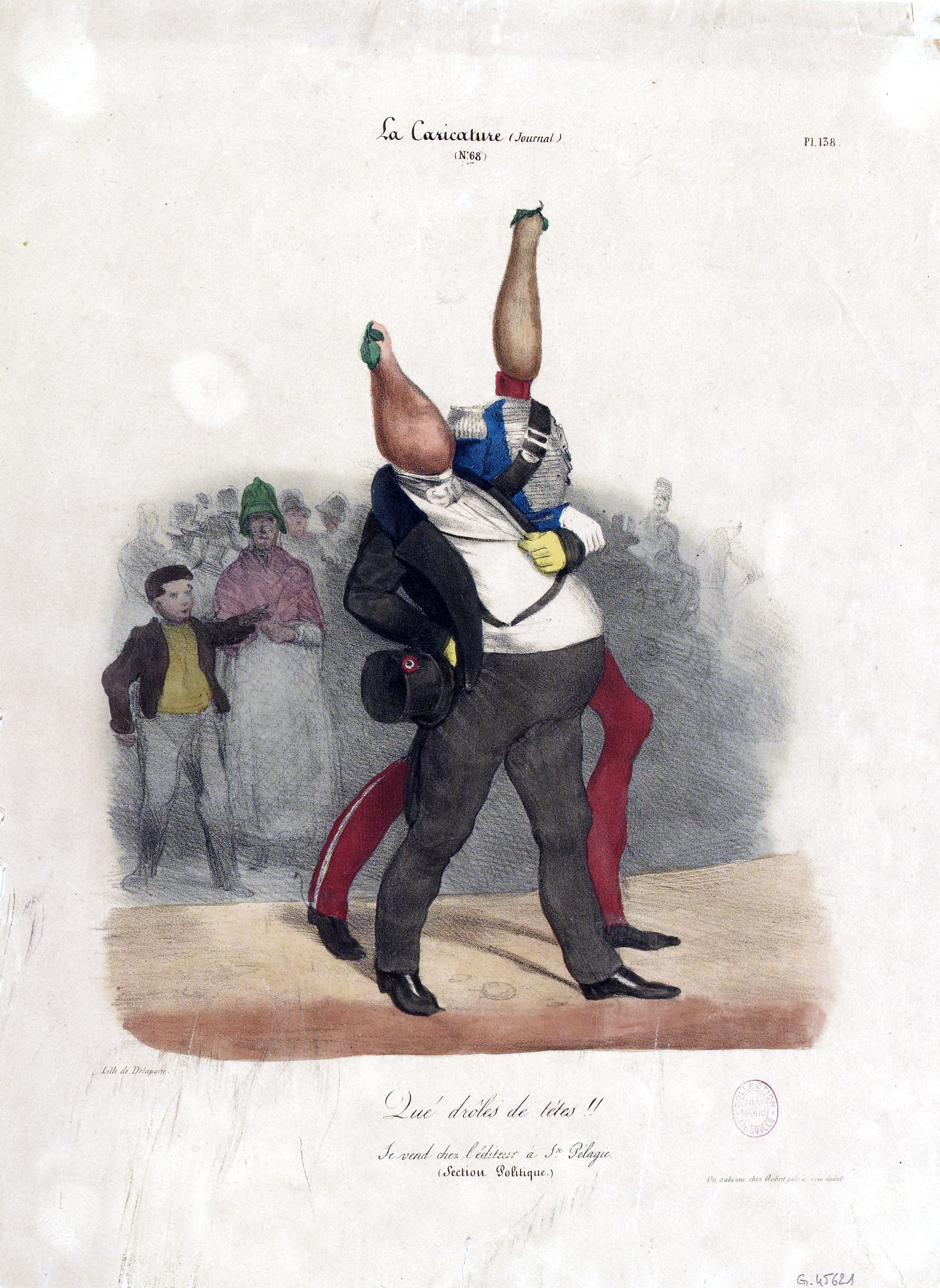
What funny-looking people!! Traviès, 1832.

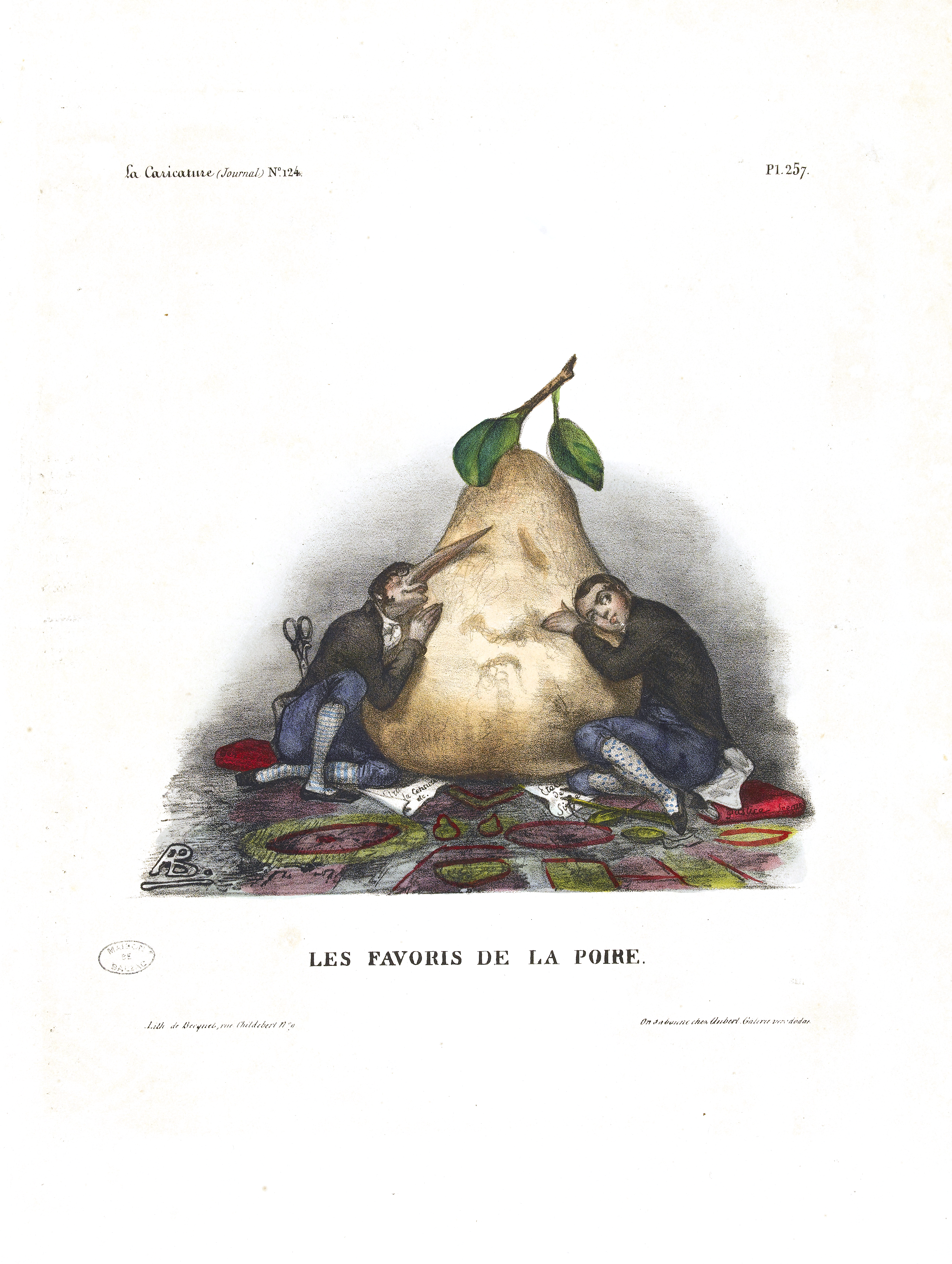
Les Favoris de la poire, Bouquet, 1833.

What funny-looking people!! exploits the difference between the rounded shape of Louis-Philippe's face and the elongated one of his son, Ferdinand-Philippe d'Orléans, more similar to a cucurbit than a pear, while likening the king to a “vegetable man” to suggest his stupidity. Les Favoris de la poire plays on the double meaning of the word “favoris” (favorites), which refers both to the royal cutlets and to two of his ministers, d'Argout and Barthe, whose posture may indicate that they are coaxing the king or seeking his protection.

In his essay on caricature, Charles Baudelaire noted that the equivalence between the king's face and a pear inevitably evoked a famous passage from Lavater's physiognomy, where he demonstrated Camper's theory of the facial angle by transforming the profile of the Apollo Belvedere into that of a frog. Lavater had conducted similar experiments on the faces of historical figures, such as Jesus and Apollo, to suggest that one could determine character from facial features. The physiognomic theory, which proposed that physical characteristics could reveal personality traits, was particularly influential in the early 19th century, especially among caricaturists who, like physiognomists, focused on the human face to identify and highlight deviations from conventional norms.

As Robert Patten recalled, Lavater himself analyzed facial types similar to that of Louis-Philippe, stating:

Large, massive bodies, small eyes, round, full, sagging cheeks, puffy lips, a sausage-shaped nose, and a pouch-like chin describe a class of men preoccupied with their heavy selves. These are, at heart, vain but insignificant men, ambitious yet lacking energy, quite docile with a pretense of knowing everything, unreliable, frivolous, and sensual—difficult to manage, greedy for everything but enjoying nothing.

The physiognomic theory thus provided a supposed scientific basis for the creation of the pear, suggesting a vegetalization of the person.

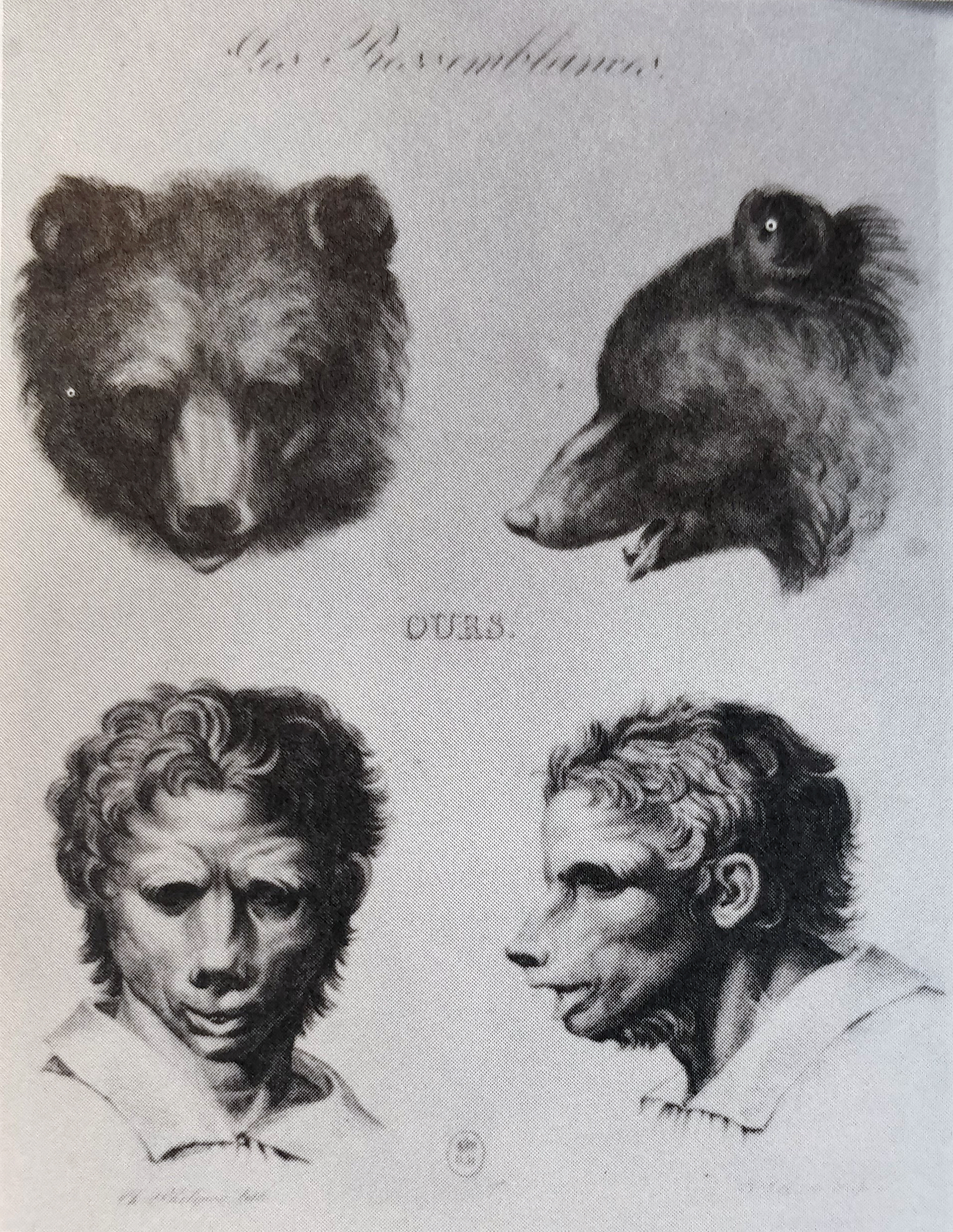
Les Ressemblances: Bear. Philipon (after Charles Le Brun), 1829.

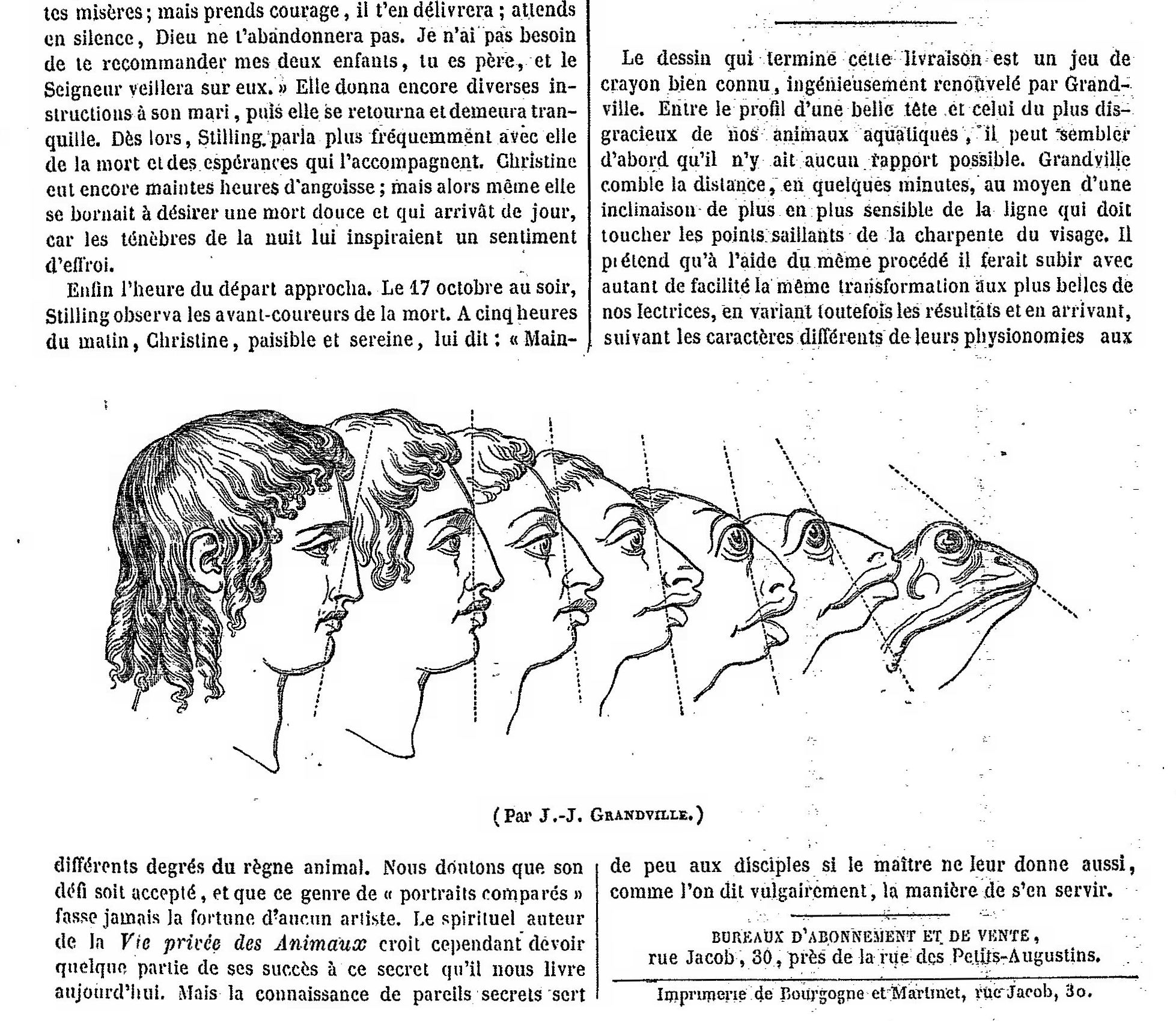
Heads of men and animals compared. Grandville, 1844.

The contributors to La Caricature are familiar with Lavater's theories, particularly Grandville, Traviès and Daumier, but also Philipon, who in 1829 illustrated a popular edition of Charles Le Brun, produced a series of lithographs the same year entitled Le Lavater des dames, which illustrated the emotions of a “typical” woman and in 1840 published a series of articles in Le Charivari on “the inside judged by the outside”.

=== The king's body ===
Other caricatures extended the pear's symbolic function to the entire body, reinforcing the metaphor by depicting a pear-shaped face on a pear-shaped body. These representations are connected to physiognomic analysis, as noted by Martial Guédron, a field that also examined signs derived from the entire body, particularly the abdomen. (Note: Lavater asserts that it is "certain that a large belly is not a positive sign of intelligence; it rather denotes a sensitivity always detrimental to intellectual faculties.") However, these caricatures focused on exaggerating the king's physical form, which, in turn, indirectly challenged his symbolic body—the foundation of his legitimacy.

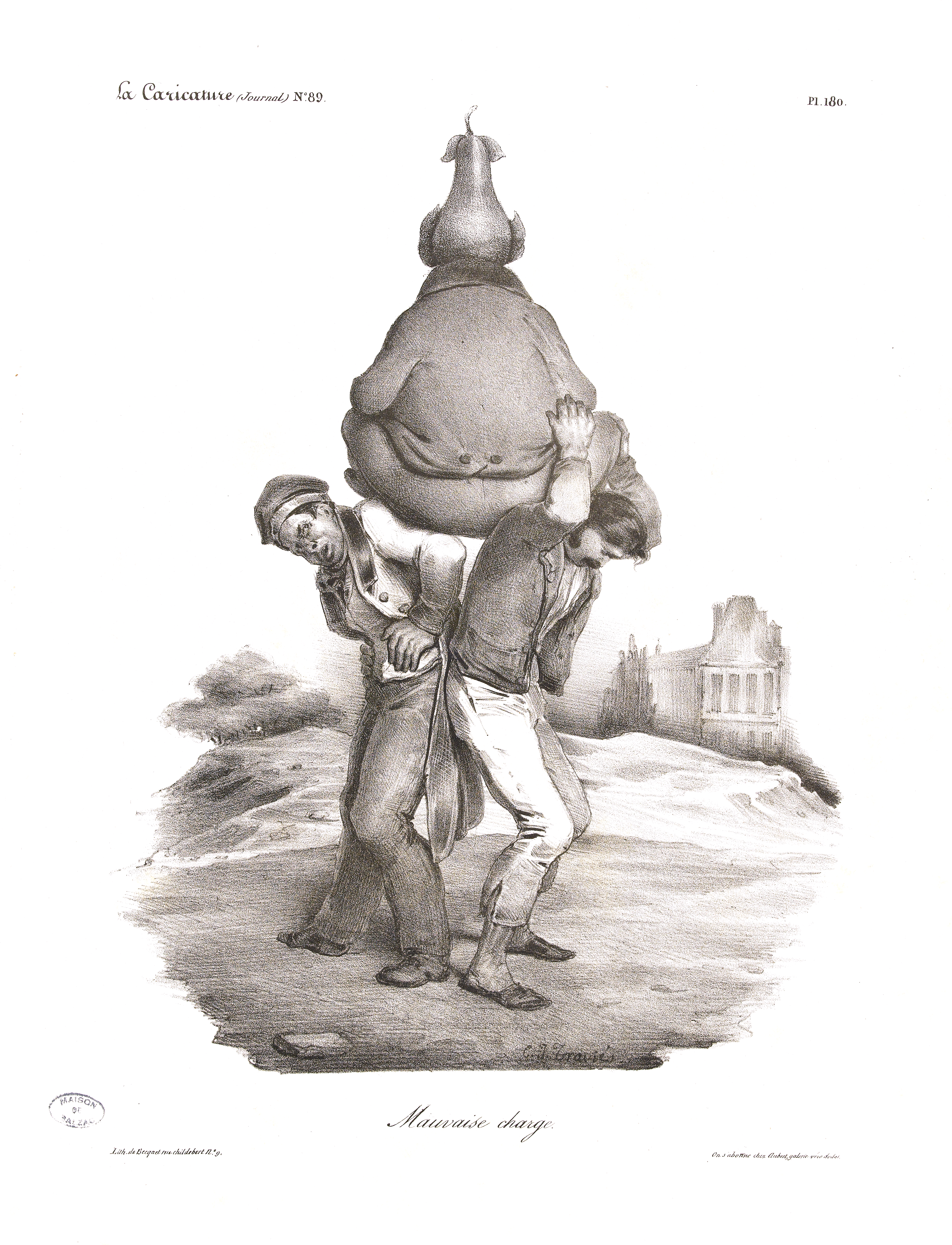
Mauvaise charge. Traviès, 1832.

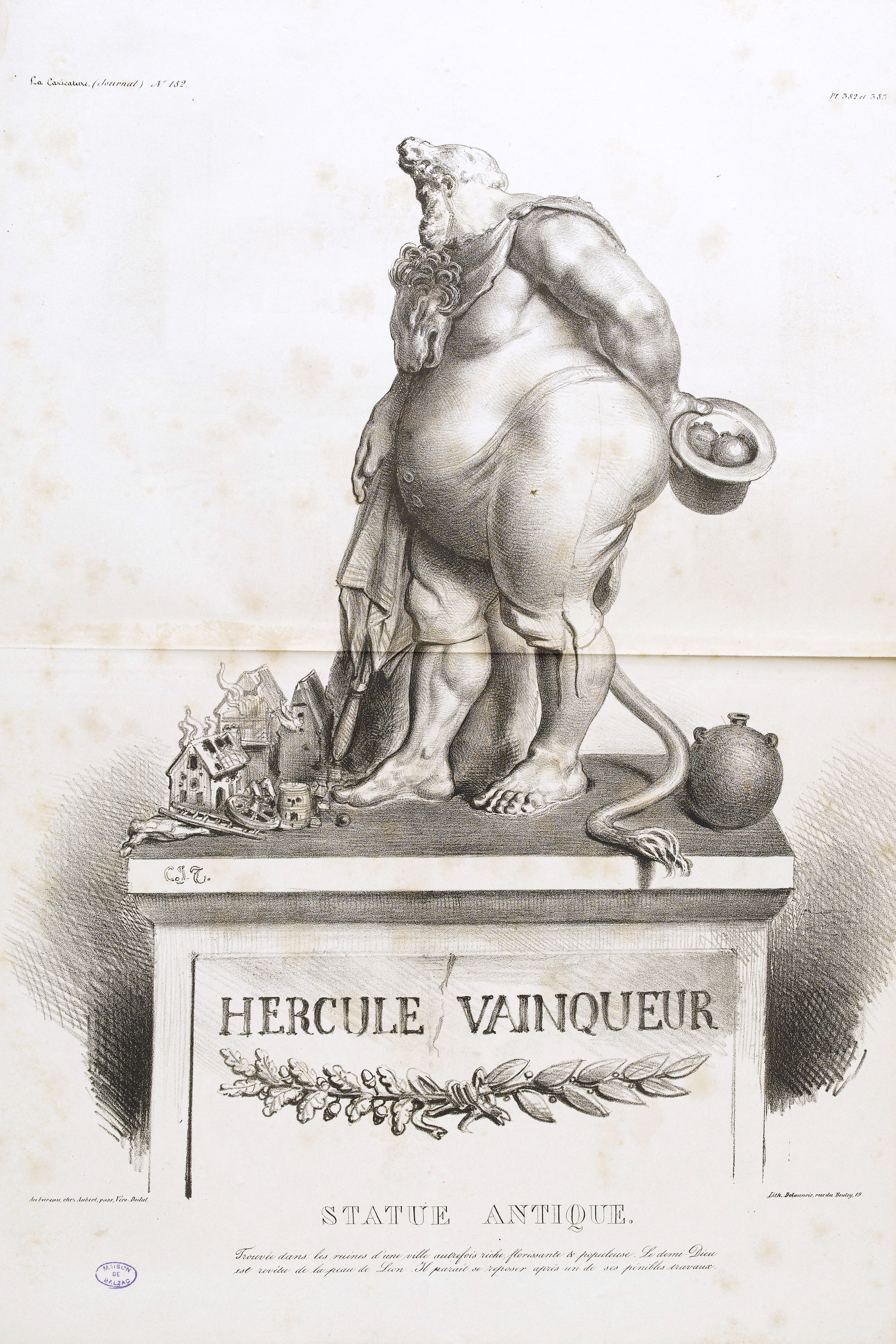
Statue antique, Traviès, 1834.

Mauvaise Charge, published in 1832, shows a doubling of the Pear metaphor, articulating the head and the ponderous body that weighs on the shoulders of the people. The explanation of the plate emphasizes that in the title the word “charge” signifies the burden borne by the people and the caricature as such. In Statue antique, whose “elegant and suave” forms are a parodic antithesis of the classical engravings of the Hercules Farnese, the bowed head acts as a leafy stem, while the stomach and hips suggest the base of the fruit.

James Cuno argues that the two visual metaphors—the pear-shaped face and the pear-shaped body—are not independent of each other. He states, "They do not exist alongside each other as independent and interchangeable metaphors, but their meanings are understood together." Thus, the pear metaphor connects "the king's prominent facial feature, his large jaws, with his thick belly and hips, or more specifically, his face with his buttocks."

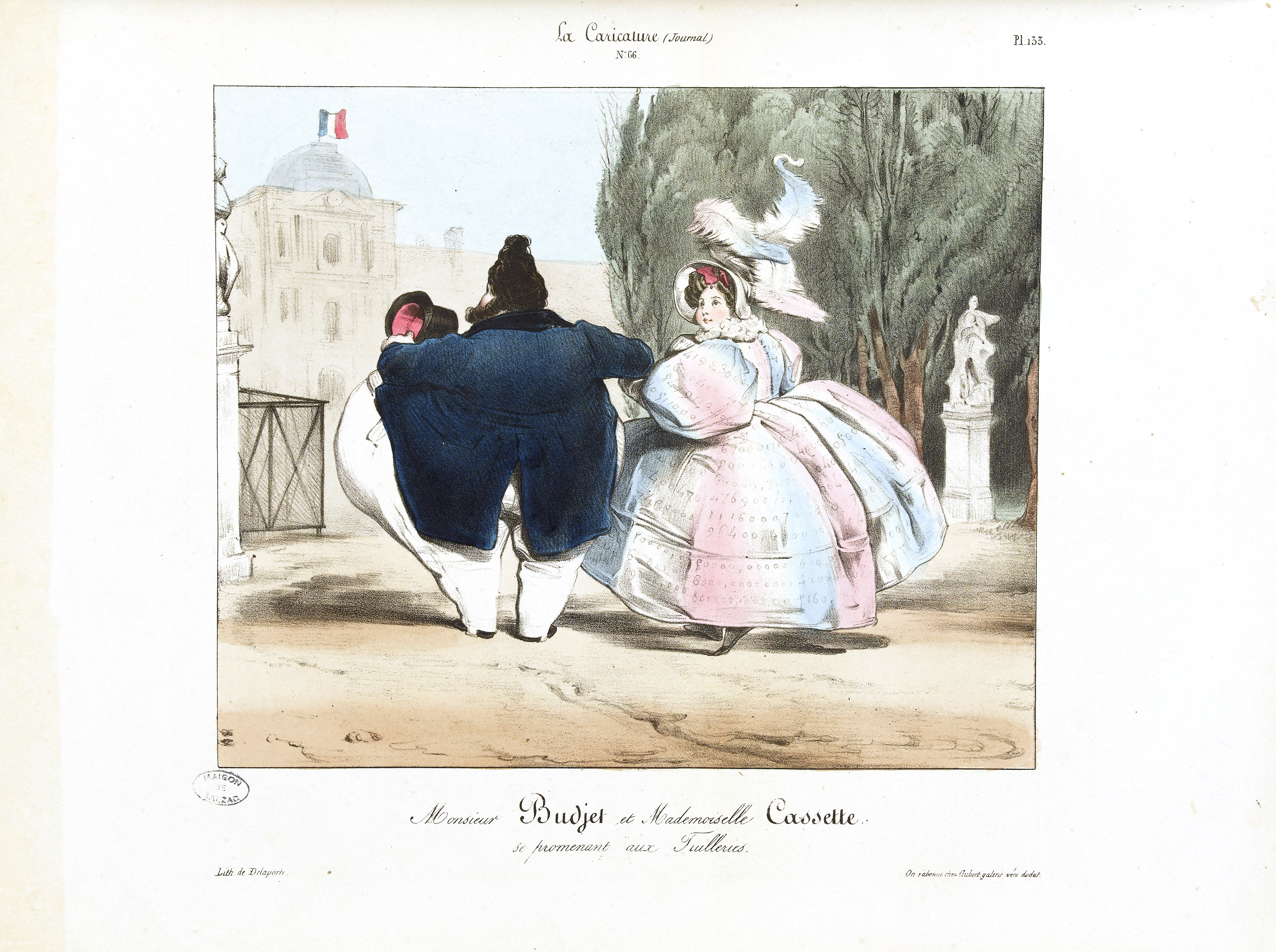
Monsieur Budget and Mademoiselle Cassette taking a stroll in the Tuileries. Pierre Numa Bassaget, 1832.

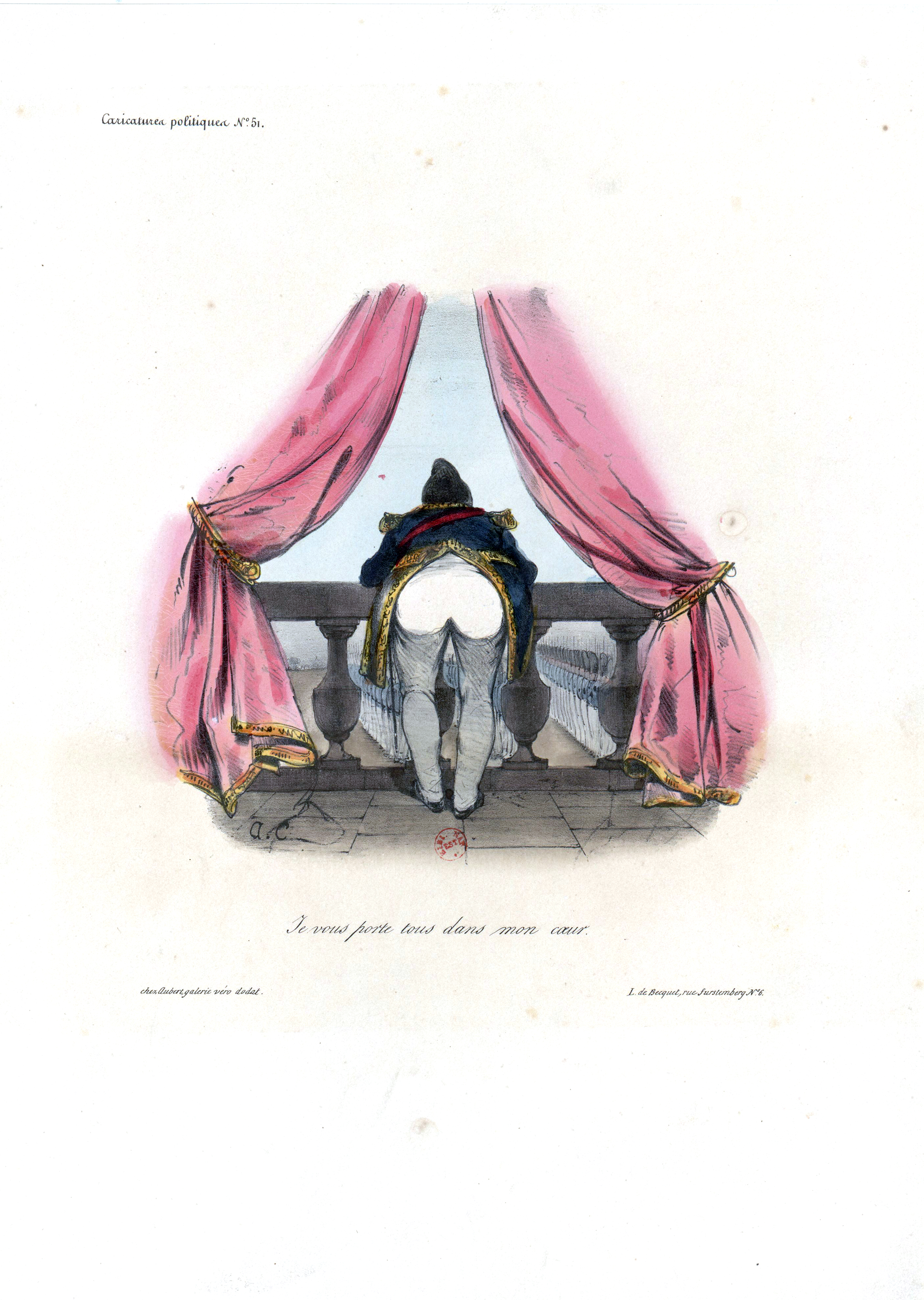
I hold you all in my heart. Alexandre Casati, 1833.

The caricatures on the king's body equating his person and his belly or his buttocks often show him from behind, to reduce the risk of prosecution for insulting the king, while providing sufficient information to identify the subject. Monsieur Budget and Mademoiselle Cassette strolling in the Tuileries, where the shape of the Poire is discreetly evoked, relates the king's obesity to that of his budget, or even his civil list. In Je vous porte tous dans mon cœur, where the king addresses his people from his balcony, the Poire, depicted on his buttocks and in the crack of the curtains, contradicts what he is saying.

=== Scatological connotations ===
The identification of the face with the buttocks through the pear metaphor introduced scatological connotations, drawing on numerous precedents in caricature from the 18th and early 19th centuries.

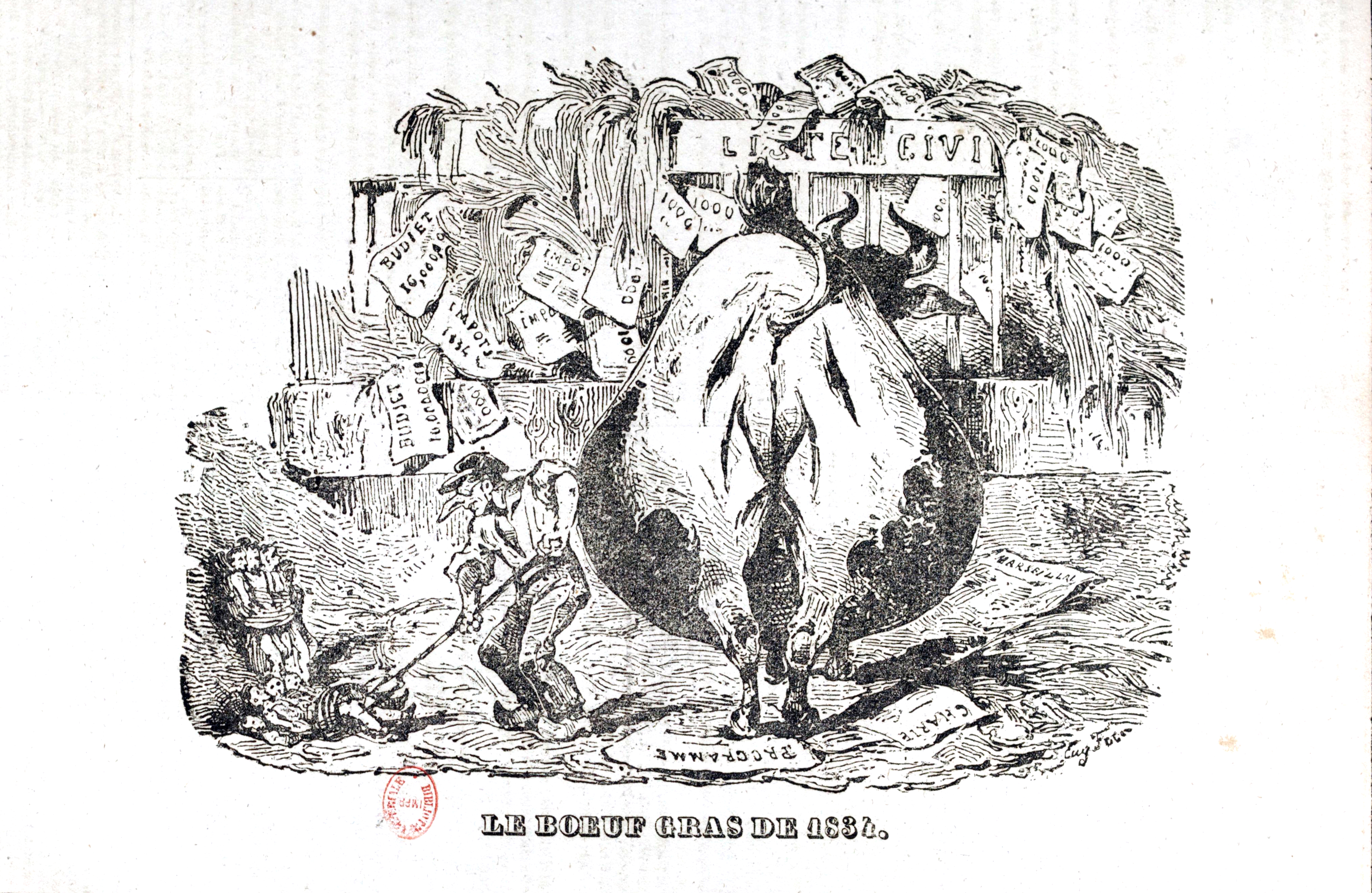
The Bœuf Gras of 1834, February 1834.

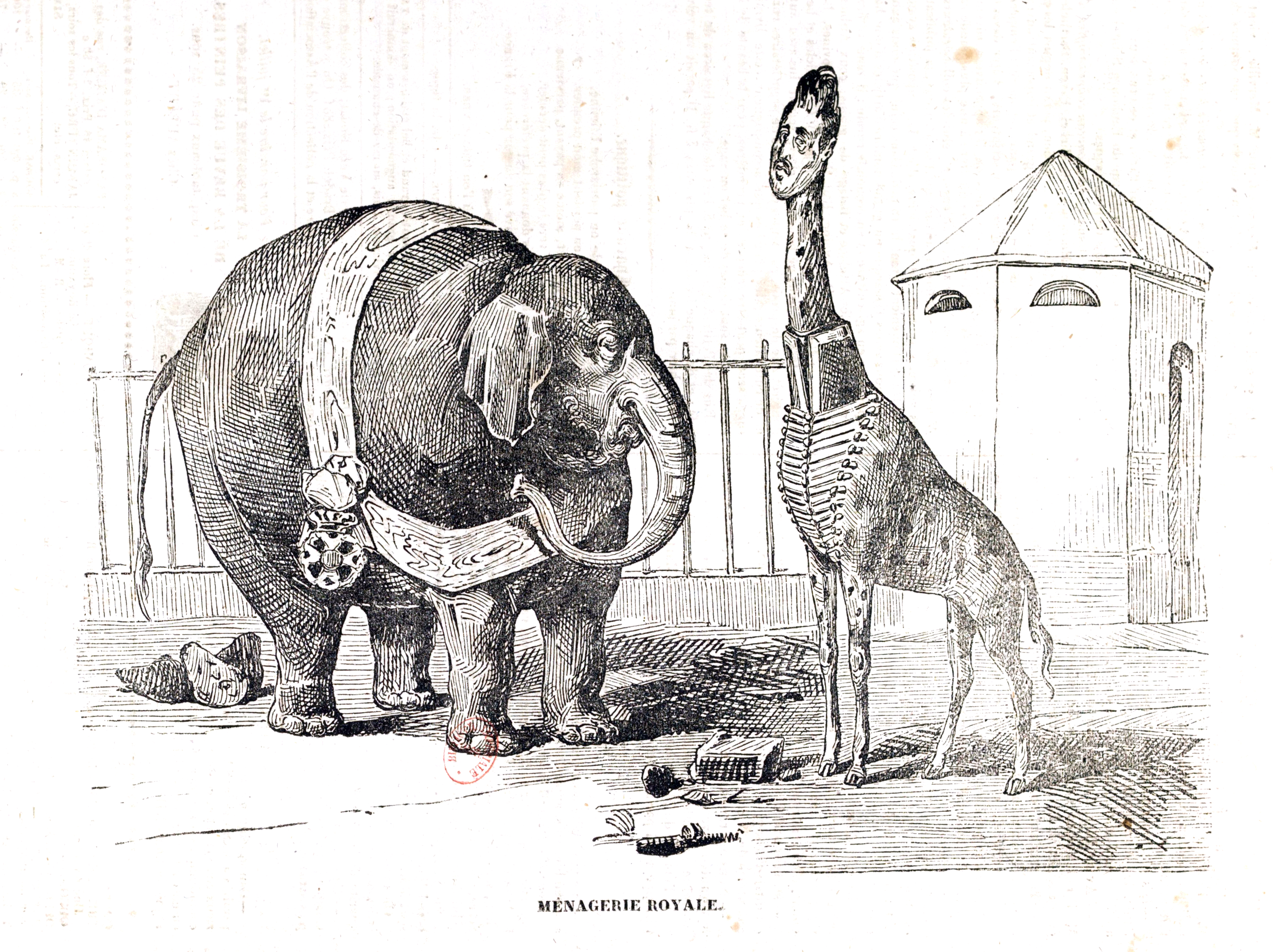
Royal Menagerie, June 1834.

The scurrilous dimension of the Pear is present, in a more direct way, in two anonymous caricatures published in 1834 in Le Charivari, Le Bœuf Gras in 1834, and Royal Menagerie, where the elephant's droppings are shaped like a pear.

These scatological connotations are exploited by Daumier in several caricatures published by Aubert in December 1831.

One such caricature, Departure for Lyon, which references the Canut Revolt and the deployment of Louis-Philippe's son to negotiate with the rebels, portrays the king with a pear-shaped head offering his son a slice of bread covered in a brown substance from a pot labeled "butter." However, the pot's shape, resembling a chamber pot, suggests that the substance inside might not be intended for the negotiations.

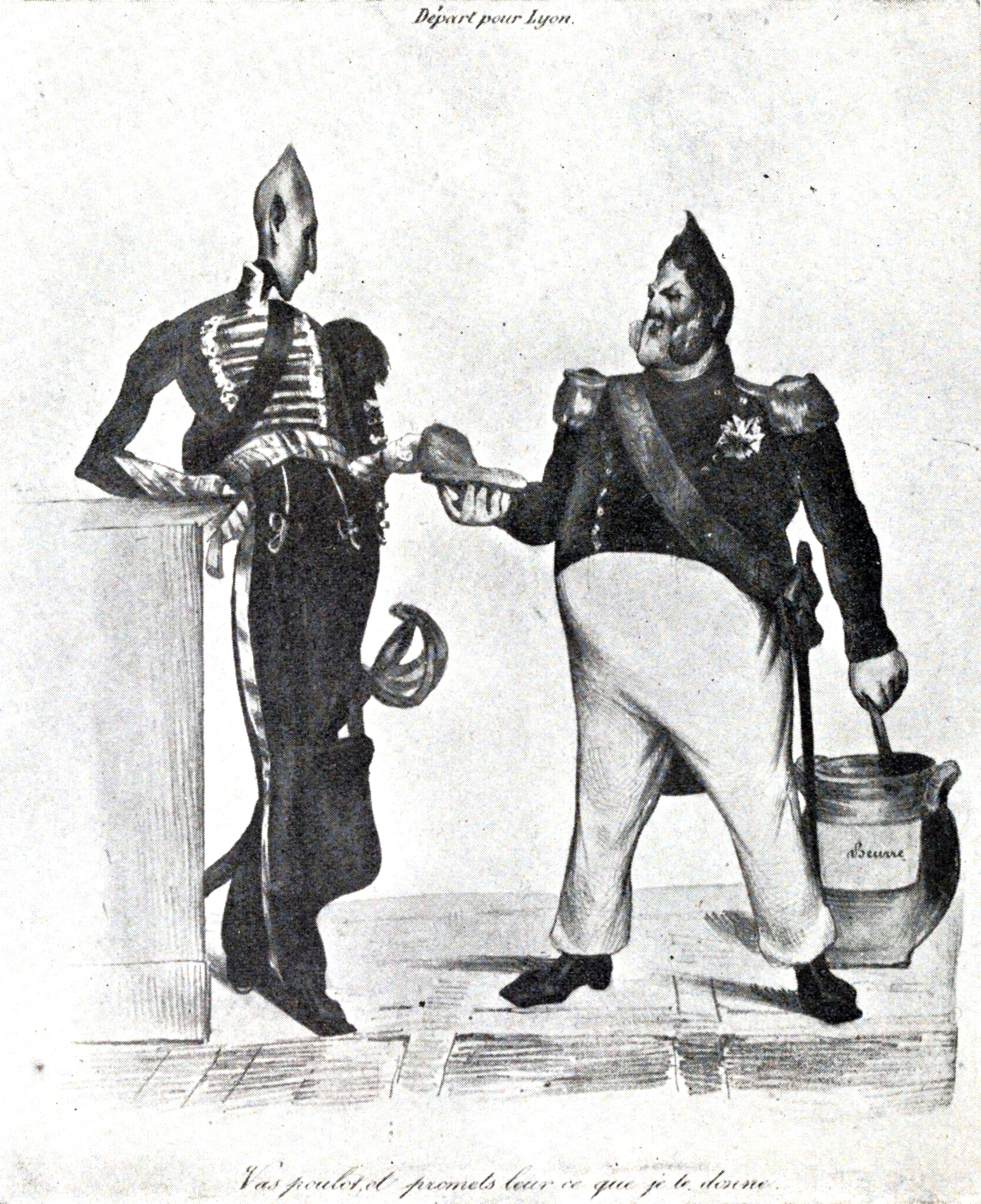
Departure for Lyon, 1st state, December 1831.

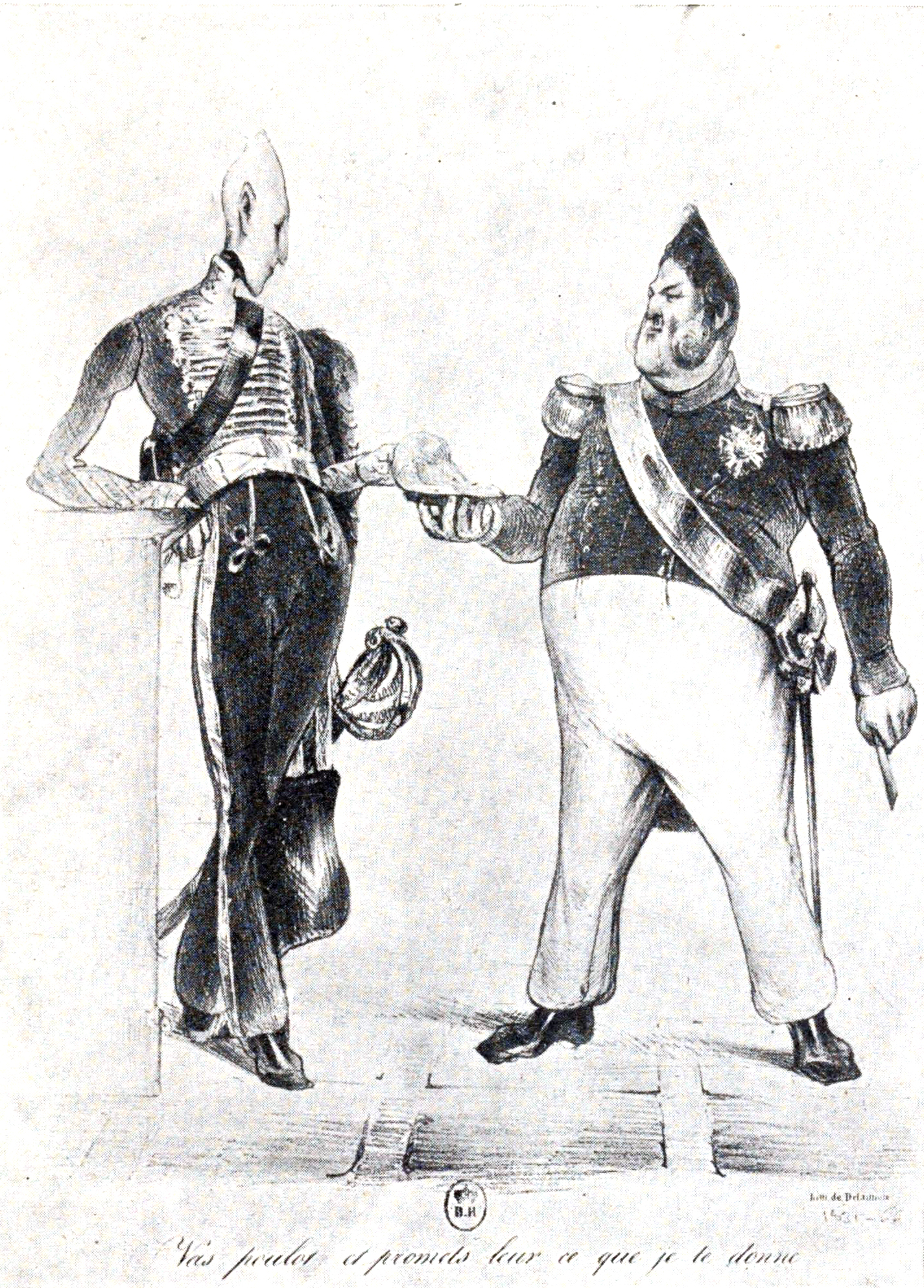
Departure for Lyon, 2nd state, December 1831.

Once the first state of the print had been registered, Daumier produced a second version, submitted for legal deposit on December 5, 1831, in which the pot of “butter” had disappeared.

In Gargantua, a lithograph referencing the distribution of Legion of Honor medals, submitted by Aubert for legal deposit on December 16, 1831— (Note: According to Loÿs Delteil, the legal deposit date is December 15, 1831.)one month after Philipon's sketches and also seized by authorities— Daumier depicts the king seated on a chamber pot throne, consuming baskets of money on the Place de la Concorde. (Note: Louis XVI had been beheaded in Place de la Concorde, which Louis-Philippe had redeveloped by placing the obelisk there.) The resulting excrement produces medals.

As Elizabeth Childs observes, "the undeniably pyramidal shape of Gargantua's head, defined by his ample sideburns and pointed hairstyle, emphatically recalls the pear. The rounded pyramid shape of his entire body echoes the bulbous form of the fruit." Ségolène Le Men asserts that in this caricature, Daumier "not only attacks the king personally, from the configuration of his face to the corpulence of his entire body but also critiques the bourgeois monarchy as a regime" through the "physiological metaphor of the digestive system."

Although the size and title of the first state of this lithograph suggest it was originally intended for publication in La Caricature, (Note: The first state of Gargantua features at the top, above the title, La Caricature, and at the bottom right, "On s'abonne chez Aubert," while these mentions disappeared in the second state.) it was ultimately published separately and briefly displayed in the windows of Aubert's shop, where it "delighted enthusiasts." Philipon justified this decision by claiming the "weak execution of the plate", though it was more likely a precaution against foreseeable legal consequences. Nevertheless, Philipon feigned ignorance regarding the reason for its seizure:

I was right to shout to the jurors: 'They'll end up making you see this resemblance where it doesn't exist!' Because Gargantua does not resemble Louis-Philippe: he may have a narrow upper head and a broad lower one, a Bourbon nose, and thick sideburns. But far from displaying the air of honesty, liberality, and nobility that so eminently distinguishes Louis-Philippe from all other living kings... Mr. Gargantua has a repulsive face and an air of voracity that makes coins tremble in one's pocket.

During the trial held in February 1832, Daumier defended himself by claiming he had not intended to represent the king personally but symbolically depicted the government's bloated budget. He argued that the small figures gathered around the central character wore the same clothing, had the same silhouette, and shared the same physiognomy as him. Nonetheless, he was fined 500 francs and sentenced to six months in prison. (Note: In a memorandum addressed to the king appealing his conviction, Daumier presents Gargantua as an "inoffensive drawing" and obsequiously describes himself as the "very humble, very faithful, and very obedient subject" of Louis-Philippe, even though he had just published the plate titled Très humbles, très soumis, très obéissants... et surtout très voraces Sujets in La Caricature in February 1832.)

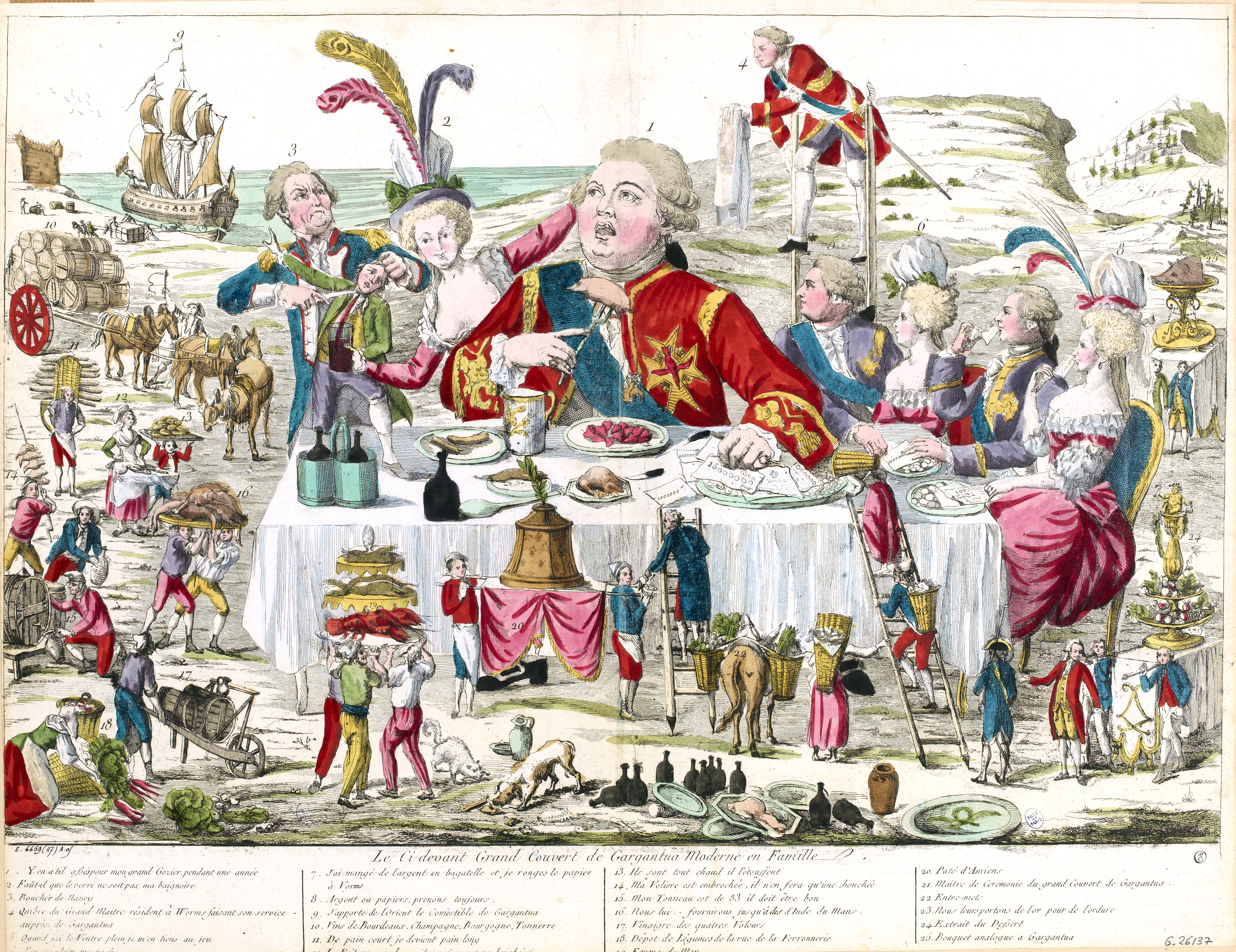
Le Ci devant Grand Couvert de Gargantua Moderne en Famille. Anonymous, 1791.

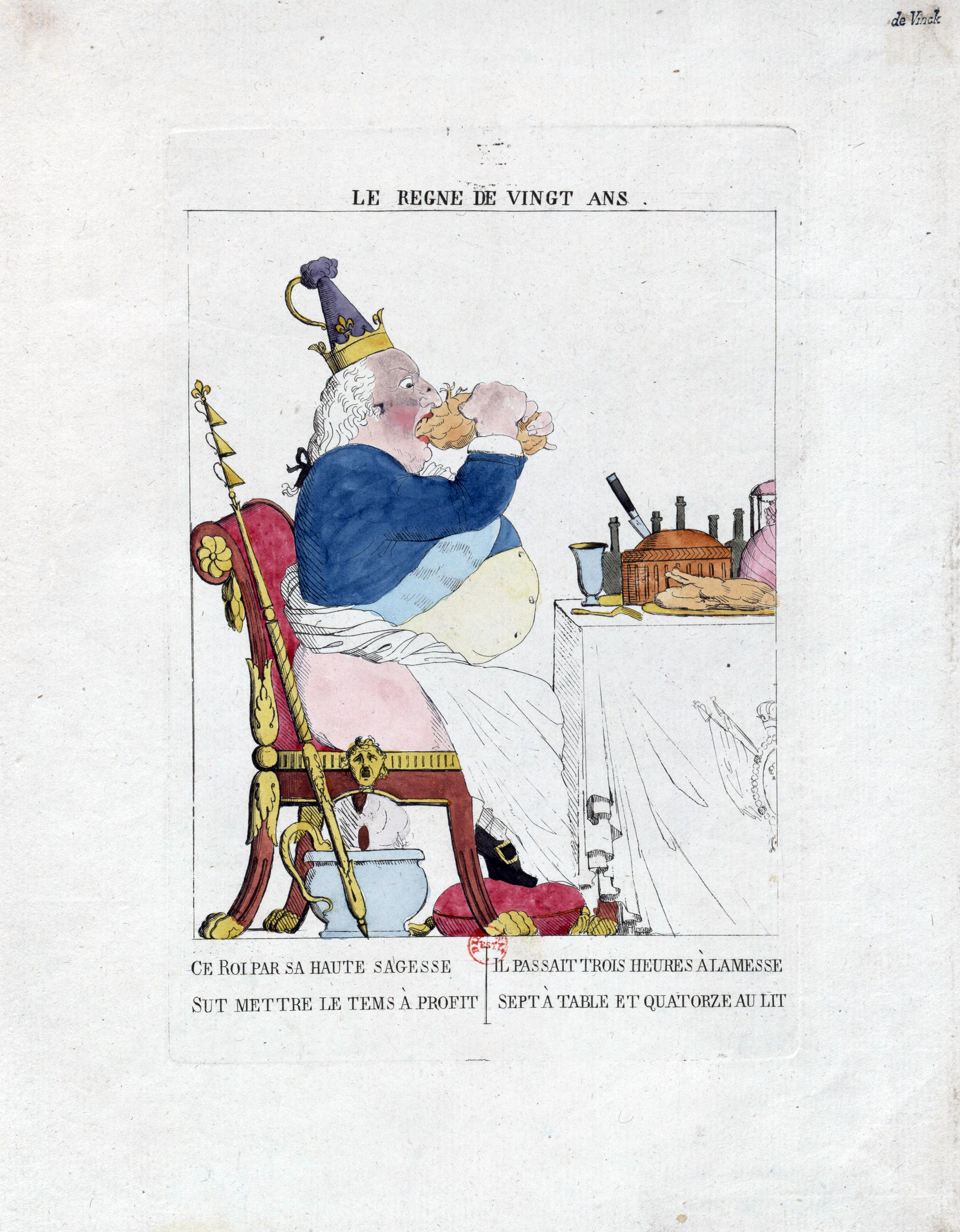
The Twenty Years' Reign, 1815.

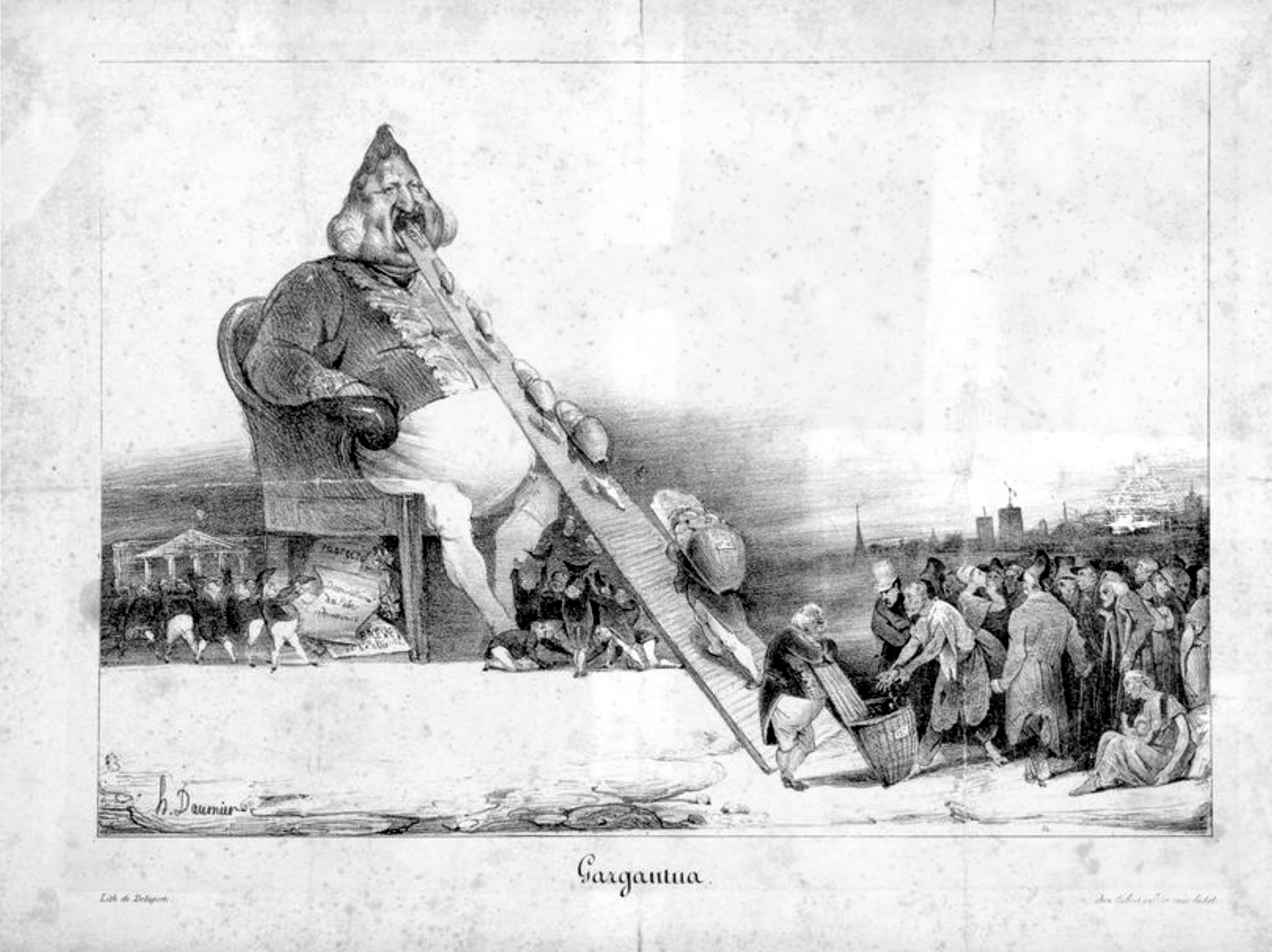
Gargantua, 2nd state, December 1831.

Although the artists of La Caricature mainly claimed the influence of their English predecessors, the Rabelaisian reference and the very composition of the image seem to attest to the influence of a revolutionary caricature of Louis XVI in Gargantua (1791), where the royal ogres feast on the blood of their subjects, and which attests to the graphic use of Gargantua during the revolutionary period to represent the excesses of the monarchy. The representation of defecation, particularly exploited during the Revolution by Jacques-Louis David, is used in The Twenty Years' Reign, a caricature of Louis XVIII, in conjunction with the theme of gluttony, and in Origine de l'ordre du lys, a caricature of Charles X, with the production of medals.

The scatological dimension of the pear was also exploited by Traviès in two caricatures from 1832. Traviès likened the pear to a latrine, playing on the expression's dual meaning to suggest both Louis-Philippe's symbolic gluttony and his precarious situation, being "in deep trouble" due to a lack of support. To evade censorship, the focus was placed on the supposed depersonalization of the subject, with the title and commentary ostensibly targeting the "juste milieu" political policy rather than the king himself.

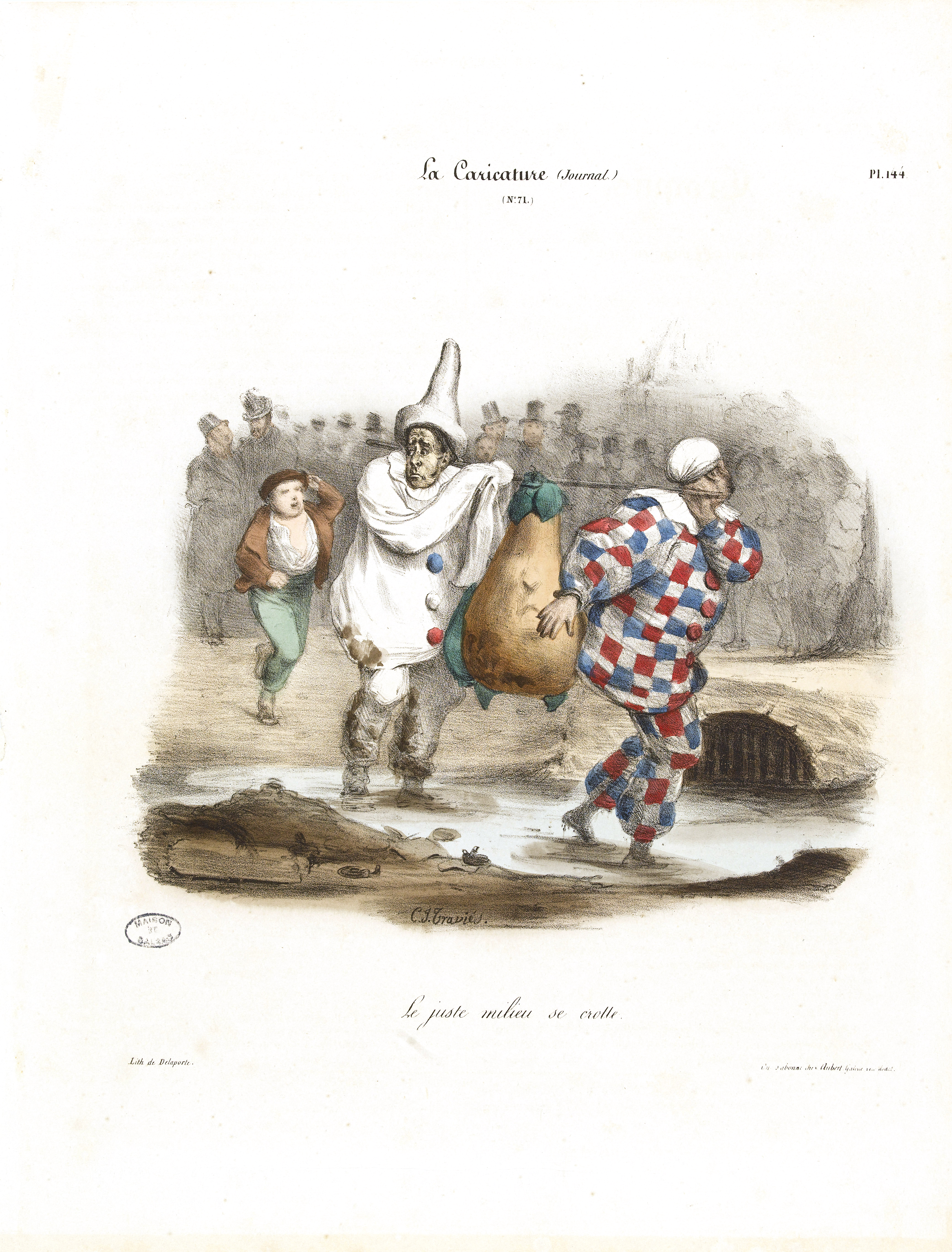
Le Juste Milieu se crotte. Traviès, 1832.

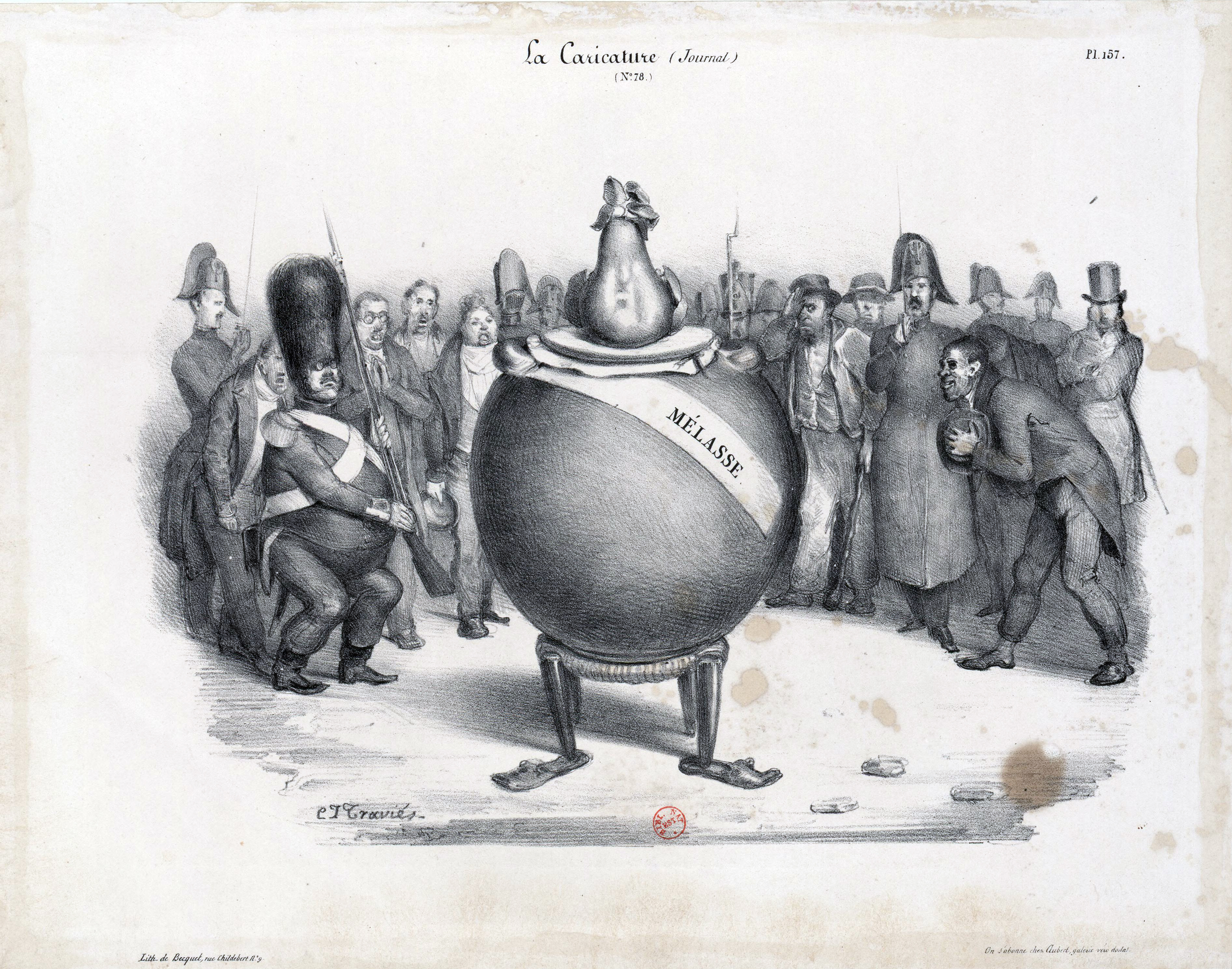
Le Pot de mélasse, portrait of the Juste-Milieu. Traviès, 1832

Neither the king nor the tinette are named in either of these two caricatures. The commentary of Le Juste Milieu se crotte specifies that the two scumbags are carrying “a mass shaped like a bladder, a bun, a pear, or any other object with a pyramidal appearance”, of which the public, “having noticed the mud covering it, [...] thought it must be the Just-Middle.” The one in Le Pot de mélasse, a portrait of the Juste-Milieu, invites the grocers, who are supposed to be the regime's mainstay, to prostrate themselves before this “pot of molasses”.

=== Sexual connotations ===
The identification of the pear with the buttocks does not fully capture the range of anatomical and metaphorical connotations often associated with it. In several analyses, James Cuno explores the phallic dimension of the pear metaphor, examining its meanings and evolution. He suggests that the metaphor may carry both sexual and aggressive undertones, which were evident in the work of contributors to La Caricature. According to Cuno, the metaphor "derives from two fundamental and interconnected impulses—sexual and aggressive, obscene and subversive." However, Alain Vaillant prefers the term "obscenity" to describe the provocative representations of sexuality in art during this period, differentiating it from "pornography," which he reserves for the commercial exploitation of sexuality. In a speech to the Chamber of Deputies on August 4, 1835, defending the reinstatement of censorship, Jean-Charles Persil criticized the proliferation of such "obscene engravings", describing them as degrading to their illustrators.

Cuno argues that the pear metaphor often aligns with the image of a phallus, contributing to a satirical depiction of Louis-Philippe. This metaphor is linked to the frequent appearance of the clyster in caricatures, especially after General Lobau's actions in May 1831, where the visual symbol of the clyster was associated with the repression of opposition. The pear and the clyster became intertwined in caricatures, further reinforcing their symbolic connection to the monarchy.

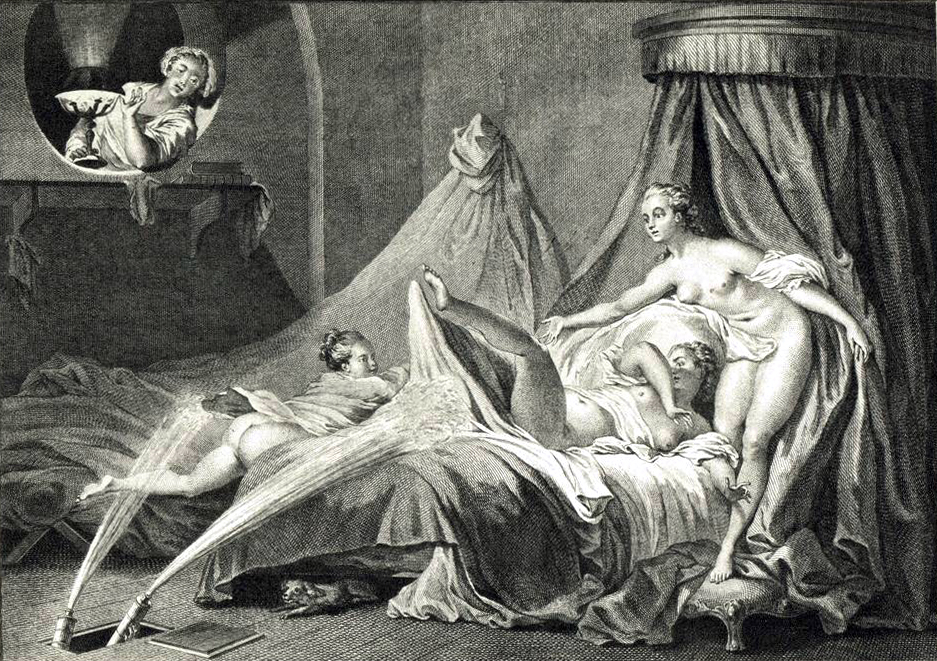
The Water Spouts. After Jean-Honoré Fragonard, 1778.

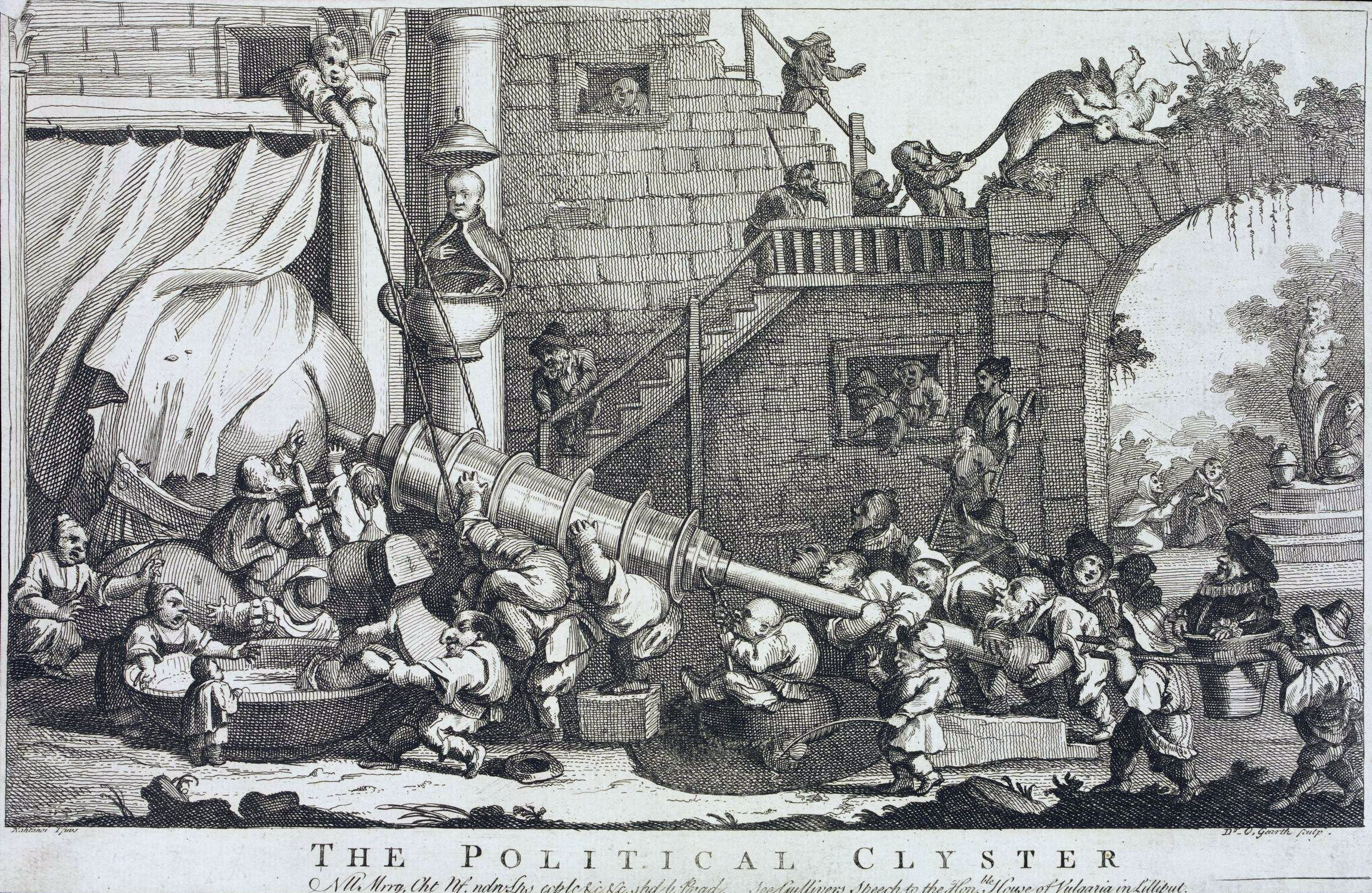
The Political Clyster. William Hogarth, 1726.

In 18th-century engravings, the clyster frequently had an erotic meaning, as seen in Fragonard's work and exploited by Philipon in a lithograph from 1829 entitled Apothicaire: servez la bavaroise. It then took on a political meaning, for example in La Chute du ministre Linotte (1792), and more specifically the sodomization of the people in Hogarth's The Political Clyster.

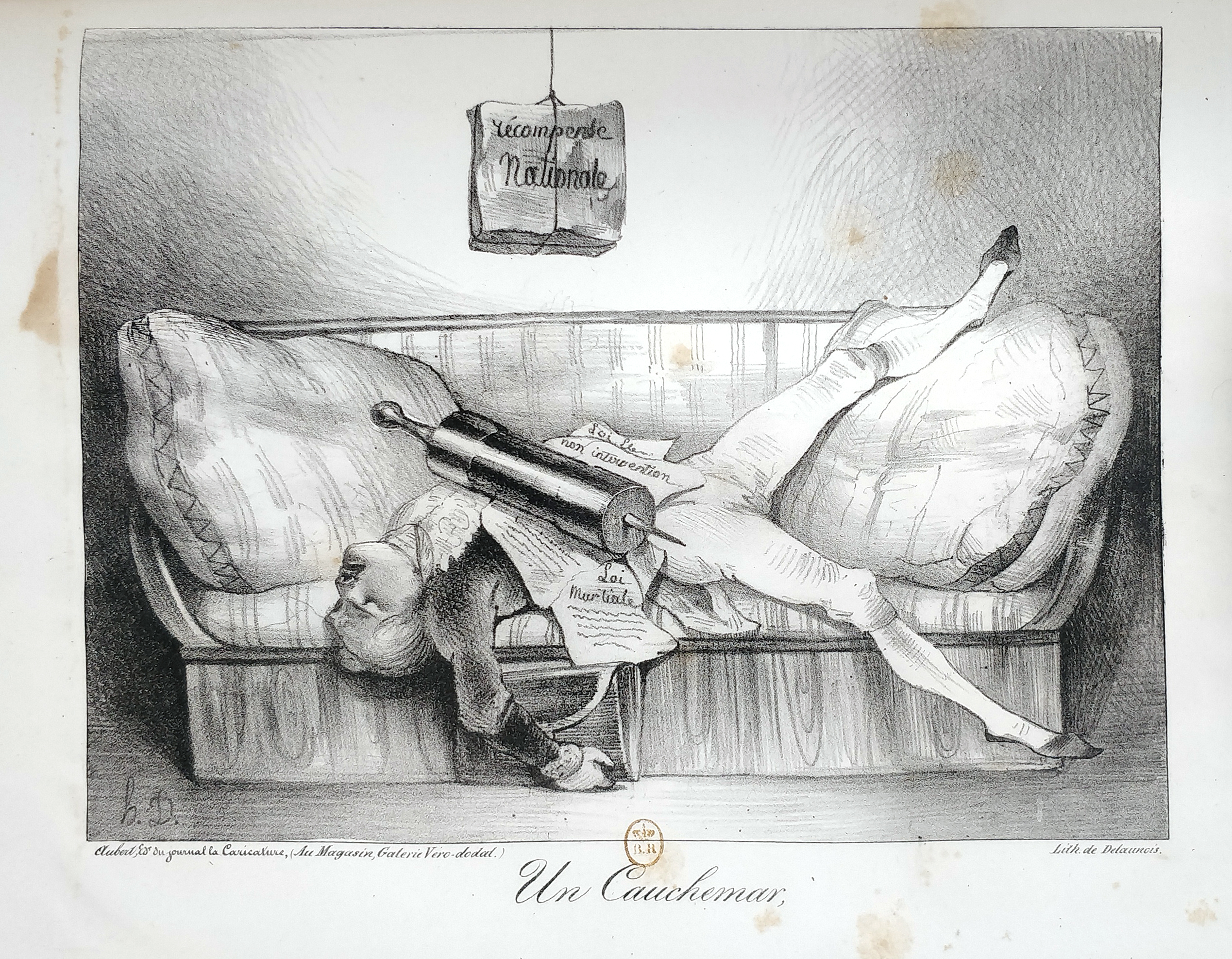
A nightmare. Daumier, 1831.

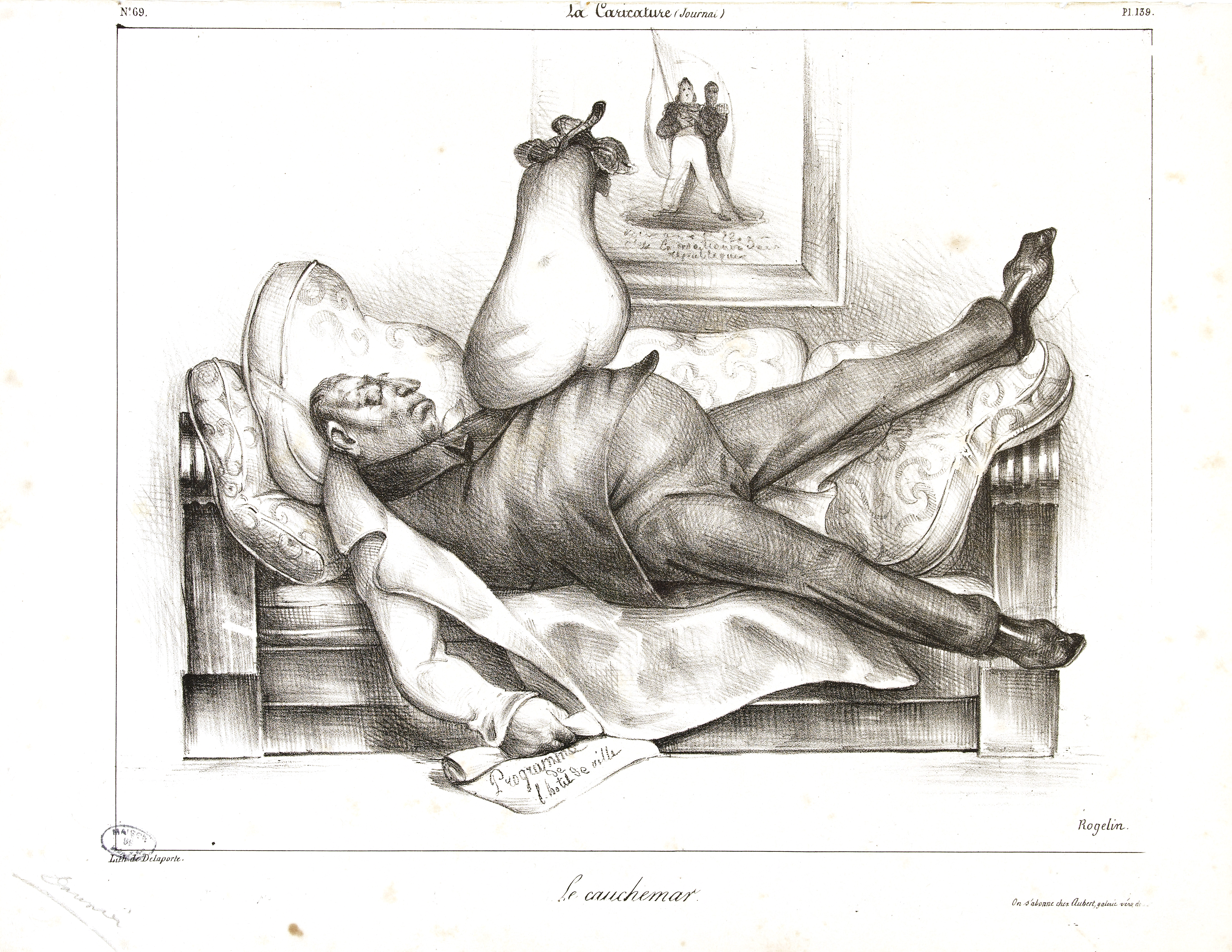
The Nightmare. Daumier, 1832.

In June 1831, Philipon published Un cauchemar (A Nightmare), a lithograph by Daumier based on The Nightmare by Fuseli. (Note: The depiction of a political nightmare in the manner of Füssli was a trope of English caricature at the time, as evidenced by George Cruikshank's The Night Mare (1816) or Robert Seymour's John Bull's Night Mare (c. 1828). Daumier's version was reused by Alexandre Casati in Le Cauchemar de la poire (1833), which plays on the phallic connotations of the Phrygian cap, previously exploited in a 1793 engraving by Piat Sauvage, Le Cauchemar de l'aristocratie.) The caricature depicts a young Bonapartist haunted by the prospect of martial law, represented by the enema. In a second version, entitled Le Cauchemar and published on February 23, 1832 in La Caricature, the young man is replaced by La Fayette and the enema by the pear, whose shape and placement suggest, according to Cuno, a phallic meaning and, consequently, the transfer of the scatological and erotic connotations associated with the enema. This second lithograph refers to the apocryphal remark made by La Fayette in 1830 about the “best of republics,” recalled by the print on the wall and the July program at the foot of the bed: in erotic and political terms, La Fayette was “screwed.”

David Kerr notes that the various meanings attributed to the clyster are characteristic of La Caricature's collaborative nature, with the metaphor evolving from traditional scatological and sexual associations to also represent the political regime of the July Monarchy.

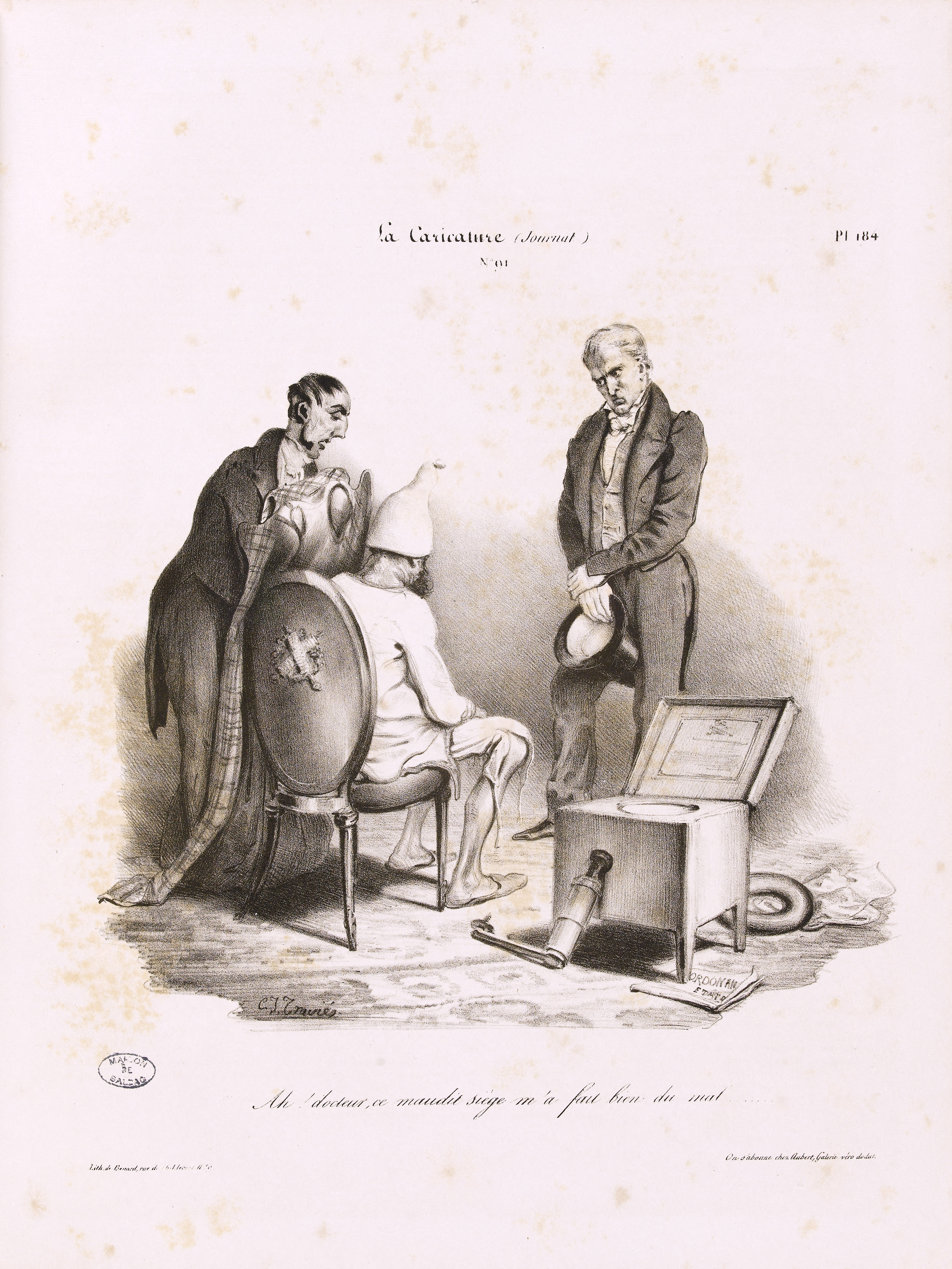
Ah! Doctor, this damned seat has done me a lot of harm, Traviès, 1832.

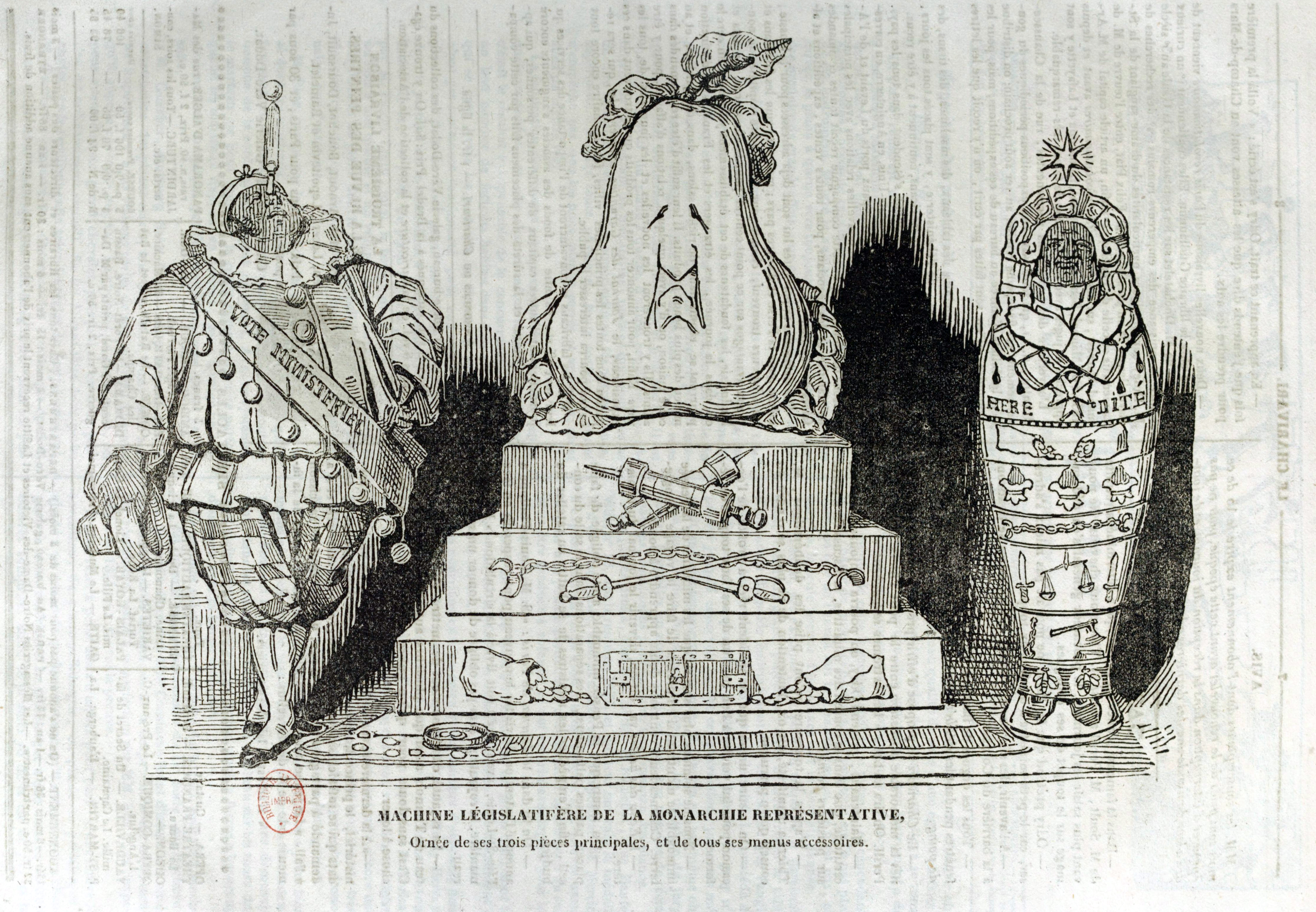
Legislative machine of the representative monarchy, complete with its three main parts and all its small accessories. Daumier, 1834

Ah! Doctor, this damned siege has done me a lot of harm, published on August 2, 1832 in La Caricature, shortly after the republican insurrection in Paris in June 1832 that led the government to declare a state of siege, shows a weakened and constipated king, whom an enema is not enough to relieve. The latter instrument, which had been the government's weapon, was thus turned against the king. In Machine législatifère de la monarchie représentative, ornée de ses trois pièces principales et de tous ses menus accessoires, which uses Daumier's signature to depict the king as a pear in the engraving Les Poires, the enema is also associated with the figure of the pear to symbolize the entire regime.

Phallic connotations linked to the pear also appear in other caricatures, where they are associated with aggressive insinuations of castration or sodomy.

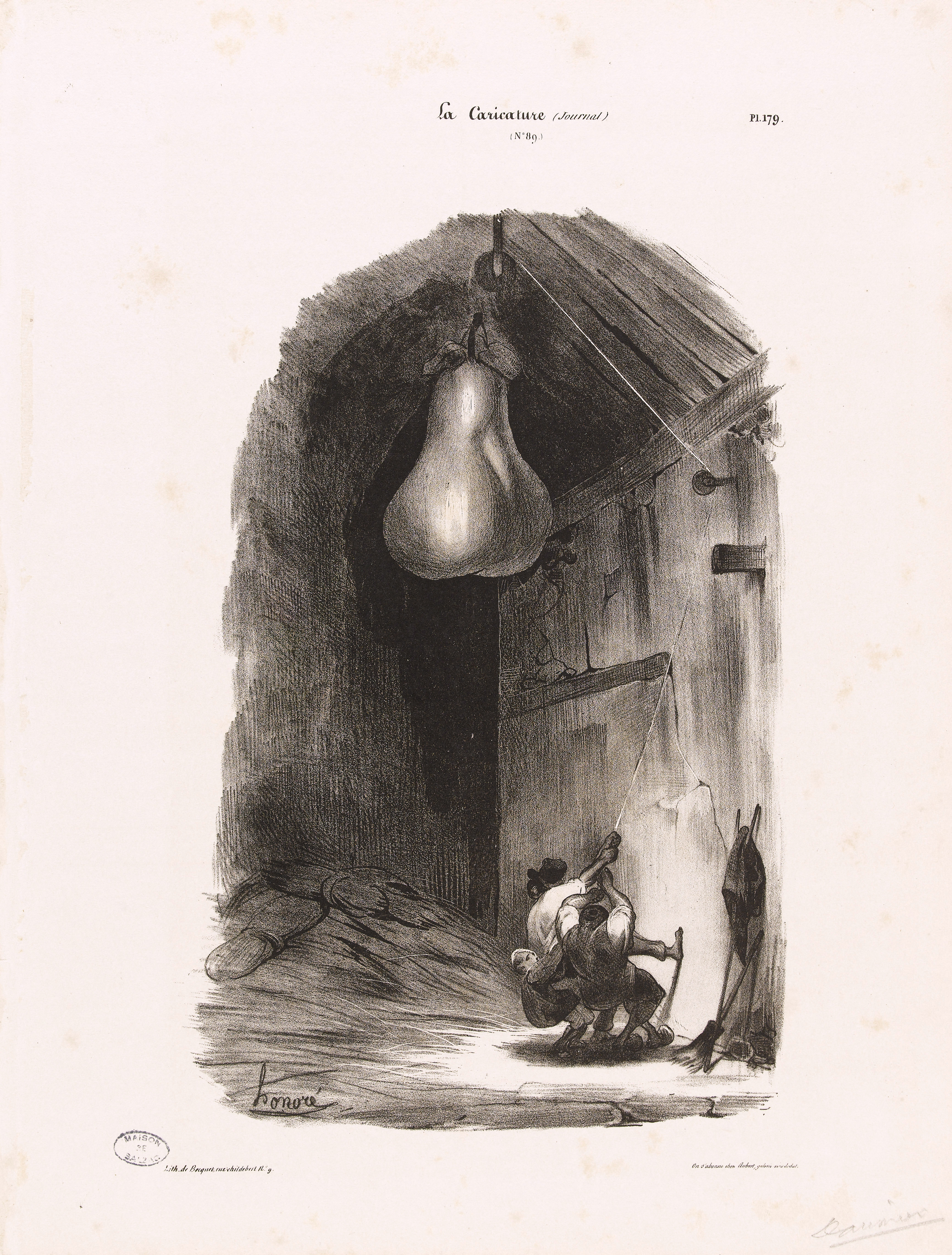
Untitled, Daumier, 1832.

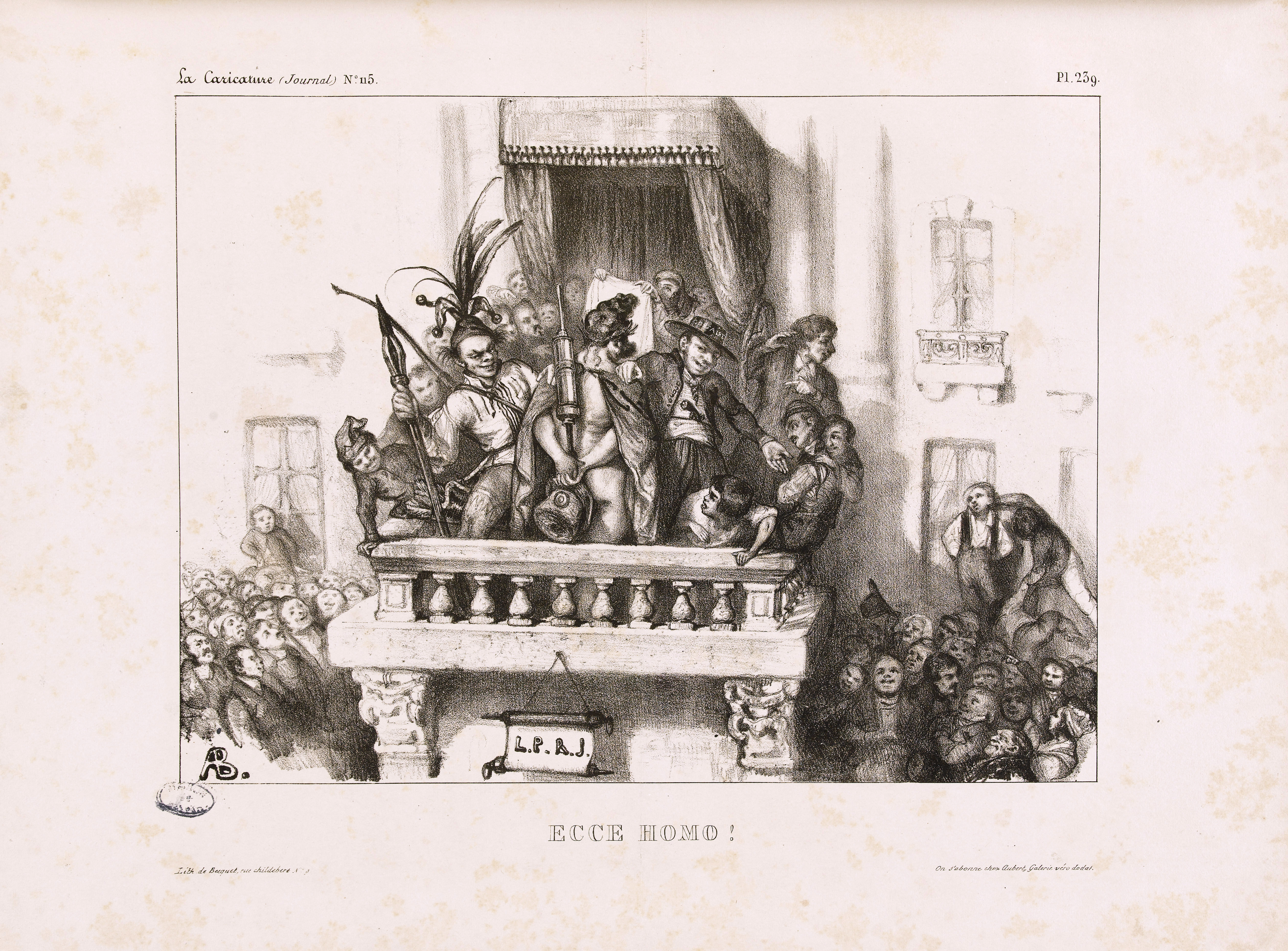
Ecce Homo Auguste Bouquet, 1833.

An untitled caricature by Daumier published on July 19, 1832, in La Caricature, in which it is described as having a “baroque, trivial language, yet clear and expressive,” shows the hanging of a pear which, according to Cuno, has an obvious “phallic quality.” Ecce homo, inspired by an etching of the same name by Rembrandt, is also a parody of the supposed accolade of the city hall, where La Fayette is replaced by the fool of La Caricature and the balusters of the balcony by pears. For Cuno, this lithograph evokes a deprivation of masculinity and suggests a situation of sodomy.

Overall, Cuno suggests that the association of the pear with Louis-Philippe reflects both masculine and emasculating qualities. This duality is not seen as contradictory but rather as a reflection of the political tensions at the time, where the king's actions, particularly in terms of repression and censorship, were depicted in a way that hinted at his eventual downfall.

=== Graphical representation of the Juste Milieu ===
According to several authors, the pear has been interpreted as a graphical representation of the juste milieu, a political concept associated with moderation and balance. The term juste milieu defined the political stance of the July Monarchy, as articulated by Louis-Philippe in January 1831:

Undoubtedly, the July Revolution must bear its fruits; but this expression is too often used in a sense that corresponds neither to the national spirit, nor the needs of the era, nor the maintenance of public order [...] We will seek to maintain ourselves in a just middle ground, equally distant from the excesses of popular power and the abuses of royal power.

This policy, characterized by pragmatic pacifism on the international stage and cautious moderation domestically, aimed to create "a monarchy without royalism, an oligarchy without aristocracy, a progressive state without liberalism." However, it struggled to satisfy both the parti du mouvement (the progressive faction) and the parti de la résistance (the conservative faction).

Albert Boime suggests that the pear's shape derives from a caricature of the juste milieu, inspired by representations of the bourgeoisie. Henry Monnier, who created Monsieur Prudhomme in the same year, portrayed the bourgeois figure in a manner that created a "pear-shaped silhouette." This figure, representing a supporter of Louis-Philippe's regime, evokes themes from a popular song and Chateaubriand's characterization of bourgeois royalty.

Boime argues that the lithographic plate titled Le Juste Milieu, published around 1830, graphically depicted the juste milieu as a hybrid figure, symbolizing the tension between republican principles and royal pretensions. Le Men notes that the figure's appearance, with a necktie tapering into a leek-like shape, further emphasized this contrast. Fabrice Erre suggests that the pear symbol reflects the intersection of the social base, ideology, and sovereign of the July Monarchy. Boime contends that the pear's shape, with its rounded and elongated ends, symbolized the transition between two extremes, embodying the balance sought by the juste milieu.

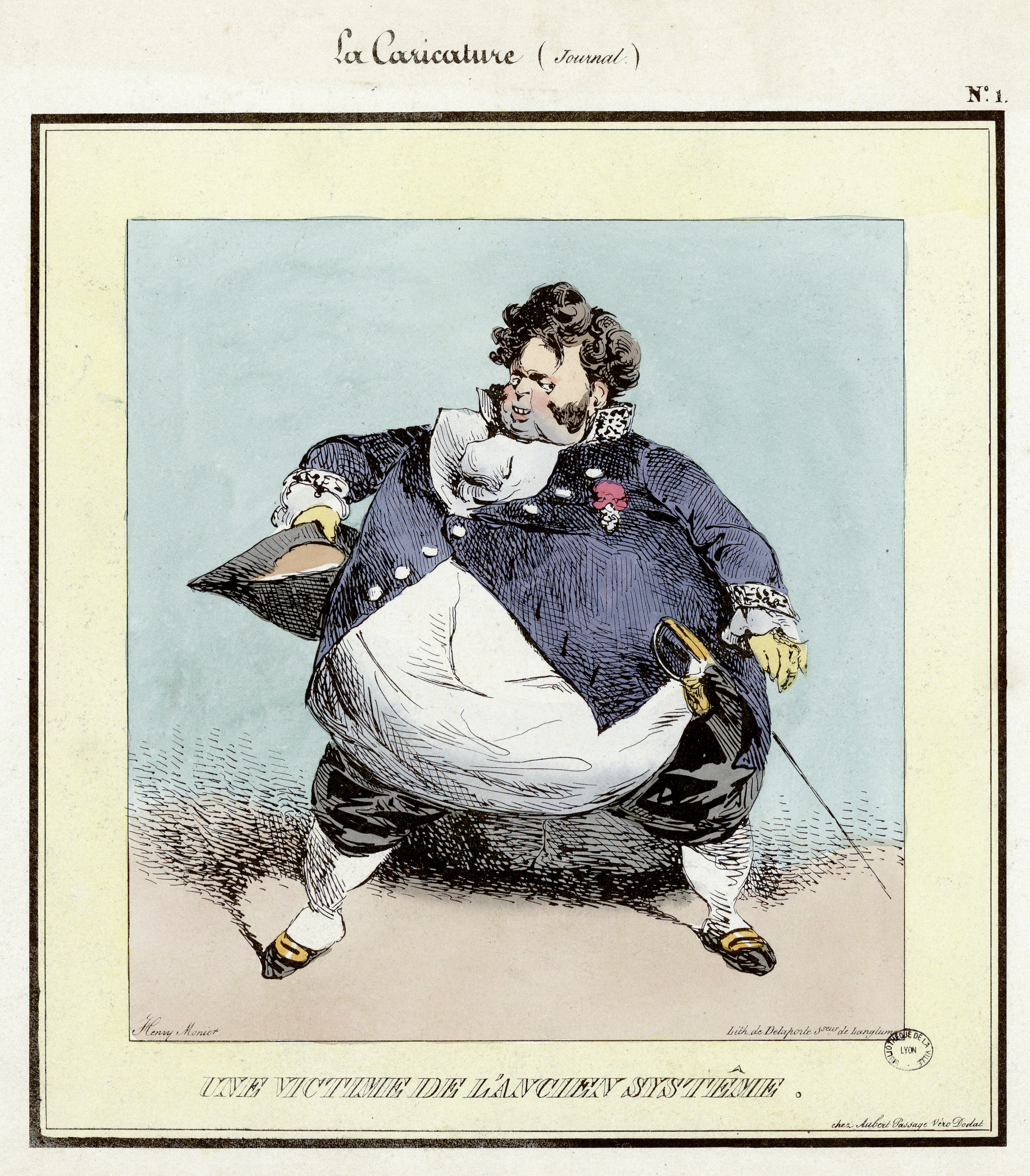
A victim of the old system, Monnier, 1830.

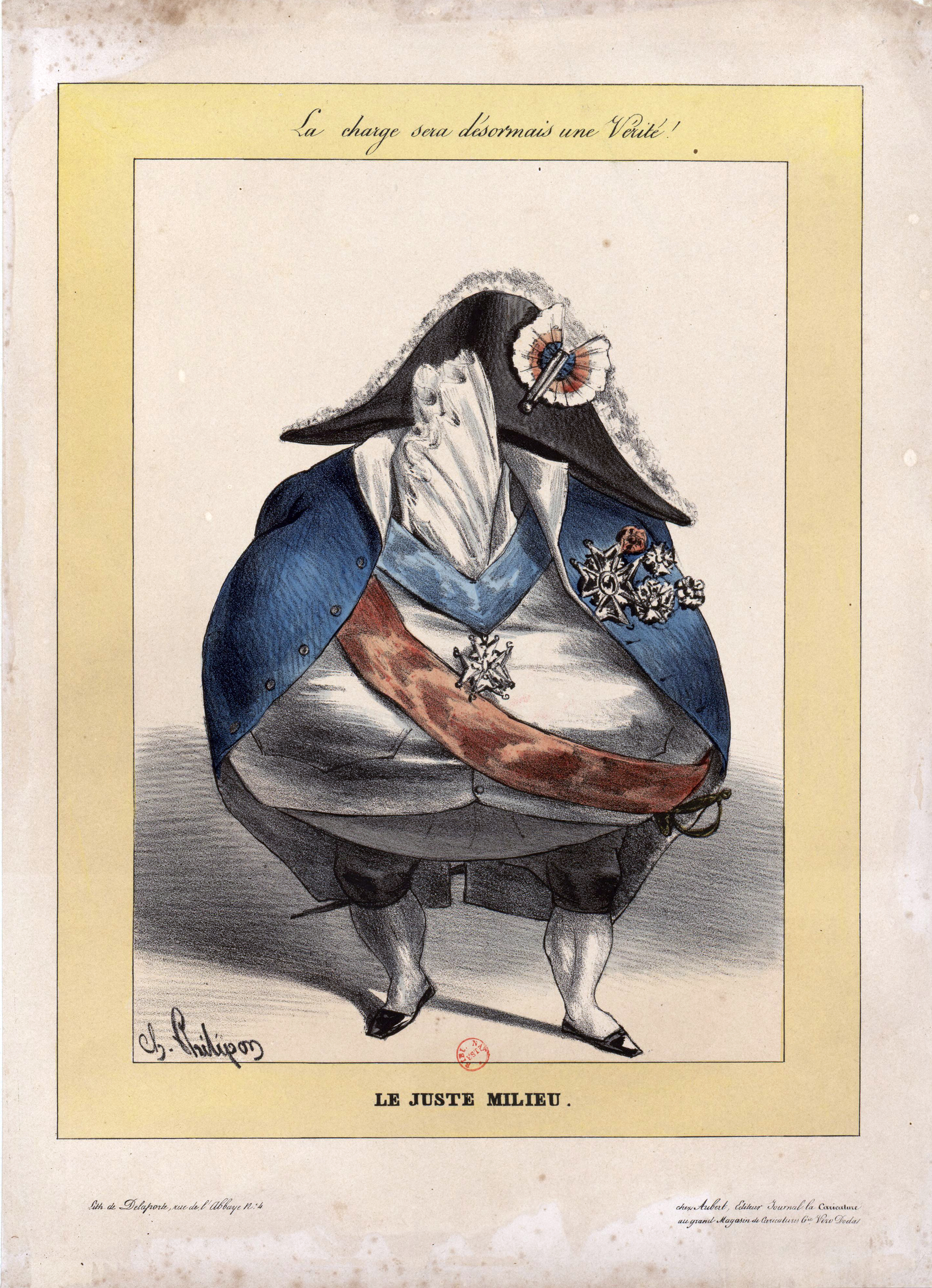
Le Juste Milieu, Philipon, c. 1830.

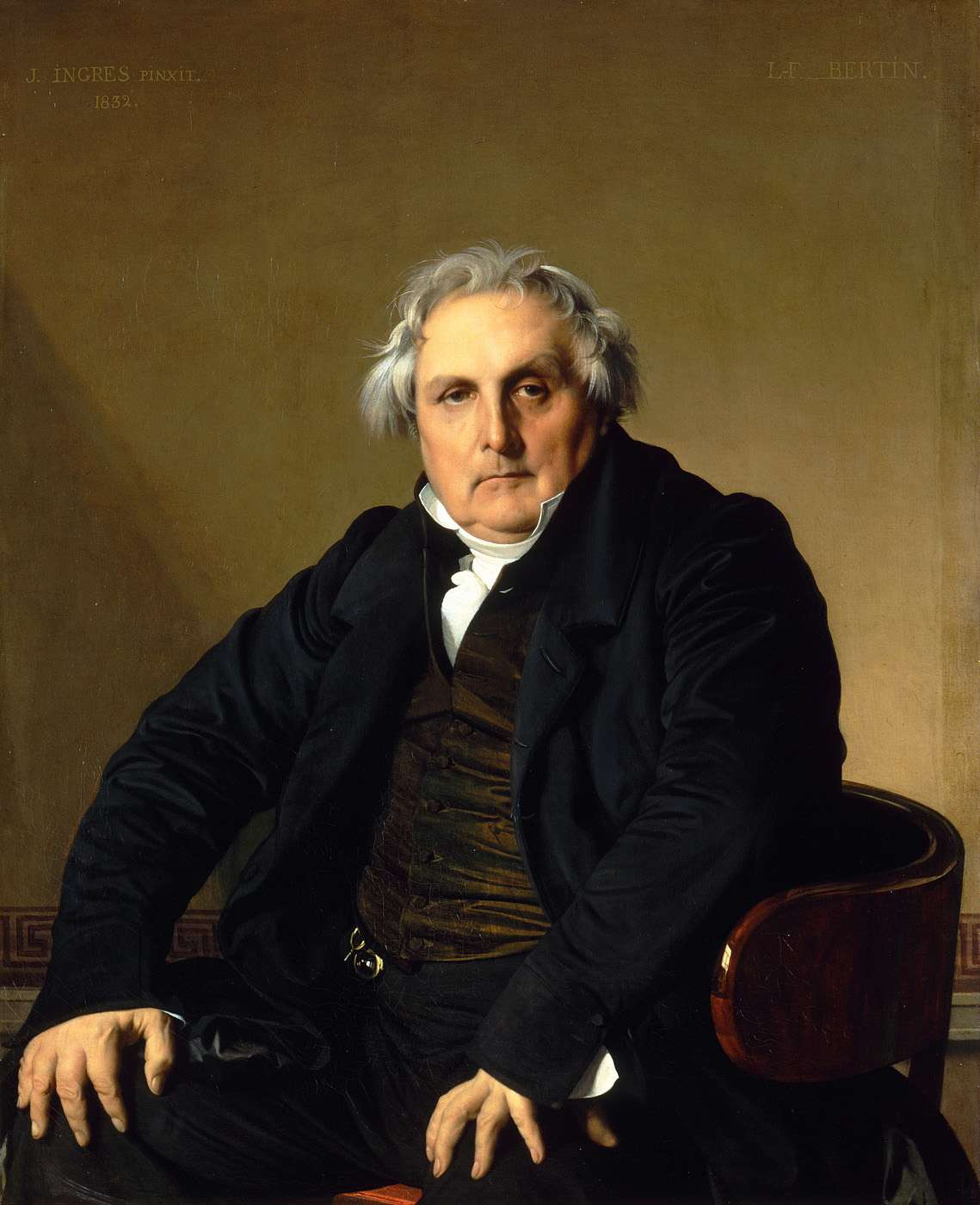
Portrait of Louis-François Bertin. Jean-Auguste-Dominique Ingres, 1832.

Several authors consider Philipon's Juste Milieu to be the prototype of the Poire and compare this caricature to that of the Victime de l'ancien système by Henry Monnier. Albert Boime, for his part, compares Le Juste Milieu to the portrait of Louis-François Bertin by Ingres, which he considers to be the “real-life counterpart” of this caricature.

Additionally, Louis-Philippe's connection with his bourgeois electorate is symbolized by the pear-shaped cotton nightcap the king wears in Naissance du juste milieu, a cap associated with the figure of the grocer.

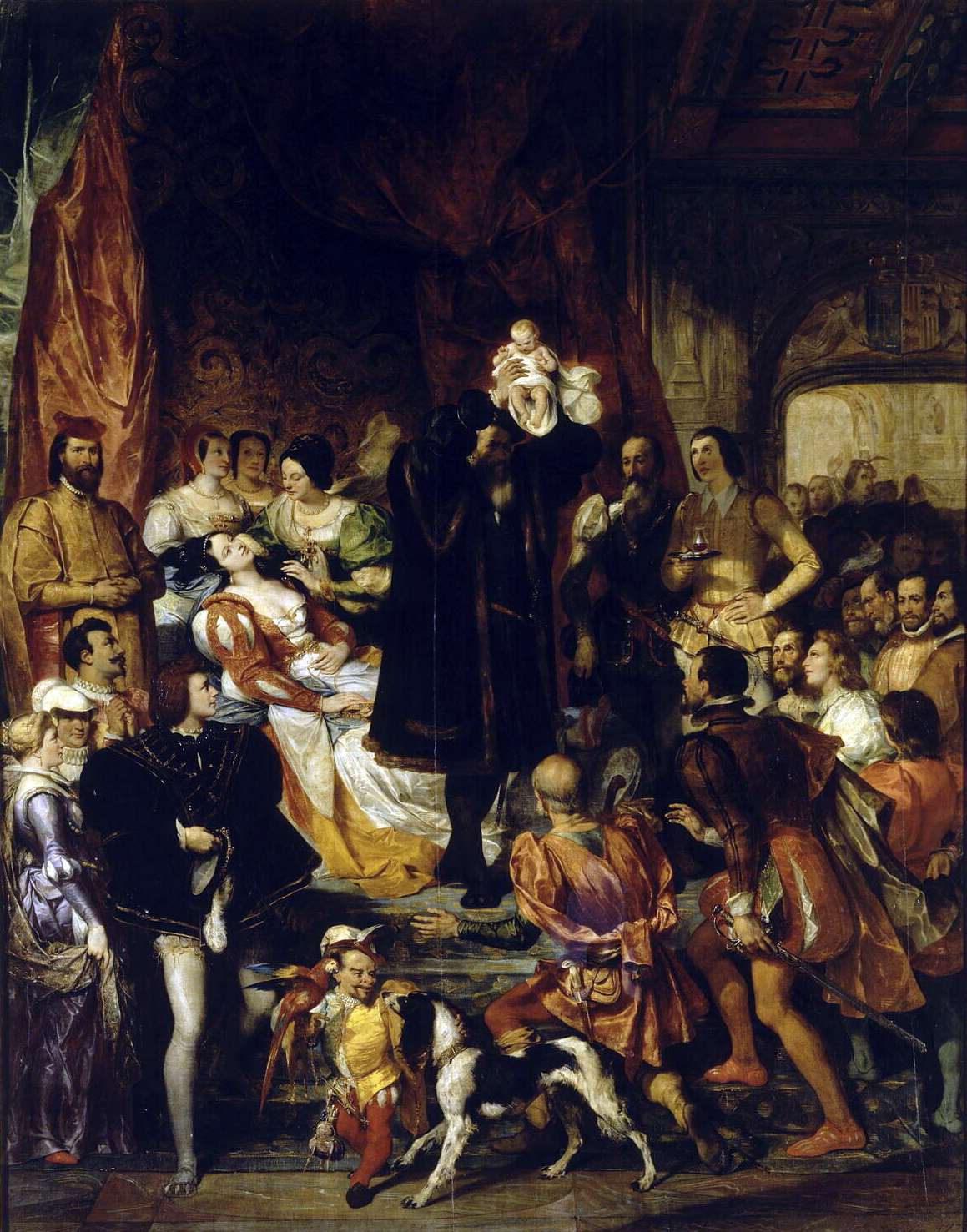
Birth of Henri IV. Eugène Devéria, 1827.

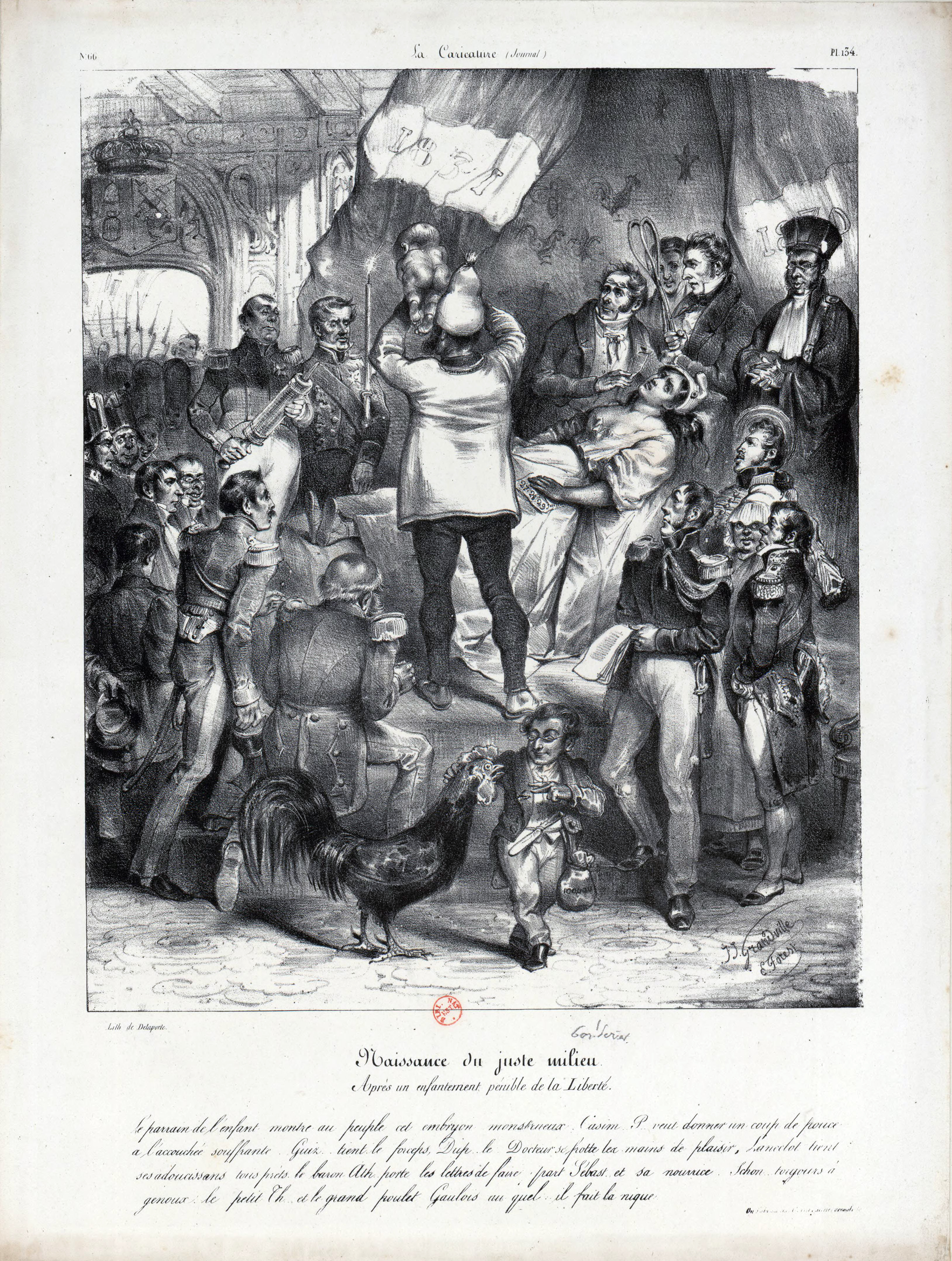
Naissance du juste milieu après un enfantement pénible de la liberté, Grandville and Forest, 1832

The Grandville and Forest caricature parodies the Birth of Henri IV exhibited at the 1827 salon by Eugène Devéria. The covering of the back walls with a tricolor flag suggests that the happy medium is just a disguise for the continuation of the old monarchic values, while the clyster held by Marshal Lobau and the threatening gesture of the dwarf Adolphe Thiers towards the Gallic rooster suggest threats to freedom.

Gradually, the meaning of the pear broadened to represent not only the ideology of the July Monarchy system but the system itself.

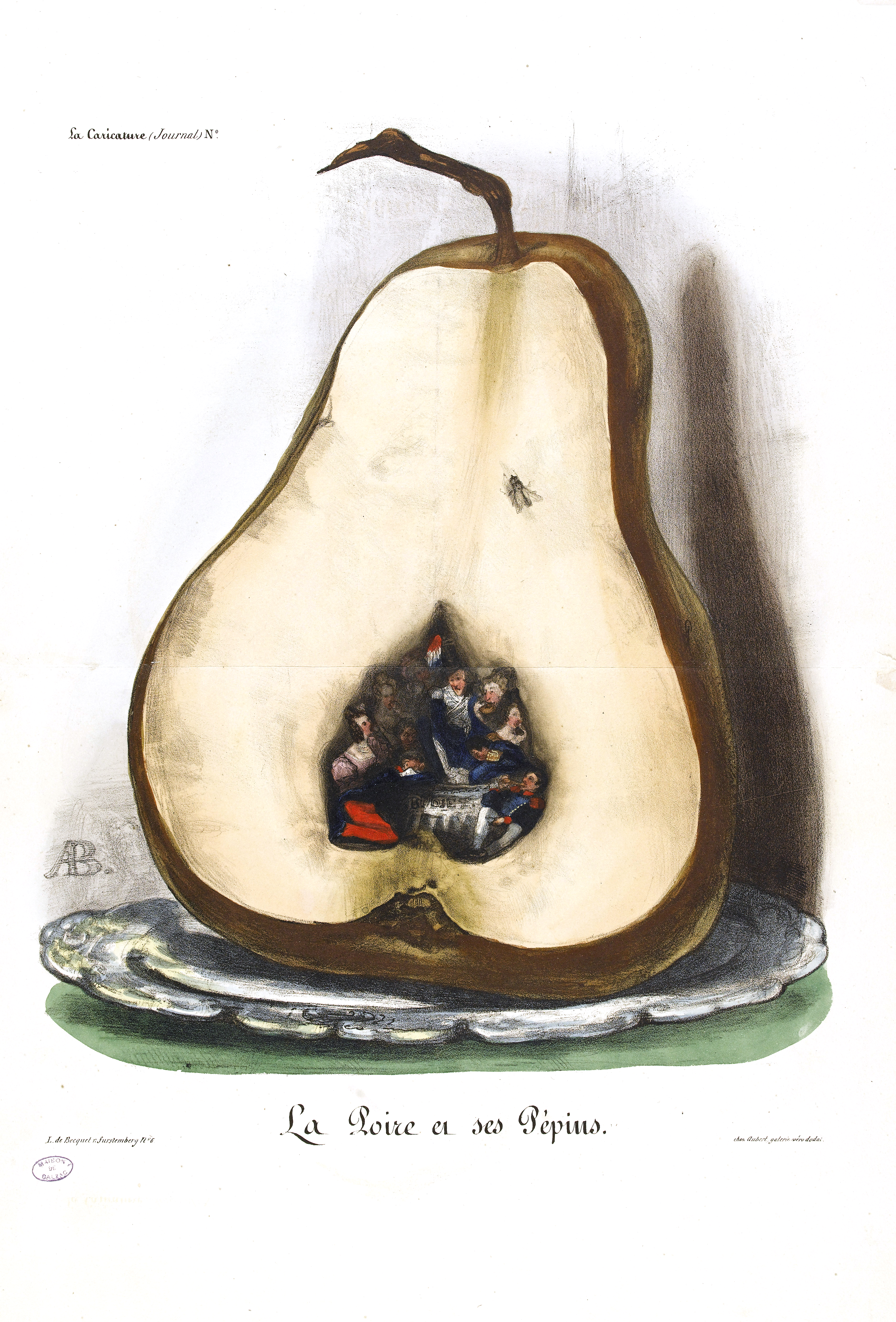
La Poire et ses pépins (The Pear and its Problems). Auguste Bouquet, 1833.

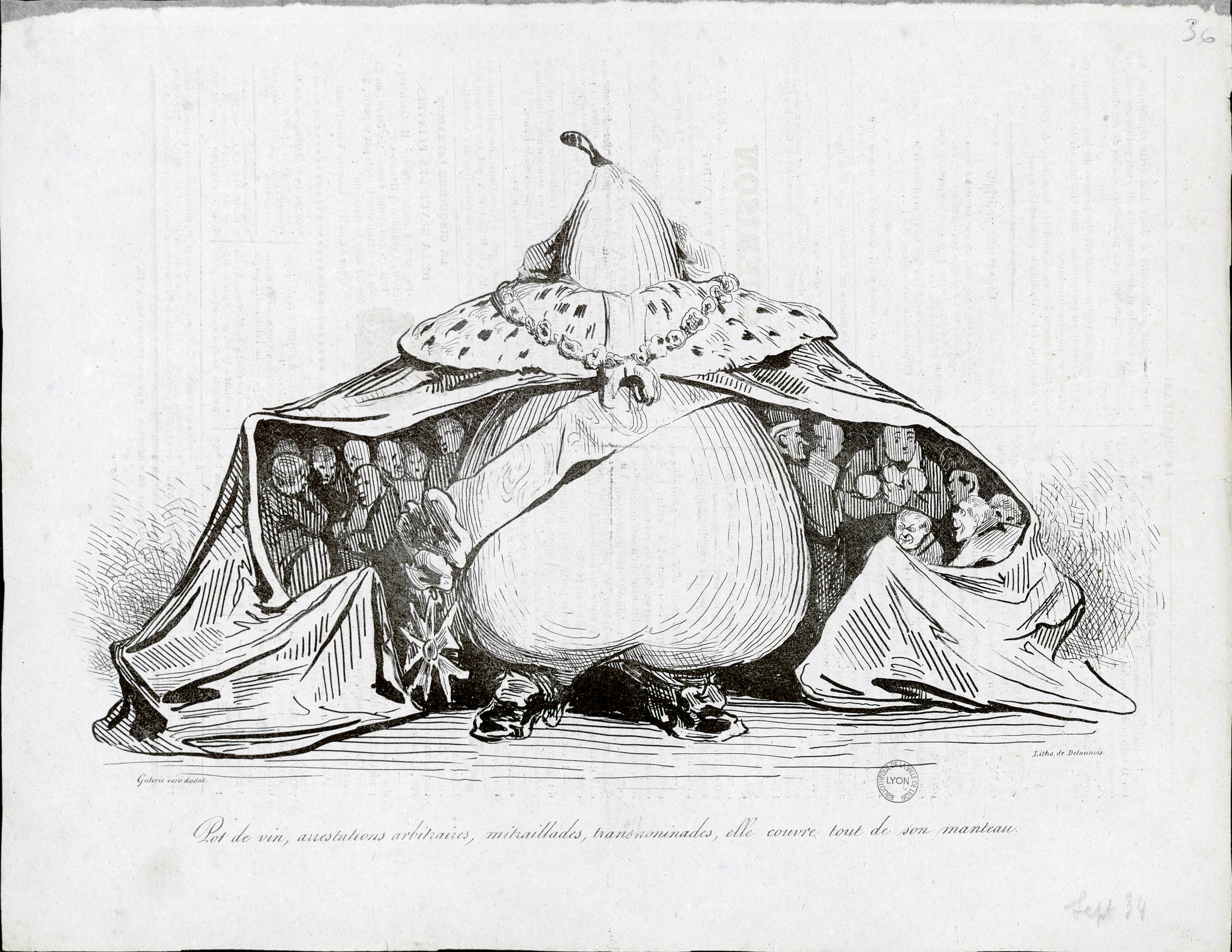
Bribes, arbitrary arrests, shootings, beatings, it covers everything with its cloak, Daumier, 1834

La Poire et ses pépins by Bouquet in 1833 shows the entire royal body, taken in its symbolic dimension, to represent a system from which the pips benefit. Although the cartoon is presented as “clear enough that it is unnecessary to explain it,” it is not clear whether the pips refer to “the royal family huddled around a treasure where the pips should have been” or to members of the government, considered to be profiteers. Bribes, arbitrary arrests, machine-gun fire, transnoninades, it covers everything with its cloak, representing, according to Elise Kenney and John Merriman, one of the most articulated developments of the theme of the Pear: she is fleshy, soft, overripe; the toupee is reduced to a stalk; the generous hips, emphasized by concentric lines, suggest an imposing behind; the royal shoes add a touch of incongruity; her ample cape shelters all the ministers.

=== The pear as a joke ===
The satirical potential of the pear was explored even before Philipon's sketches. An article in Le Figaro on March 9, 1831, stated: “Between the pear and the cheese, the people demand liberty as a middle ground.” After the pear became widely recognized, satire found in this comparison a rich source for humor, which, according to Fabrice Erre, was explored intensively over a short period, allowing it to become a well-established motif. For example, in Le Figaro of January 1832, pears were frequently featured in caricatures.”

Examples of witty remarks from Le Figaro in January 1832:
- January 5, 1832: "No more pears are served on the table of the Juste-Milieu; pears don't eat each other [...] A certain rather soft pear from the Juste-Milieu will never be mistaken for a powder pear."
- January 6, 1832: "Mr. Pepin would gladly divide the pear into four, provided he gets to keep the stem."
- January 7, 1832: "No way to water the pear with Laffitte wine... The doctrinaires have made France swallow a pear of anguish."
- January 8, 1832: "It's wrong to say that the July Revolution was made for plums; it was made for a pear... A hungry people don’t want to save a pear for later thirst."
- January 10, 1832: "It's a sign of delicacy to peel the pear scrupulously... Nothing refreshes better than biting into a pear."
- January 11, 1832: "They'll swallow many snakes before making us digest the pear... The King of the Belgians often dreams of what he might become, between the pear and the cheese."
- January 13, 1832: "It was noticed at Someone's ball that all the ice creams were pear-shaped."
- January 14, 1832: "The pear is becoming an apple of discord."
- January 18, 1832: "Three pear sellers were imprisoned recently; they are accused of distributing and selling caricatures."
- January 19, 1832: "A pear costs millions today; that's why the compote is hard to digest."
- January 20, 1832: "If Pepin were king of the French today, he'd ban the pear as a political fruit... Adam was lost for an apple; July is lost for a pear... Today, pears have pits [...] The Minister of Fine Arts suggested to the Academy that the King would be pleased to see a eulogy of the pear as a competition topic... The pear of the Tuileries has nothing to envy from the apples of the Hesperides."
- January 24, 1832: "Another liberty tree on which they want to graft a pear."

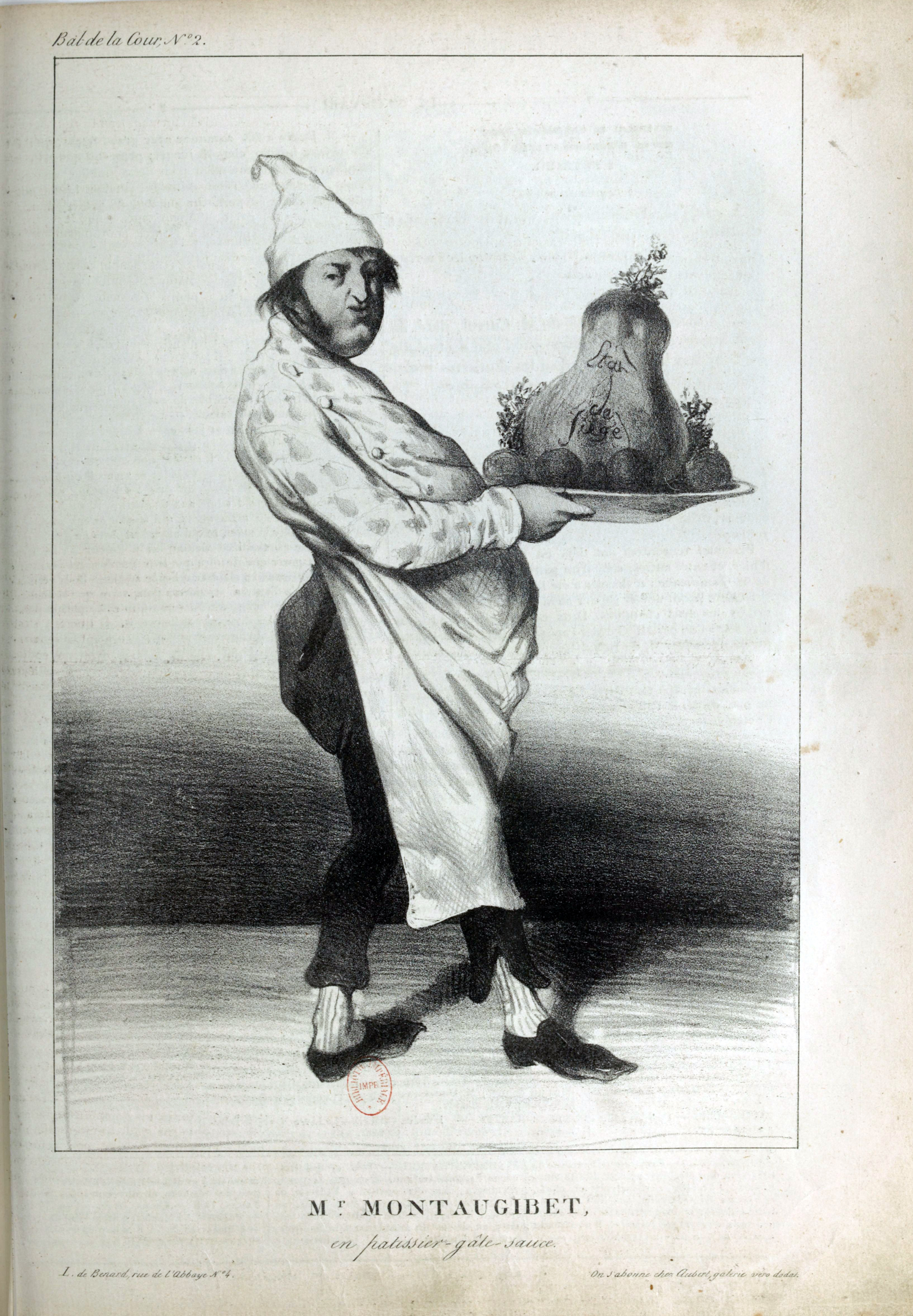
Mr. Montaugibet as a pastry chef. Daumier, 1832.

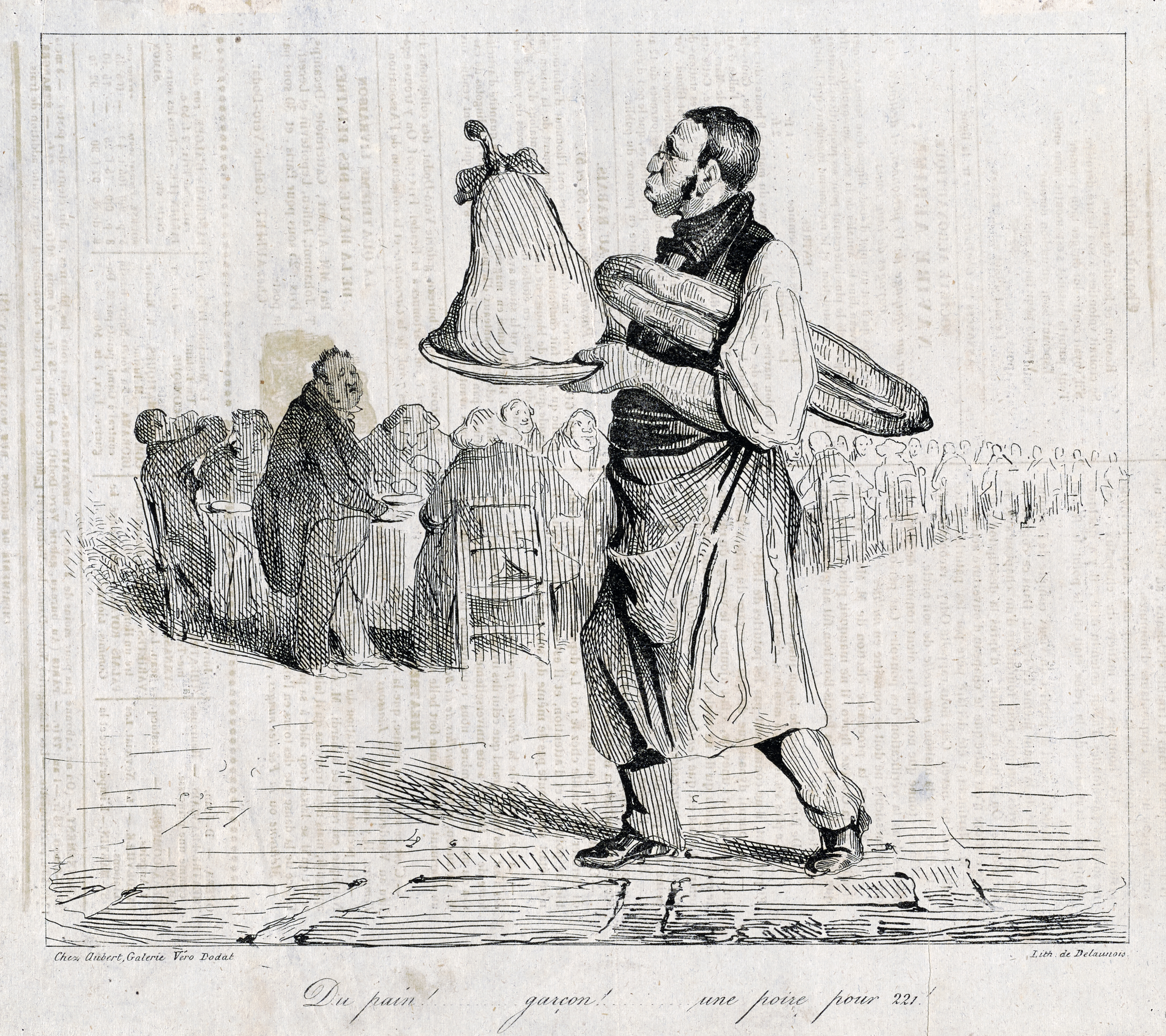
Some bread! Waiter! A pear for 221. Daumier, 1834.

Mr Montaugibet, the pastry chef extraordinaire, shows the minister Camille de Montalivet as a bad cook, with a pear-shaped face, wearing a pear-shaped cap and a shirt decorated with pears, who serves a pear on which is written “état de siège” (state of siege) in reference to the riots of June 1832, garnished with a sauce of prunes (in reference to Victor Prunelle, mayor of Lyon) and parsley (in reference to Jean-Charles Persil, attorney general). The image also lends itself to other interpretations: an invitation to devour the fruit, an assimilation of the offer of fruit to that of sexual favors, or a parallel with Philipon as a master of the art of preparing the Poire. In the same vein, Du pain! Garçon! Une poire pour 221 refers to the minister Charles Dupin and the 221 deputies of the Chamber, seated in the background, with whom the king is standing.

This visual joke was often paired with captions and commentary in periodicals such as La Caricature and Le Charivari, where graphic creativity was matched by linguistic inventiveness. For instance, Philipon's 1832 proposal for an “expiation pear” monument led to legal consequences. He defended himself by stating it was merely an idea for "incitement to marmalade.” Similarly, Grandville's 1833 Élévation de la poire prompted discussions about the "adoripear" cult.

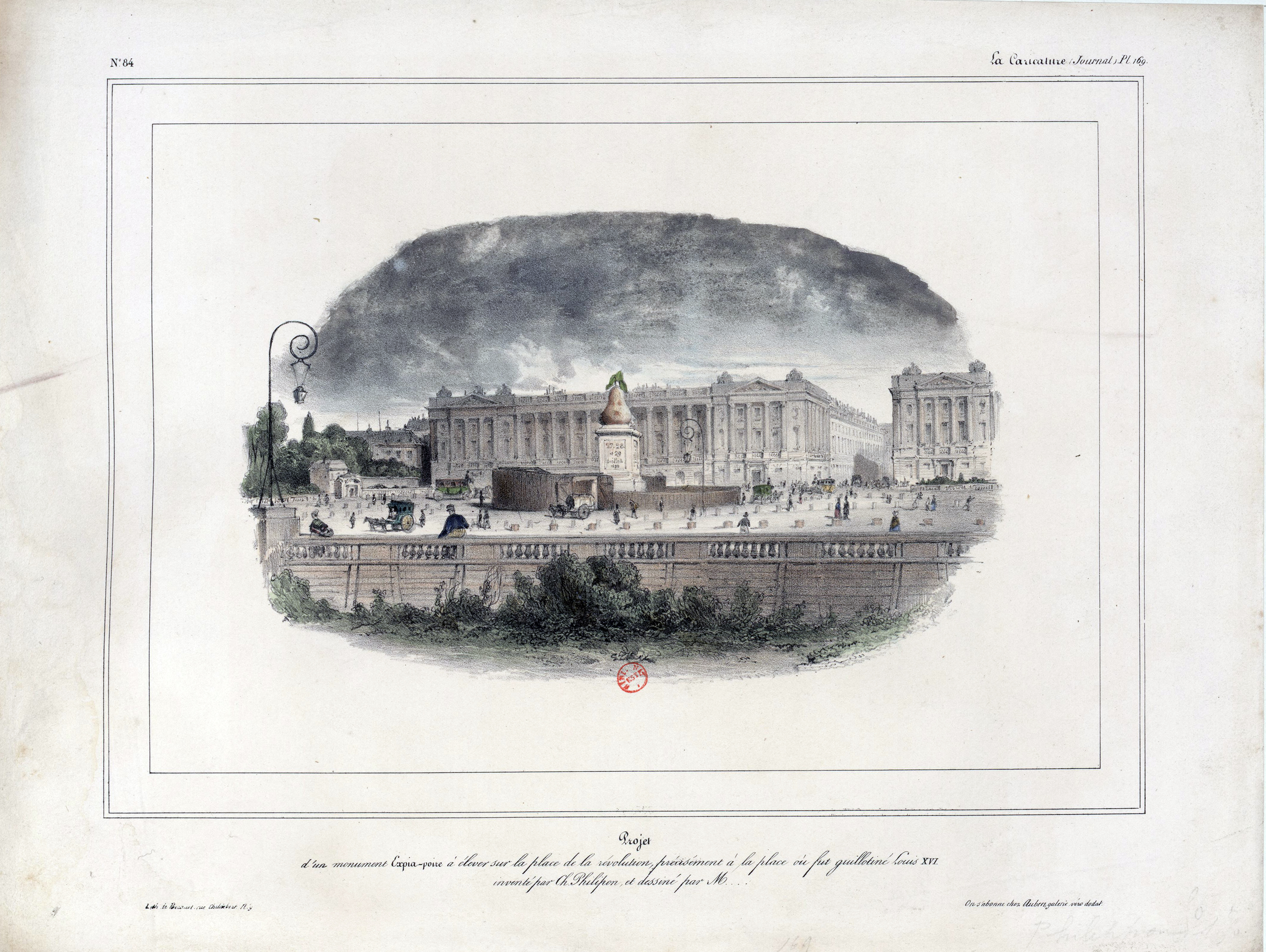
Project for an Expia-poire monument. Philipon, 1832

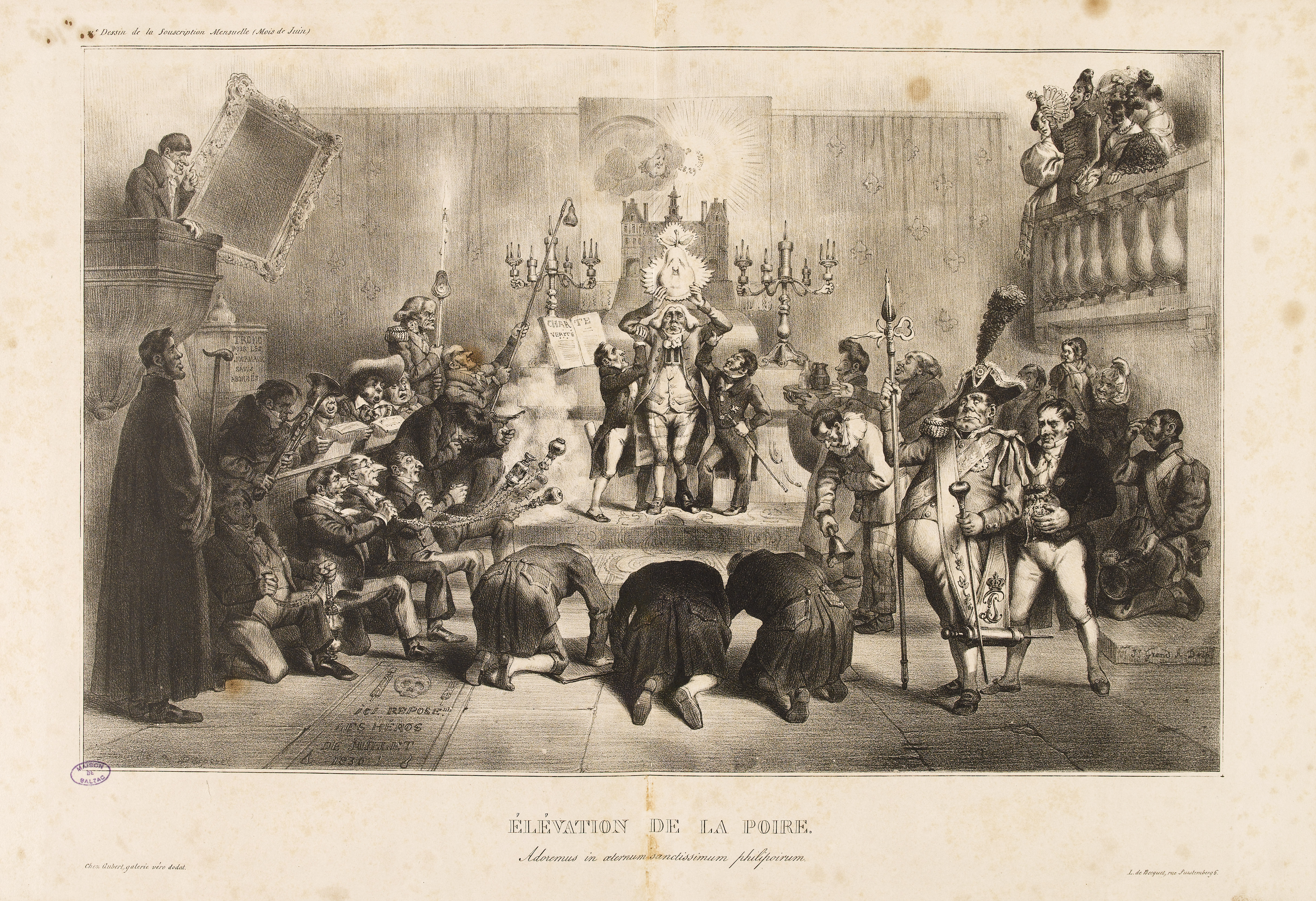
Elevation of the pear. Grandville, 1833.

The “expiation pear” monument project is described by Philipon as that of a “statue in the happy medium”: "A colossal pear on a very simple, very bourgeois pedestal; and on this pedestal the following bill engraved in letters of blood 27 [+] 28 [+] 29 [(i.e. the Three Glorious Days)] [=] 00 [...] This monument will be erected on the Place de la Révolution, not to establish the slightest connection, but to remind everyone that popular uprisings sometimes have a result other than zero, and that it would be imprudent to start calculating again like they did for the pedestal.” As for the “adoripory” cult, his commentary states that it “dates back to the year 1830 of the Christian era, it originated during the reign of Louis-Philippe, the first and last of the name, known as the Presque-Téméraire, and son of Philippe-Égalité the regicide [...] His god was a golden calf represented by a silver pear [...] The pope officiates, he is assisted by two ministers of his religion, named Thi... and Guiz...; the altar is adorned with hydraulic candles, reminiscent of one of the miracles of the dogma, the transformation of an army marshal into an apothecary; the mass is served by the notable figures of the cloth.”

The Physiologie de la poire, published in 1832 by Sébastien-Benoît Peytel under the pseudonym “Louis Benoît jardinier”, was a 270-page work that presented political commentary through the metaphor of the pear. Peytel's work, while eccentric, offered satirical commentary on Louis-Philippe, his family, and the political regime of the July Monarchy. In the preface, Peytel compared the scope of the work to that of serious scientific publications:

The editors of this important collection are evidently great naturalists. They concerned themselves with the cultivation of the pear tree and the physiological history of the pear long before us. They consistently accompanied their text with black or colored plates, all demonstrative, expressive, and explanatory.

Peytel used the pear as a metaphor for the king, creating a discourse that appeared detached from direct political reference but still critiqued the regime. He humorously extended the physiognomic approach to its limits, suggesting that the head and the belly were interconnected, representing the whole body in a symbolic manner.

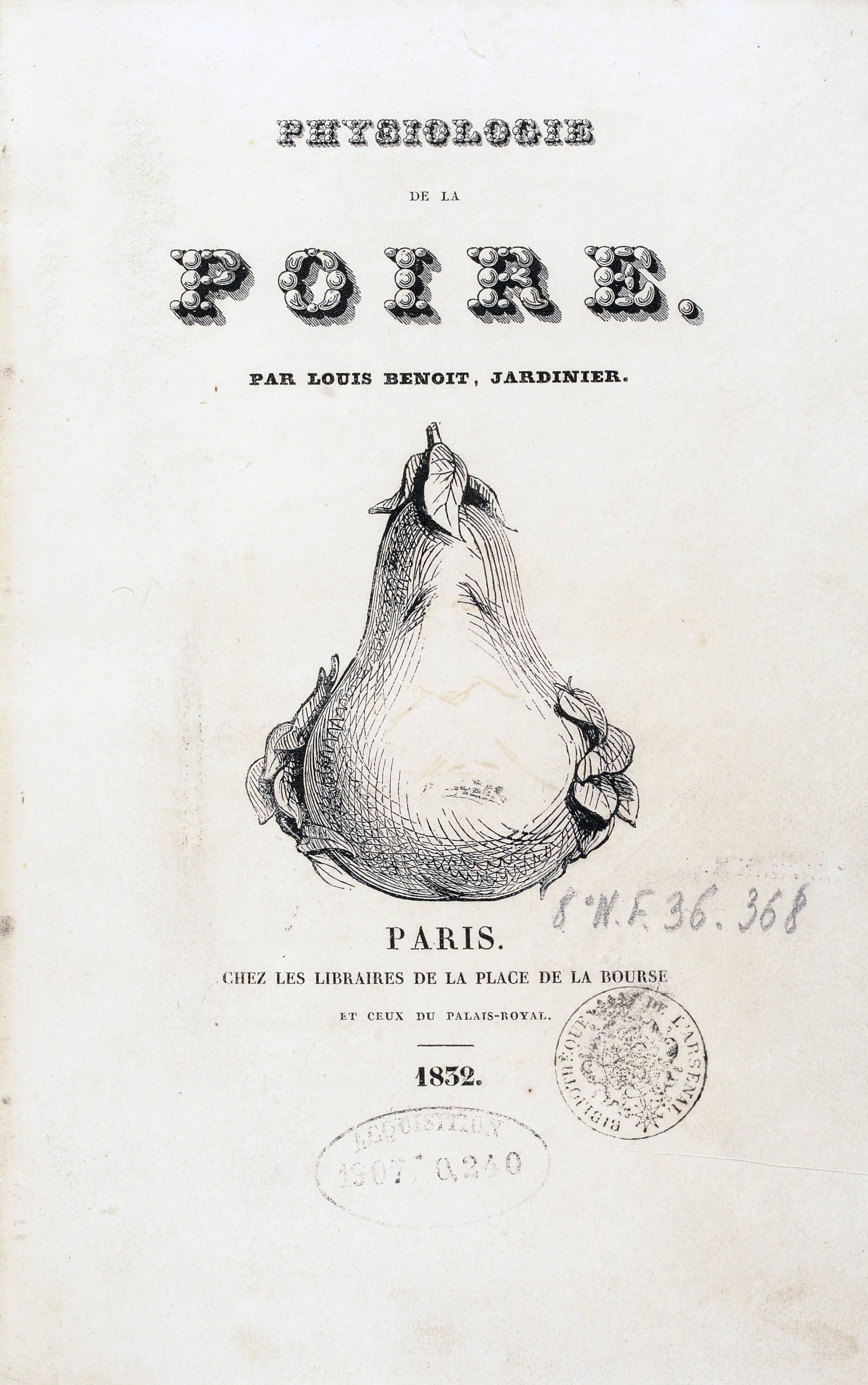
Title page, vignette by Grandville, 1832.

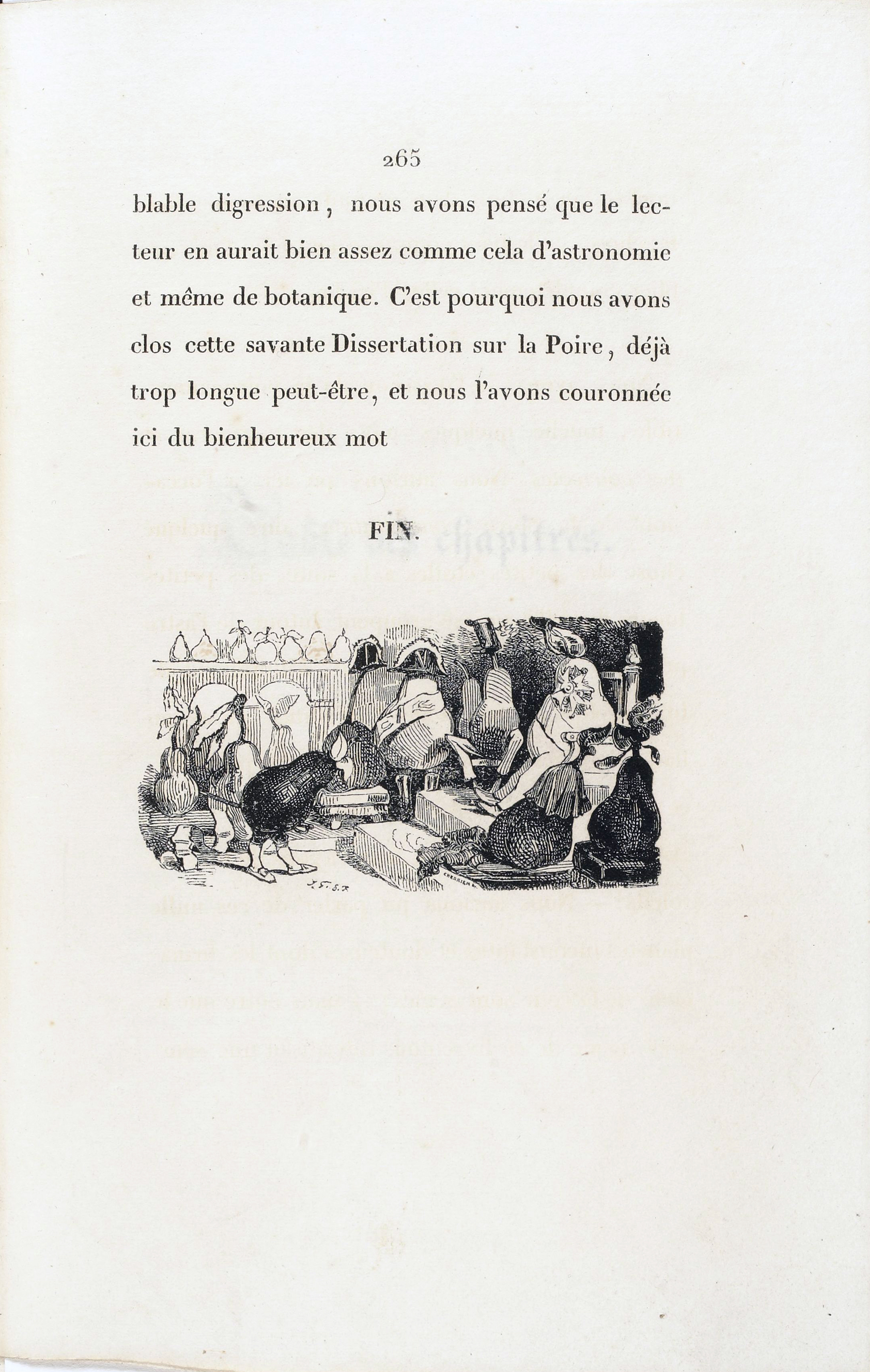
Last page, vignette by Grandville, 1832.

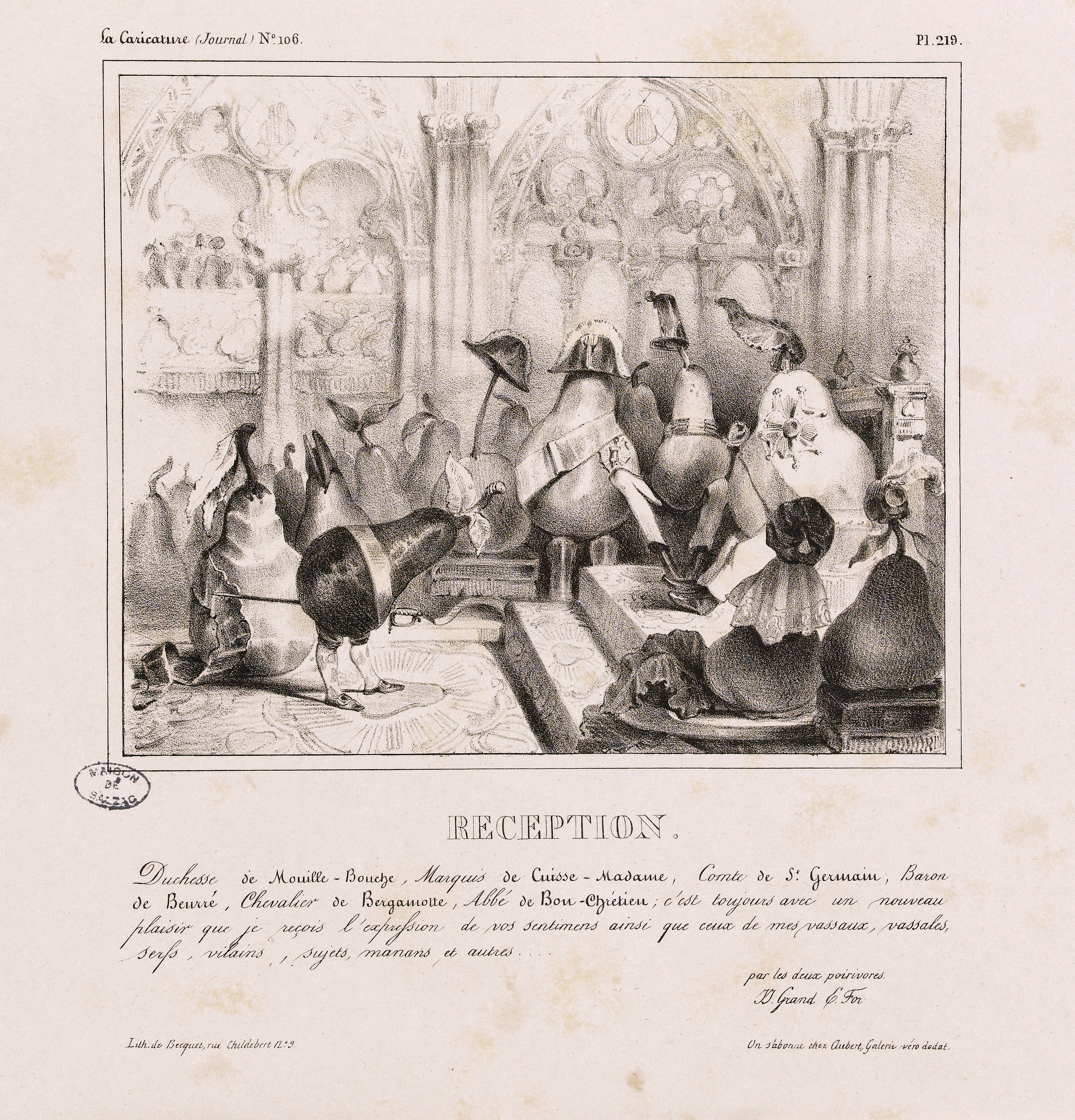
Reception by the two pear-eaters. Grandville, 1832.

The title page and the last page of Physiologie de la poire are decorated with vignettes drawn by Grandville and woodcut by Cherrier. The second reproduces, in a reduced format, Réception par les deux poirivores (Reception by the two pear-eaters), a lithograph by Grandville and Forest published at around the same time, in November 1832, in La Caricature, with the following commentary: “This reception is a dream, a pear-shaped nightmare [...] Imagine the pear supreme receiving all the varieties of the species. To its right, I see [...] the pear to swallow waddling awkwardly next to the big sweet Martini. To the left of the main fruit, I see [...] the Naples pear. I used to see the pear of love, but it is no longer there."

As Nathalie Preiss observes, the pear motif in caricature not only serves as a symbol of Louis-Philippe but also invites reflection on his role in political satire.

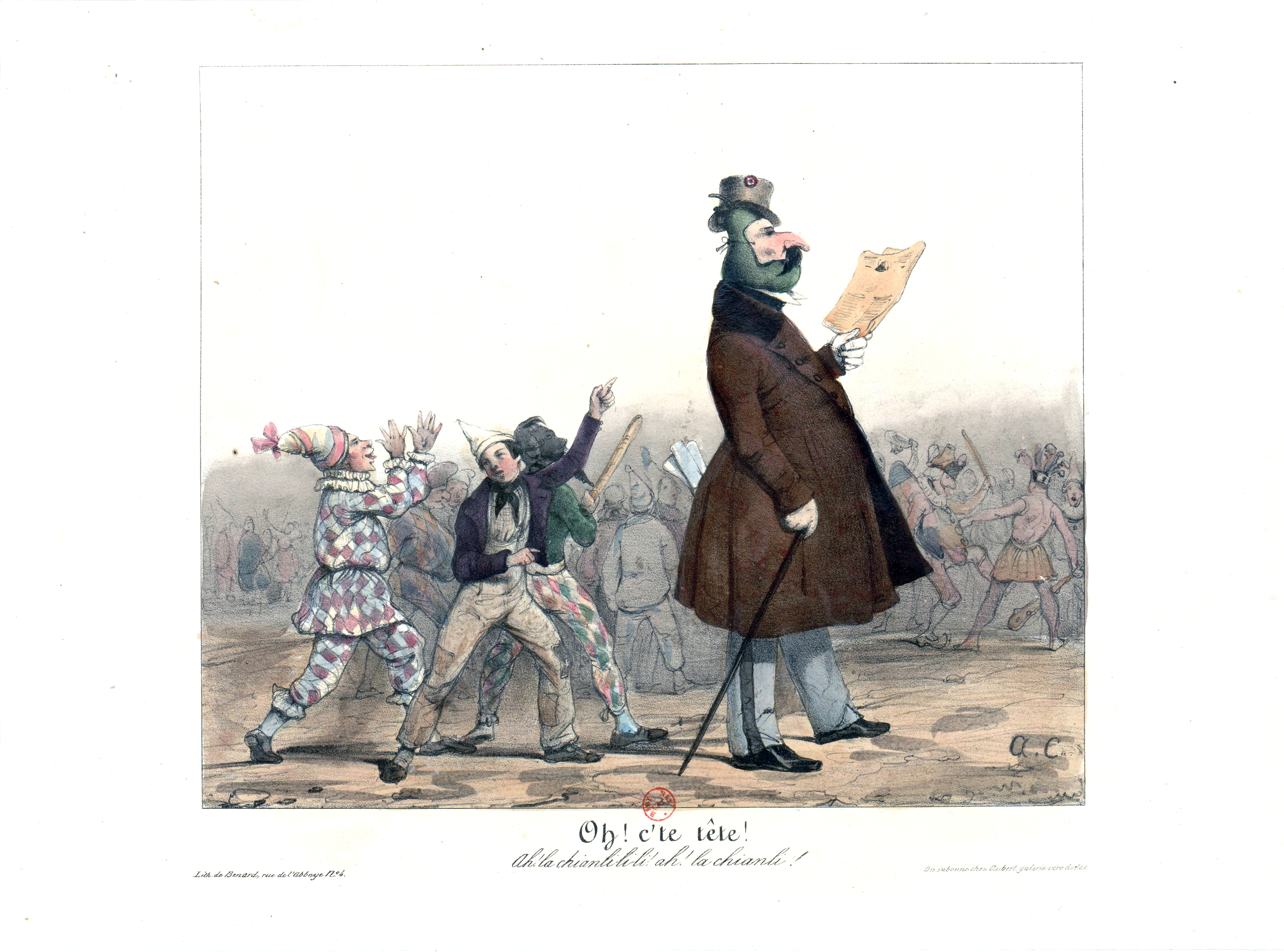
Oh c'te tête. Alexandre Casati, 1833.

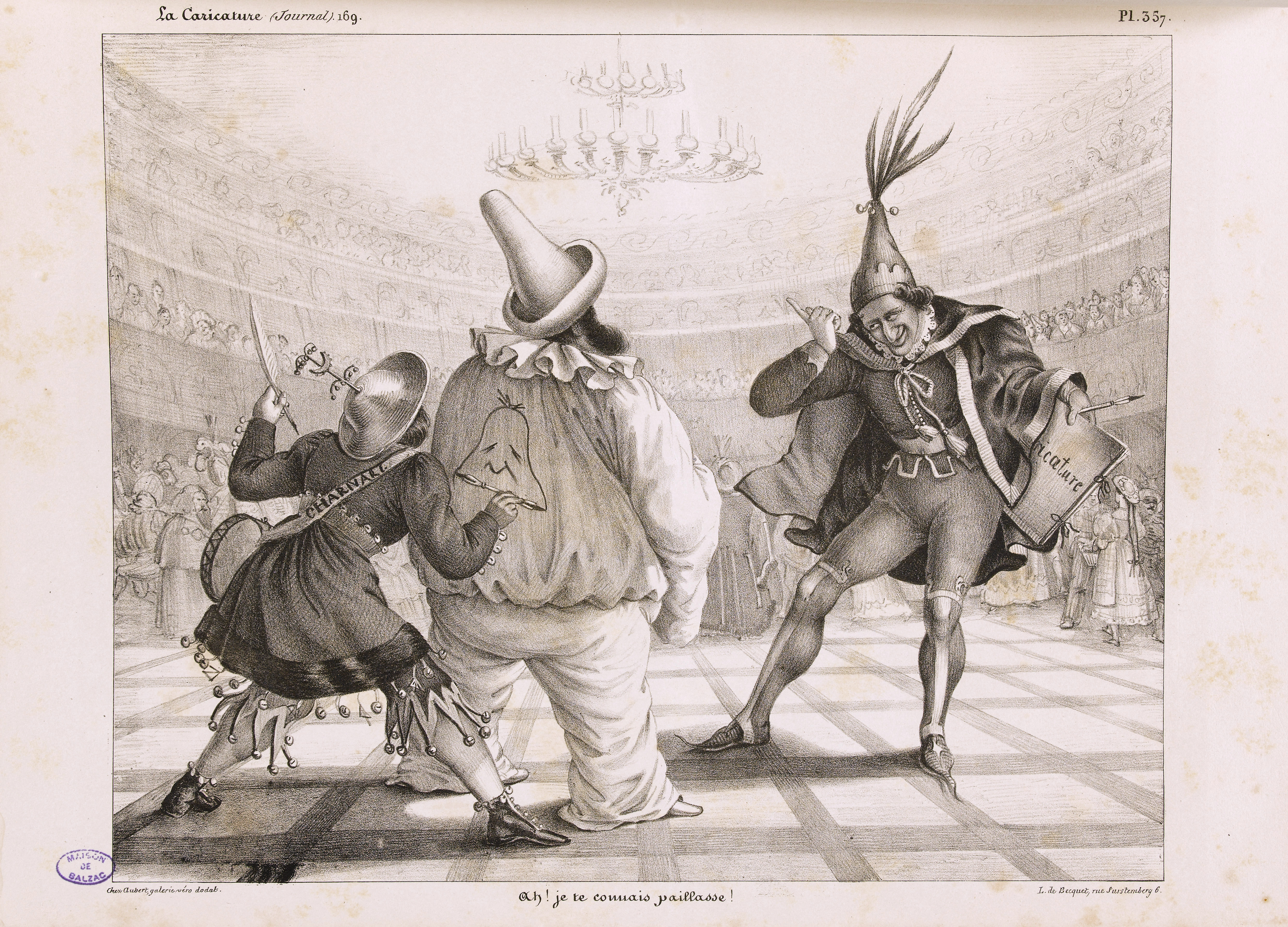
Ah je te connais Paillasse. De Koenig, 1834.

In Oh c'te tête, the truth comes out from the mouths of children who recognize the Poire under a mask that could be that of one of the ministers caricatured by Daumier in Masques de 1831. In Ah je te connais Paillasse, the king-pear is represented as Paillasse, a character associated with farce, by Philipon, himself disguised as a fool, while Louis Desnoyers traces the sign of recognition of the Poire on his back.

In the 19th century, jokes often functioned as a means of commentary, using the shift from "lie-truth" to "full-empty" as a way to explore political ideas. Preiss explains that the political joker, in this context, can be seen as someone who displays an absence rather than concealing a presence, embodied by the pear image.

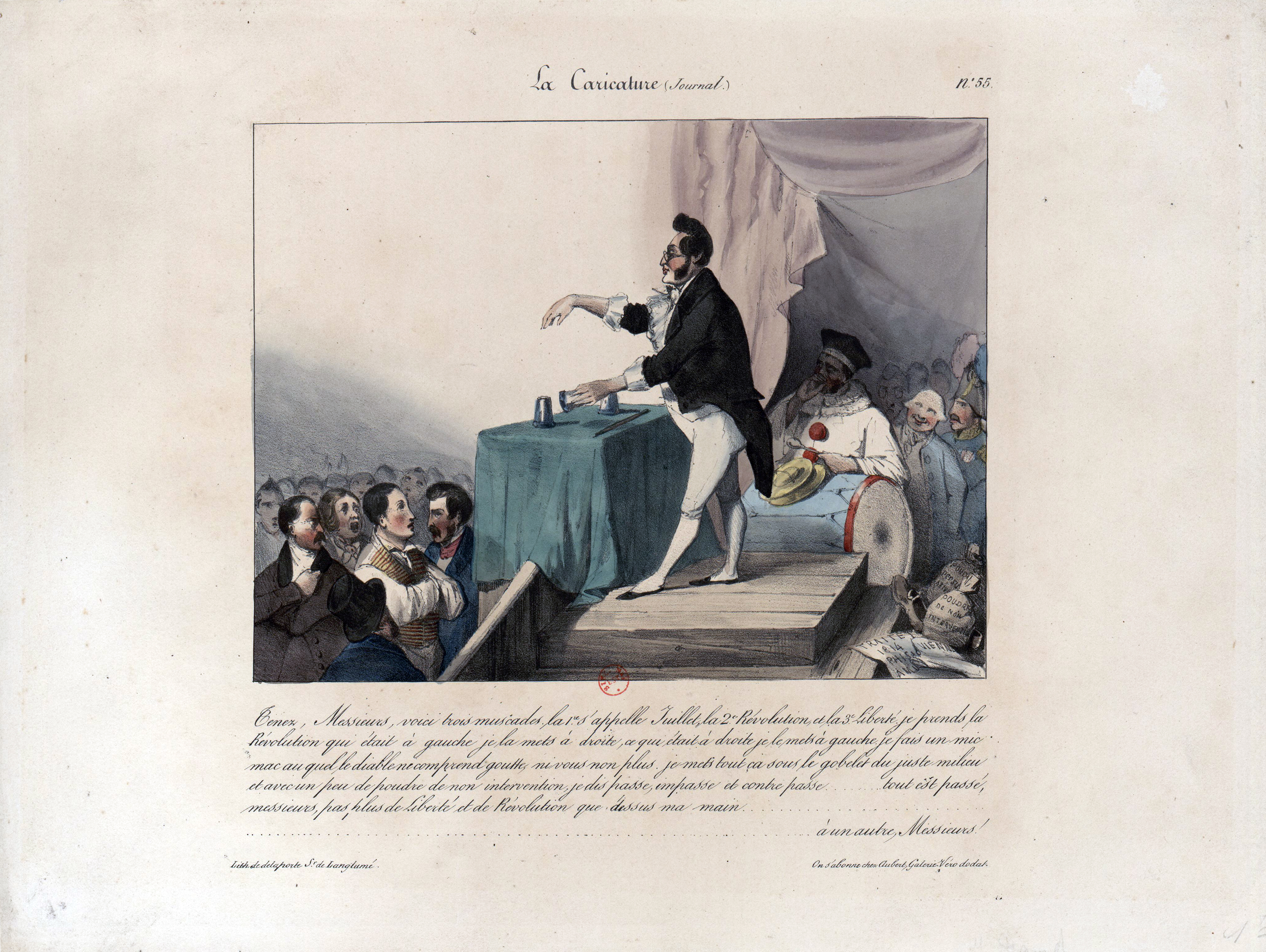
The Conjurer. Jules David, 1831.

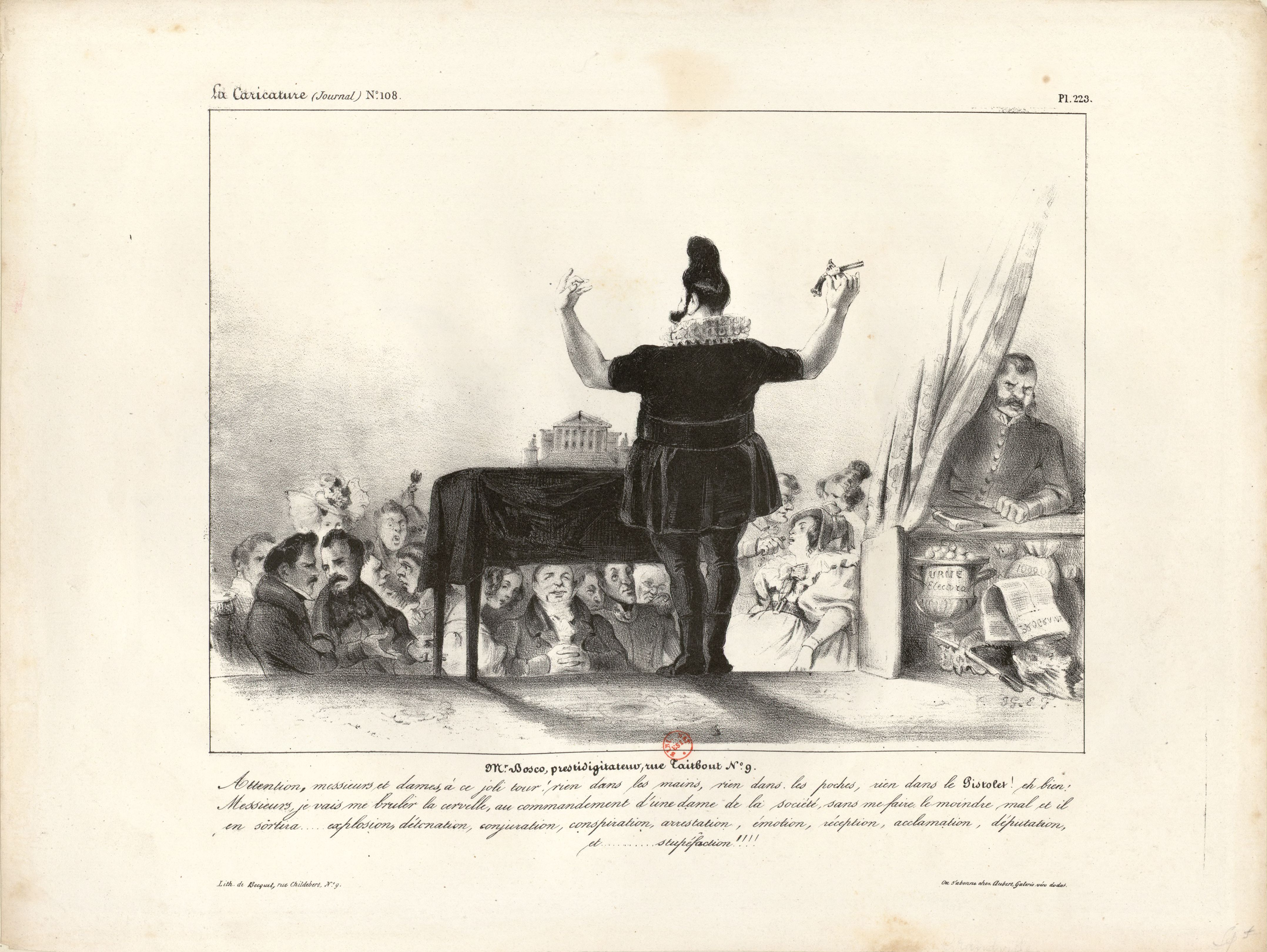
Mr. Bosco the Magician. Grandville, 1832.

Through the figures of sleight of hand and concealment, the caricatures represent what Jean-Eugène Robert-Houdin would theorize a few years later as illusionism, "the wandering of the mind" and "the diversion of attention".

Ségolène Le Men suggests that the pear's shape, characterized by its "approximately spherical" form, contributes to the visual metaphor of "swelling" or "hollow inflation", as seen in works like Bulles de savon. Preiss further interprets this imagery, explaining that the pear represents the transition from falsehood to truth and critiques the nature of political discourse that lacks substance.

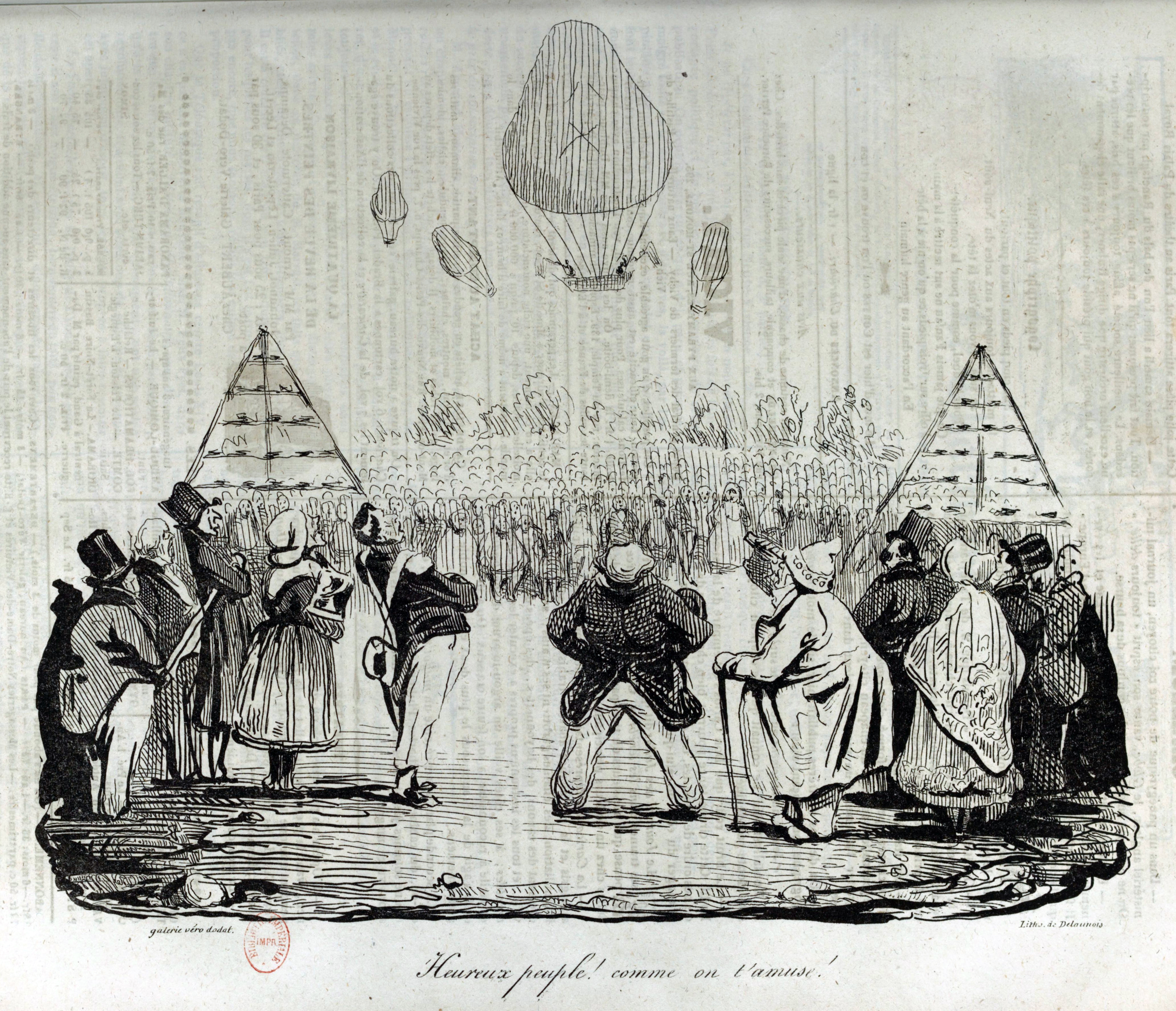
Happy people! How we amuse you, Daumier, 1834

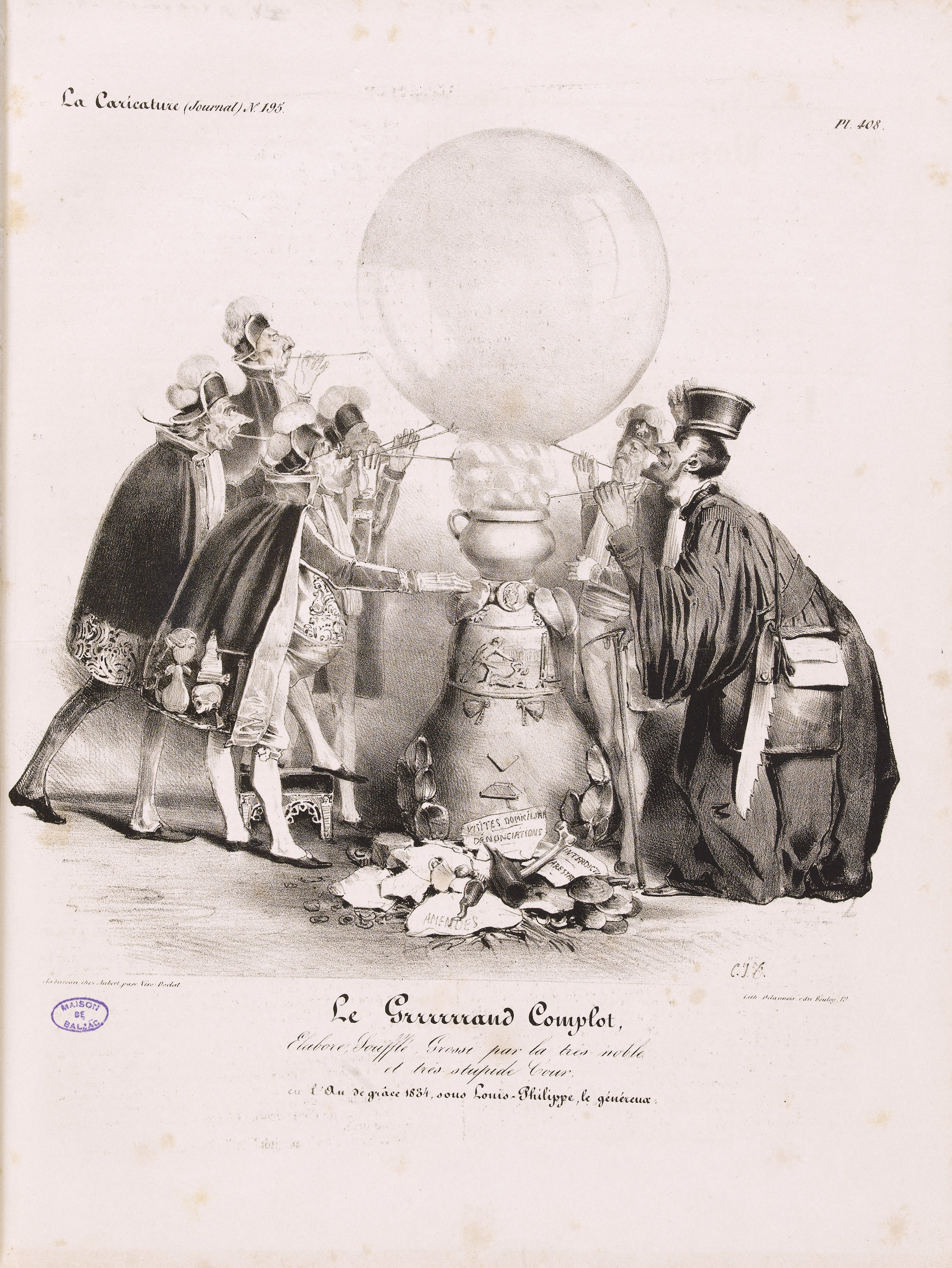
The Grrrrrrand Conspiracy. Traviès, 1834.

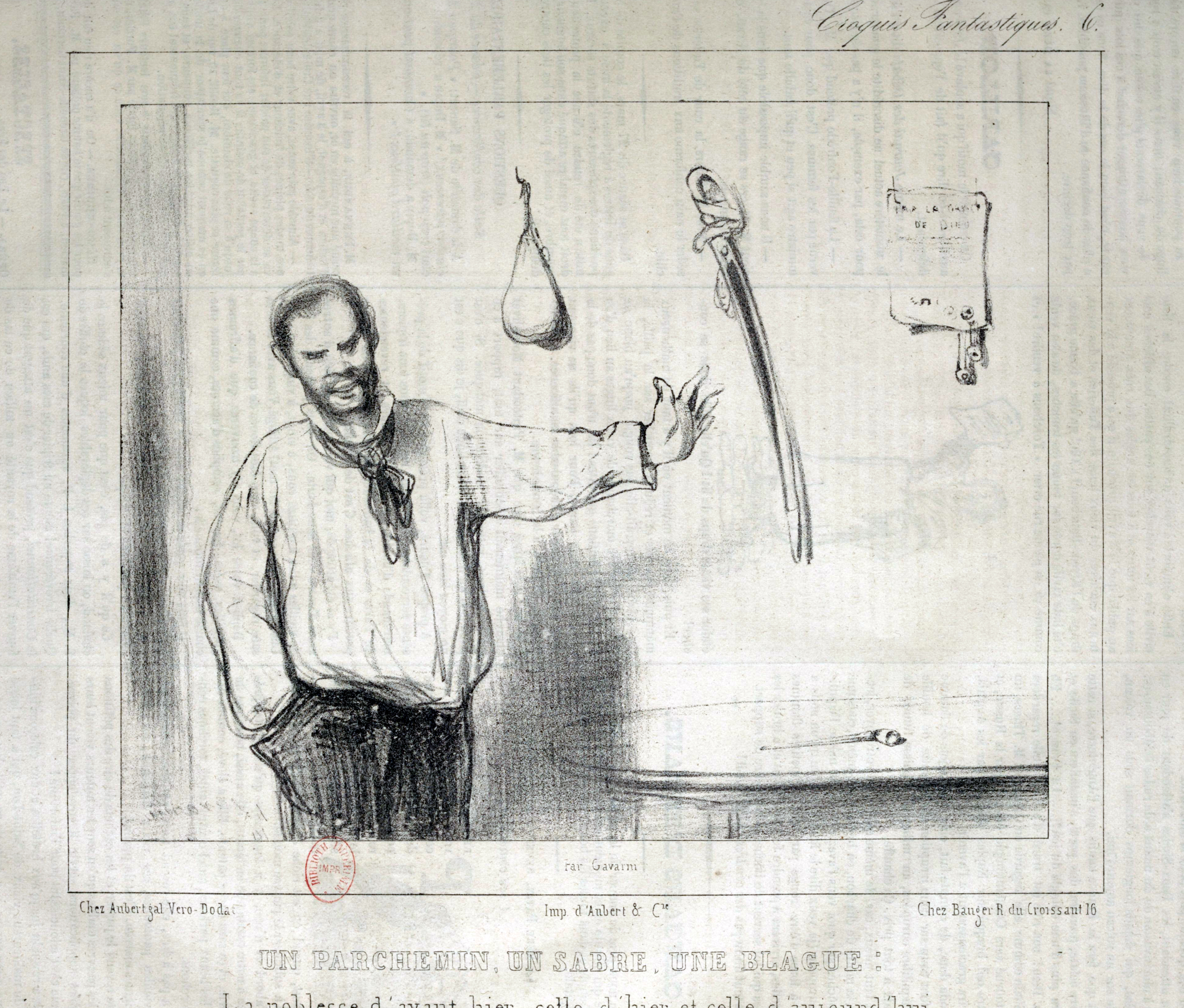
A parchment, a sword, a joke. Paul Gavarni, 1840.

Although produced in the particular context of the government's allegations of republican conspiracy in 1834, the caricatures of Daumier and Traviès refer to Philipon's Soap Bubbles of 1831 and consequently to the joking nature of the July Monarchy, compared to the Ancien Régime and the Empire in Gavarni's caricature.

Ultimately, the pear symbol becomes a tool for questioning the legitimacy and stability of the July Monarchy. The caricature's emphasis on the pear as both a physical and symbolic representation underscores the way in which political power was perceived and critiqued, particularly in terms of its perceived fragility and contradictions.

== Development of the pear ==
=== Proliferation ===
The pear motif was primarily featured in La Caricature and Le Charivari, two periodicals with relatively limited circulation. The former had fewer than a thousand subscribers, while the latter had fewer than three thousand, with most readers being affluent collectors. Over time, the motif spread from the "bourgeois public sphere" to the "plebeian public sphere", particularly through its appearance in various forms of popular media such as newspaper articles, short plays, and lithographed prints. These prints were sold separately and displayed in the windows of Maison Aubert, where crowds would gather to view them.

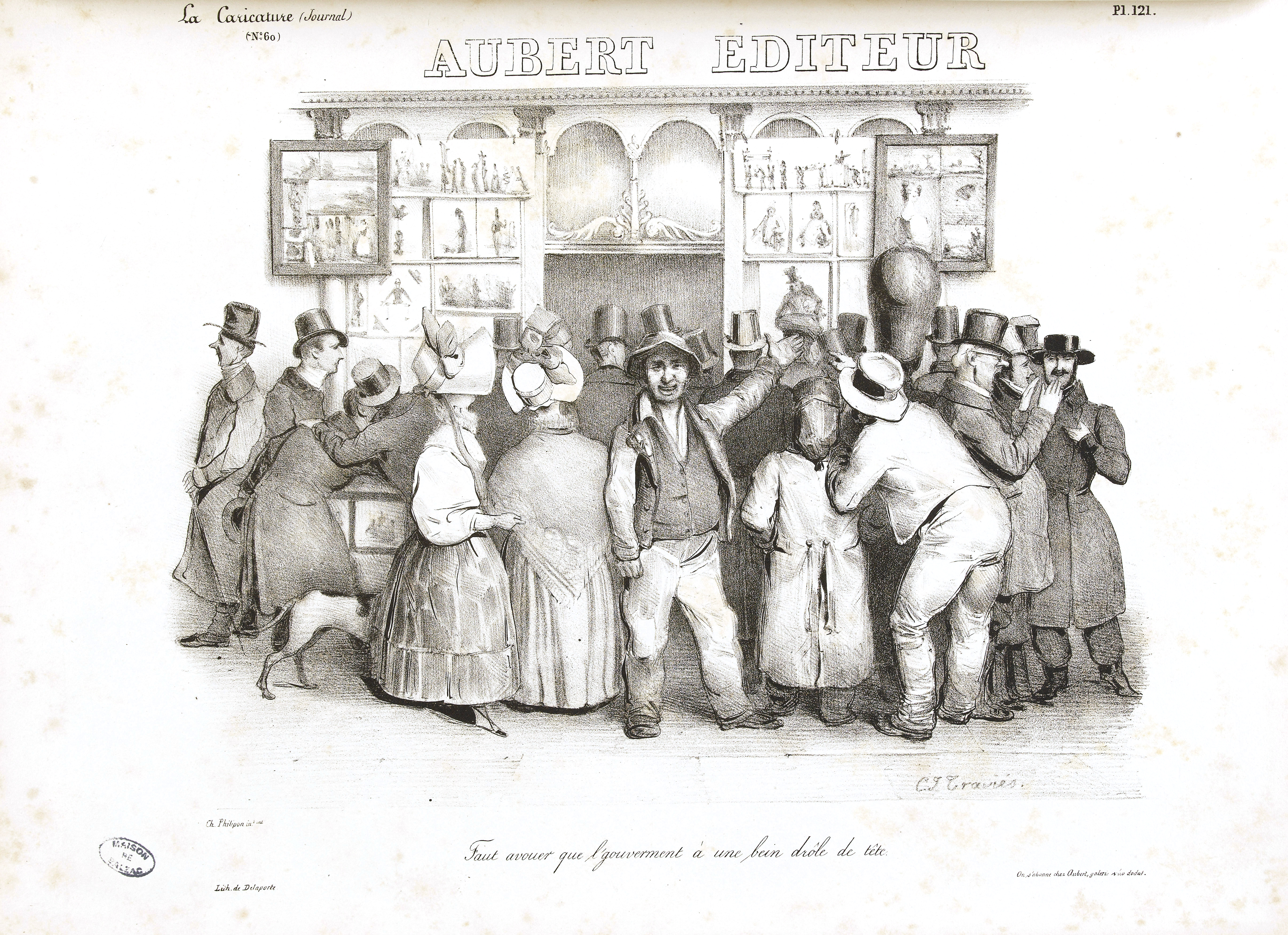
We have to admit that the government has a funny face. Traviès, 1831.

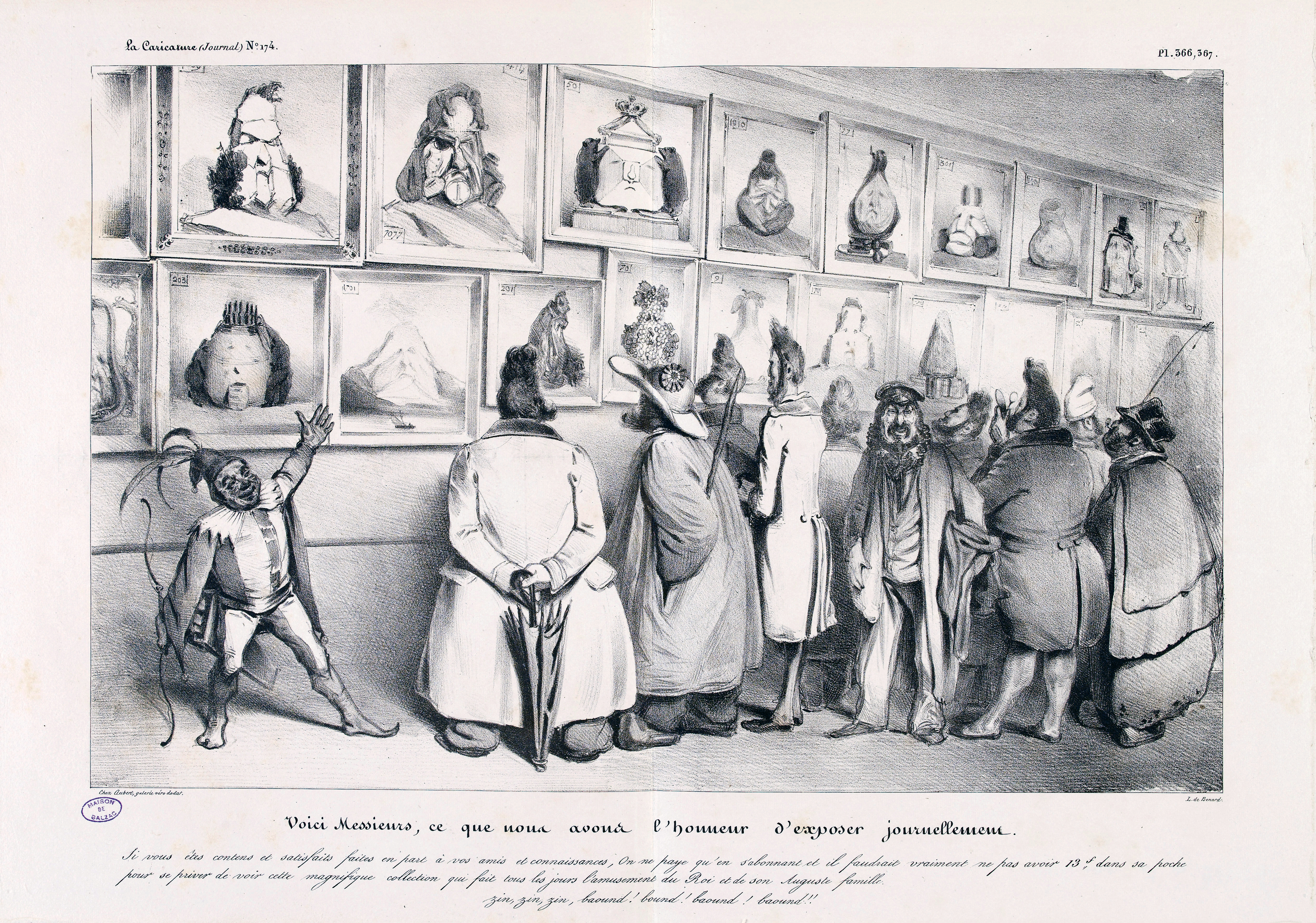
Voici Messieurs, ce que nous avons l'honneur d'exposer journellement, Traviès or Grandville, 1834.

We have to admit that the government had a funny idea. A lithograph by Traviès in December 1831, which was seized, shows a crowd of onlookers in front of a caricature of a pear in the window of the Aubert store. This image was reused in 1834 in a modified version where the king, in a “mirror image”, is his own spectator. The commentary on the latter states: “The Caricature has [...] its painting exhibition [...] which causes such a large crowd of onlookers to gather [...] in front of Aubert's shop [...] Yet they are only rocks, volcanoes, sacks of wheat, coats of arms, sideboards, houses, brioches, grapes, pears, barrels, etc.”

The lithographs were also sold by street vendors. Art students and bohemians, familiar with La Caricature, began to draw the pear on walls throughout the city. Frances Trollope, writing in 1835, described the prevalence of pears "of all sizes and shapes" on Parisian walls, seeing it as a form of public commentary on the reigning monarch. Many of these depictions were found in the Latin Quarter, where "charcoal-drawn pears" were notably common, some even featuring pears hanging from gallows. The motif was further adopted by street children, and both Fenimore Cooper and Alexandre Dumas noted the widespread appearance of pear drawings across the city's walls. La Caricature frequently reported on this graffiti, with Philipon taking pride in the motif's reach among the public.

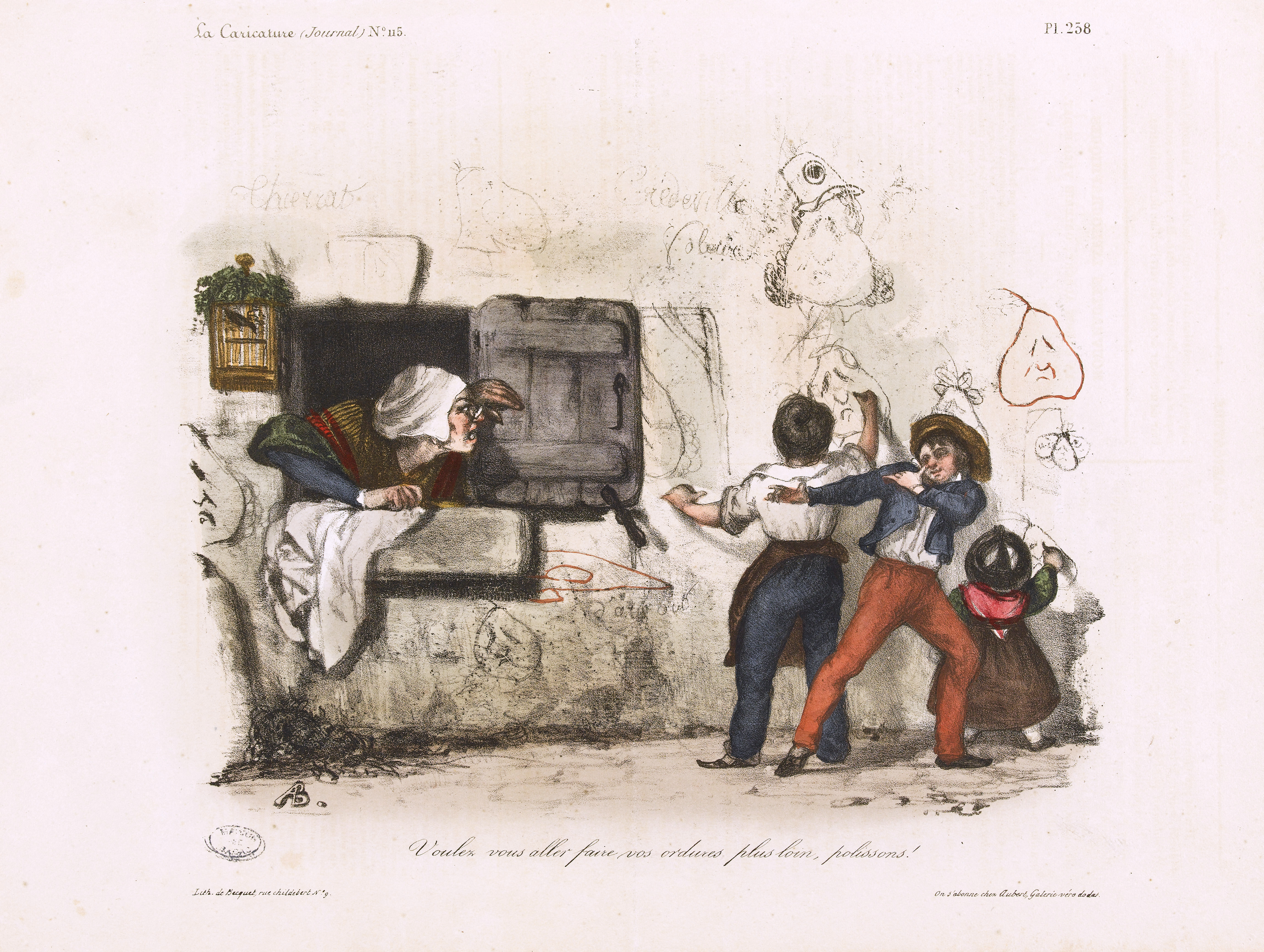
Voulez vous aller faire vos ordures ailleurs polissons, Bouquet, 1832.

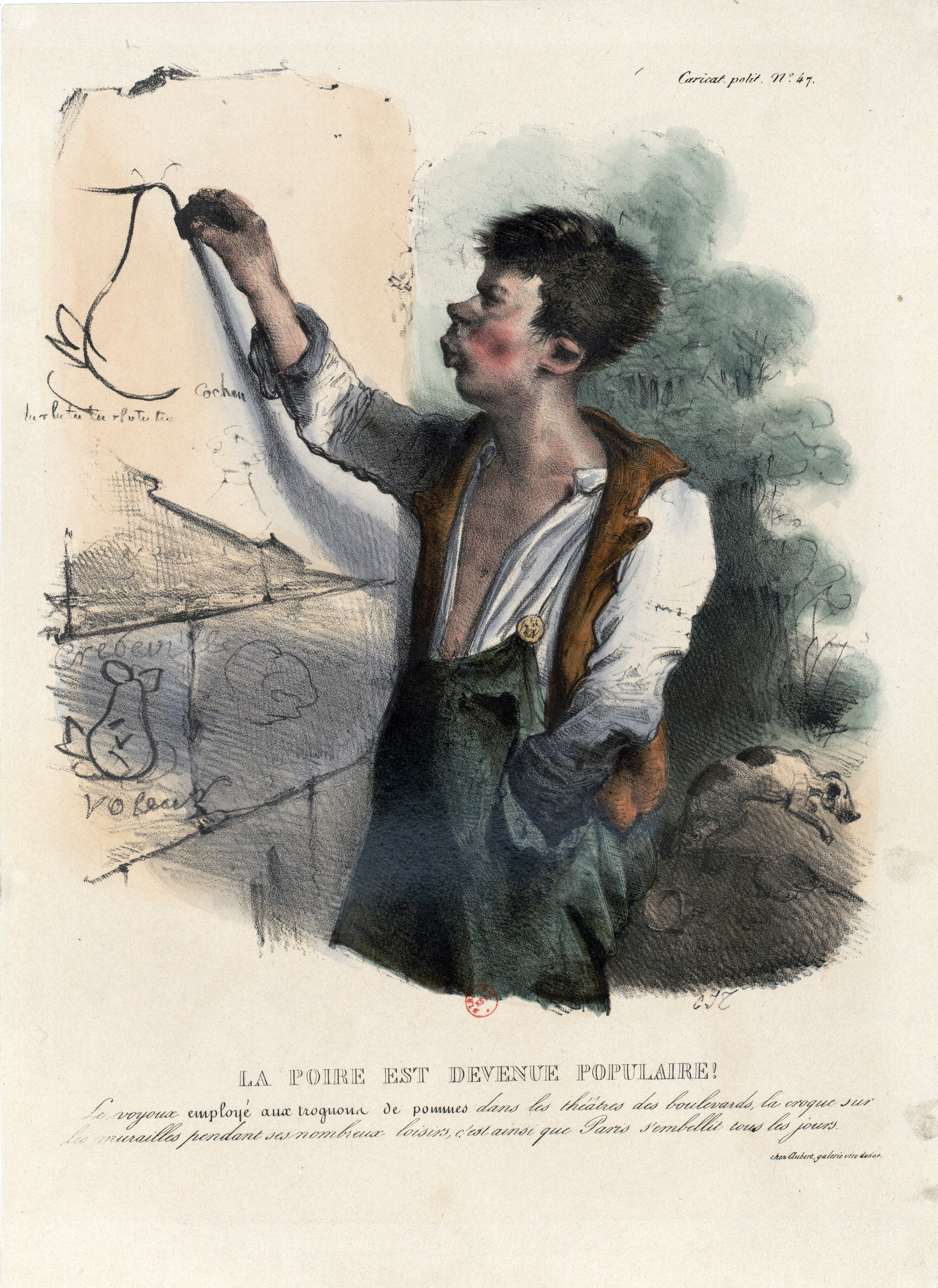
La poire est devenue populaire, Traviès, 1833.

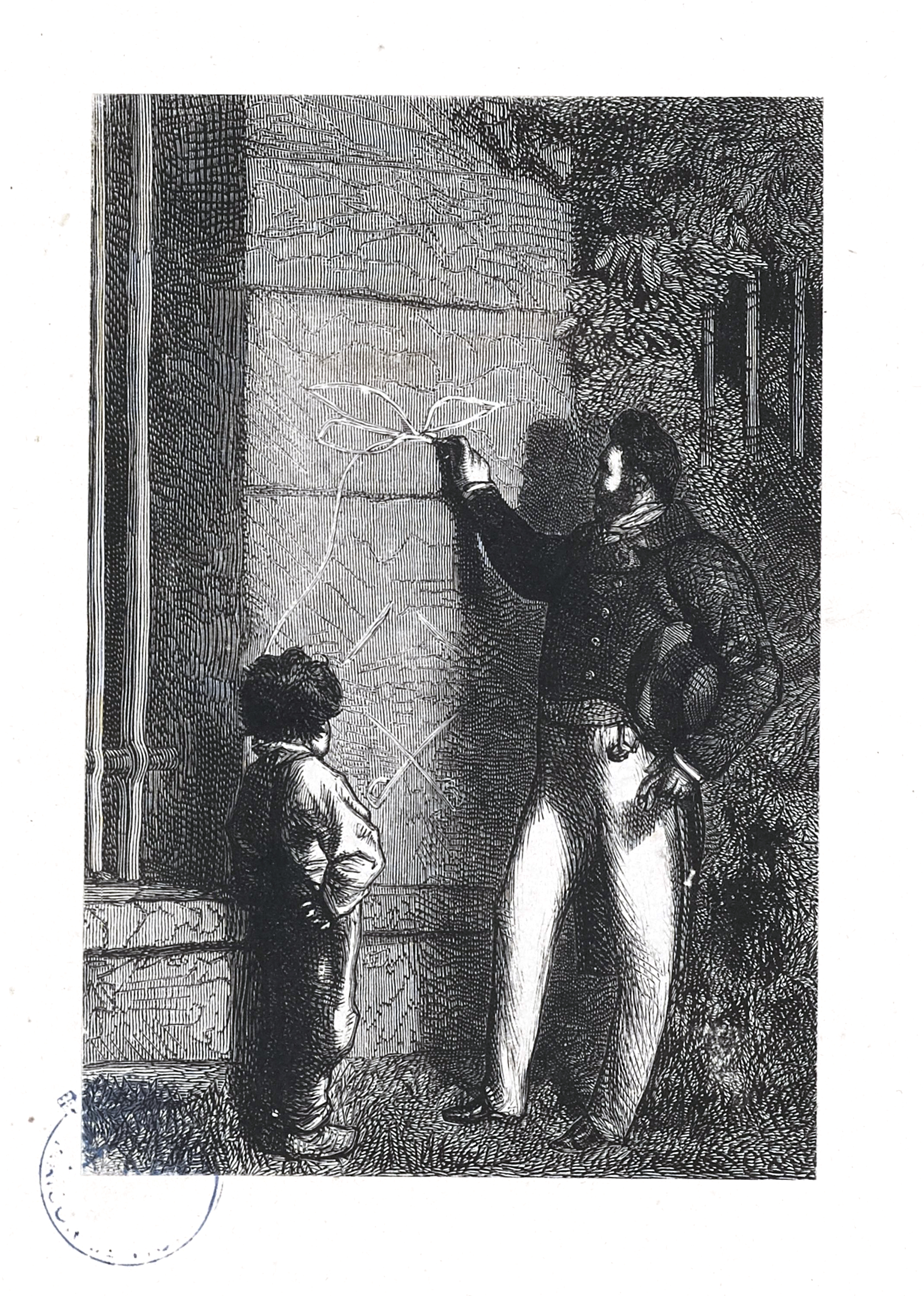
Les Misérables. Illustration by Brion, 1865.

The pears drawn on the walls by children, which are represented in the caricatures of Bouquet and Traviès, give rise to an anecdote related by Victor Hugo in Les Misérables: “One summer evening, Louis-Philippe, returning home on foot, saw a very small boy, this high, sweating and straining to blacken a gigantic pear on one of the pillars of the Neuilly gate; the king, with that bonhomie that came to him from Henri IV, helped the boy, finished the pear, and gave the child a Louis, saying to him: “The pear is also on it.”

The pear then spread throughout France. A journalist noted:

The symbolic pear has erupted beyond the barriers of the capital; it travels across France, appearing at every stagecoach stop and every crossroads. The foreign traveler approaching our borders recognizes, by the presence of this allegorical fruit scribbled on walls, that he is on French soil.

Gustave Flaubert even found it on the Pyramid of Khafre.

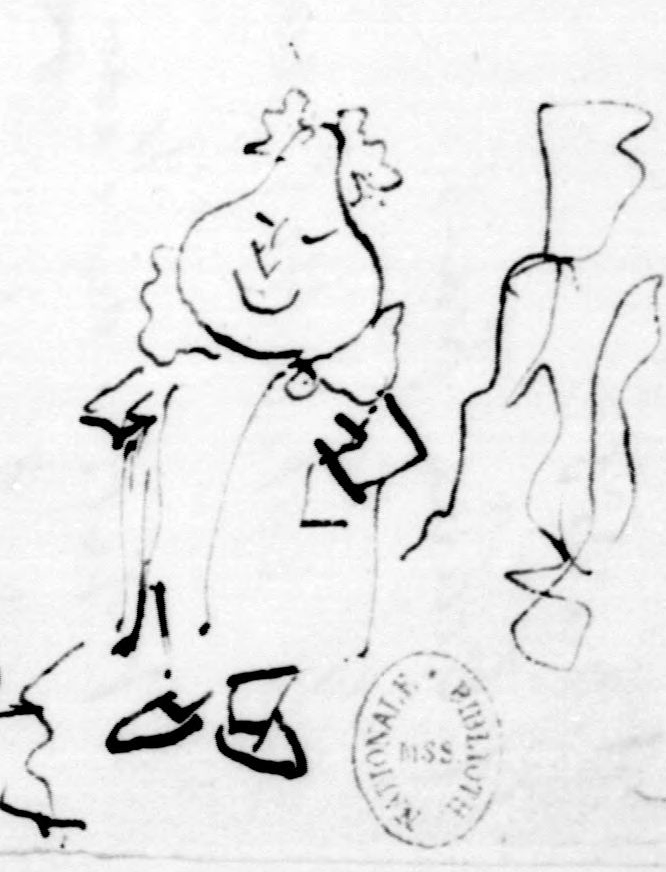
Hugo, 1835.

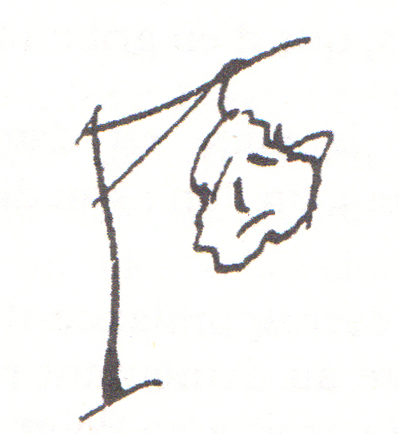
Stendhal, 1835.

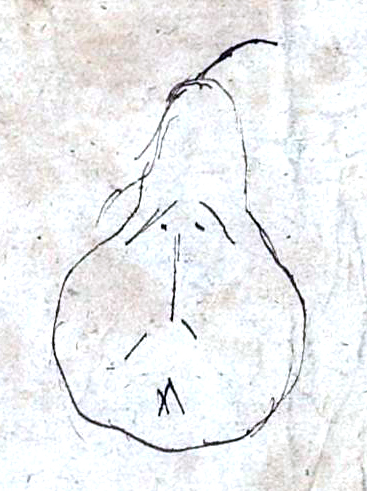
Flaubert, 1836.

At the time, scribbling on the Poire was such a familiar practice that Flaubert himself indulged in it in his manuscripts, as did Hugo and Stendhal.

=== Decline ===
Some caricatures featuring the pear were interpreted by the government press as a form of incitement, provoking a strong reaction from the authorities.

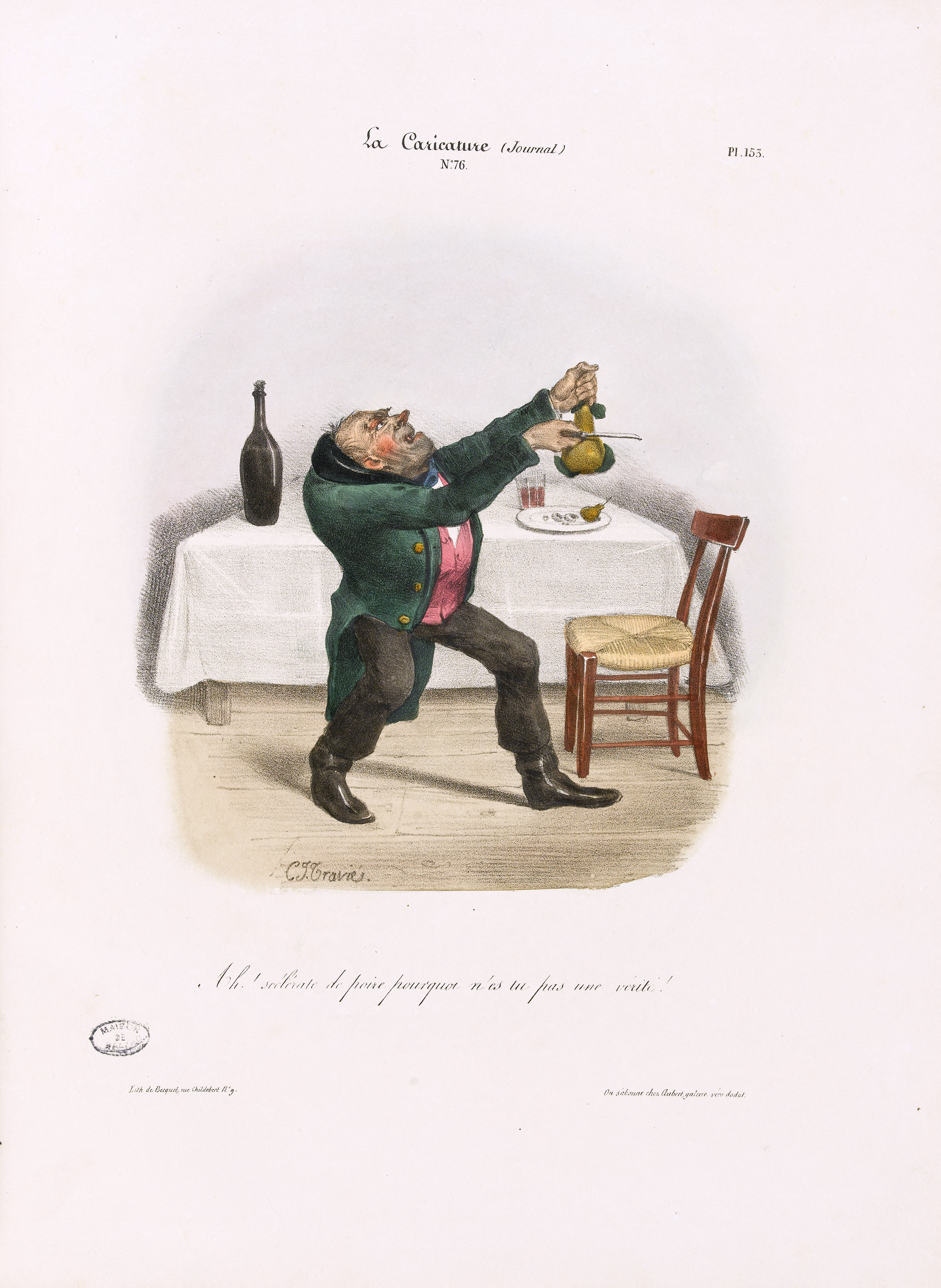
Ah! wretched pear, why are you not a truth! Traviès, 1832.

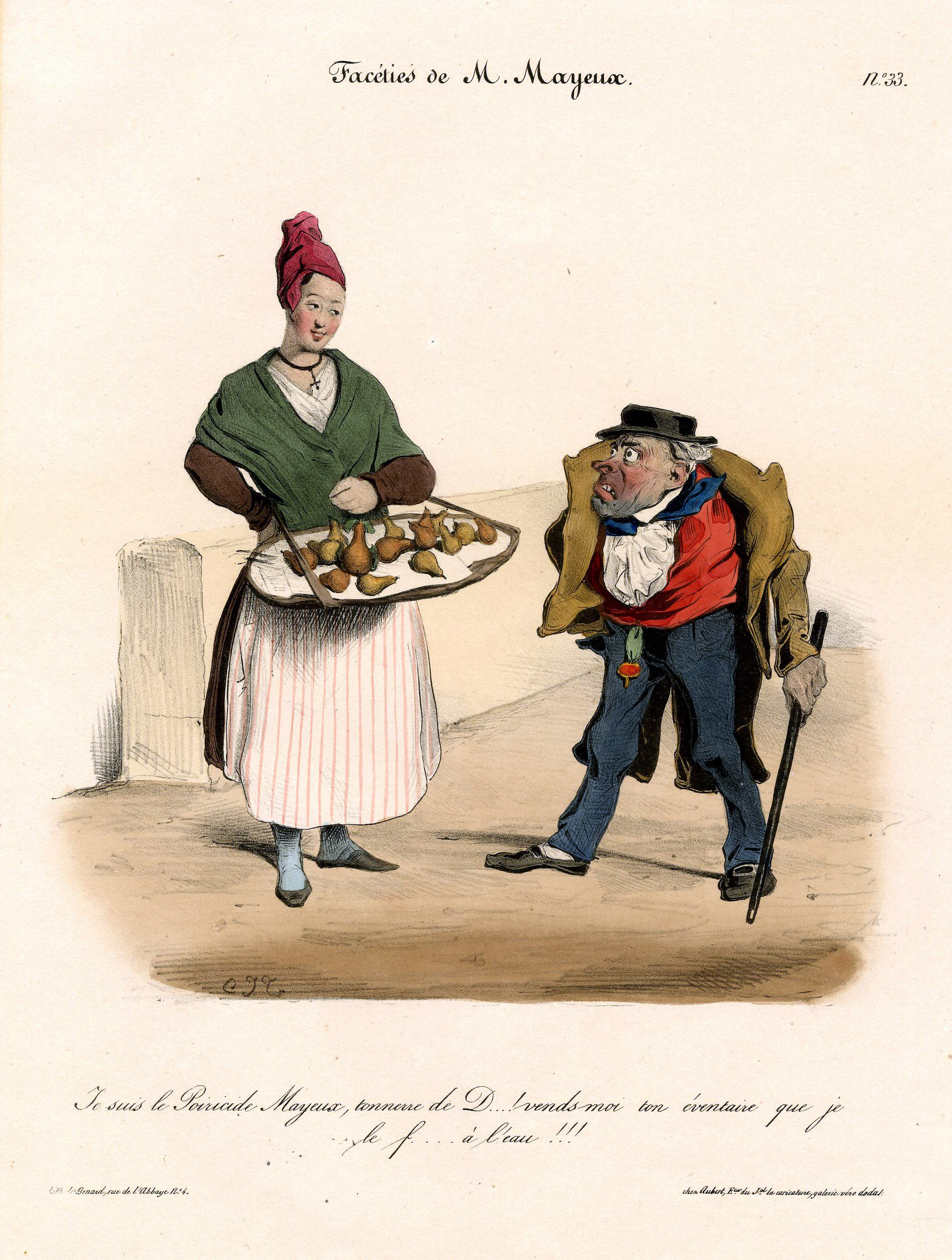
Je suis le poiricide Mayeux, Traviès, 1832

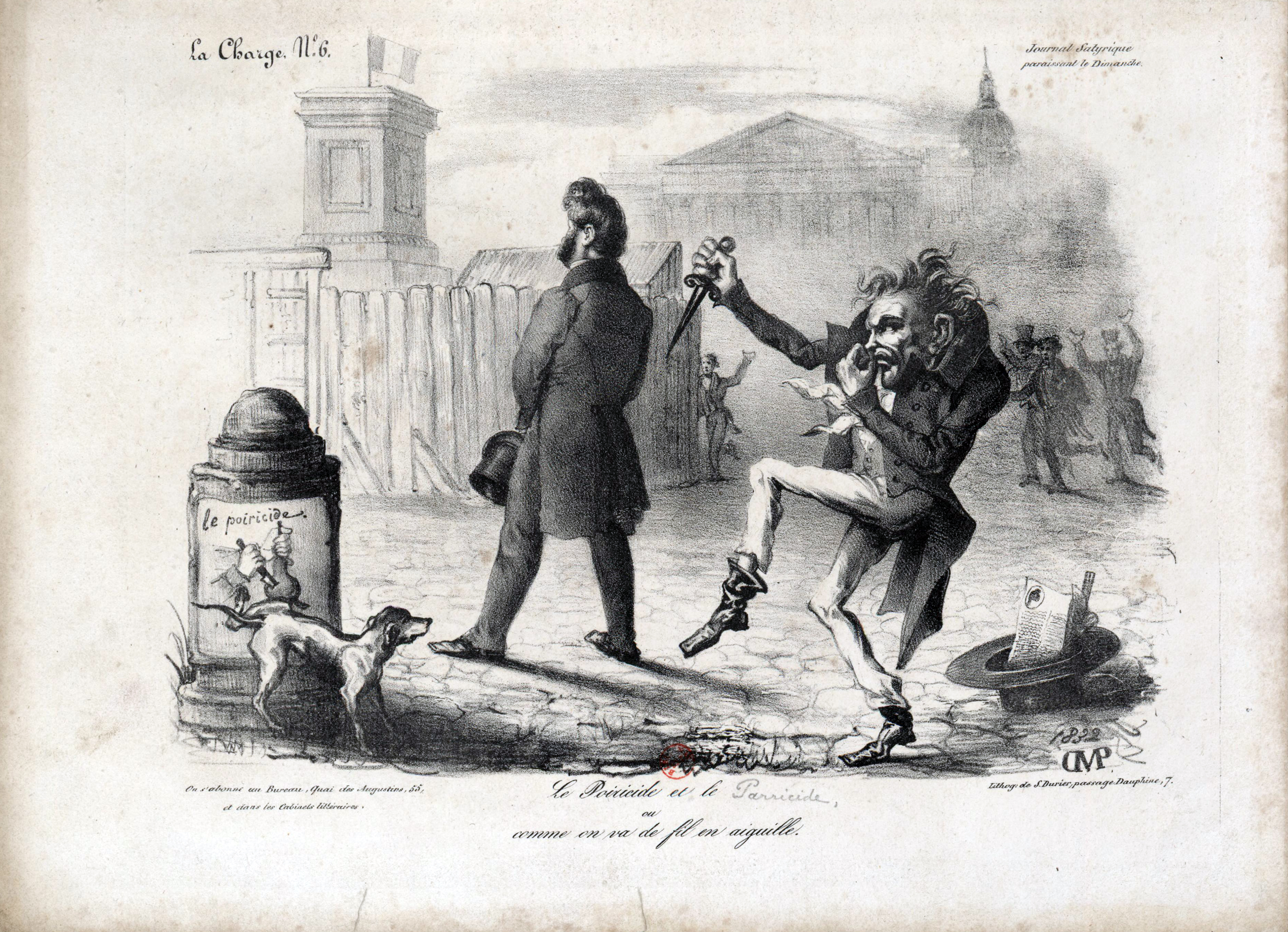
Le Poiricide, Delaporte, 1832

Ah! scélérate de poire pourquoi n'es tu pas une vérité! (Ah! you wicked pear, why aren't you the truth!) by Traviès, published on April 18, 1832 in La Caricature and which refers to Louis-Philippe's statement in 1830, “The Charter will henceforth be the truth,” shows a “pear-killing” Mayeux. The pear has a “priapic” shape that gives the caricature the sense of castration. The subject of Ah! Scélérate de poire pourquoi n'es tu pas une vérité! (Ah! Wicked pear, why aren't you the truth!) was thus taken up in 1832 in a caricature by Michel Delaporte published by La Charge, a pro-government satirical newspaper that saw itself as the antithesis of La Caricature, under the same title of Poiricide. It can be interpreted as a denunciation of Traviès' excesses: it shows Mayeux stabbing the king in the back. The hat on the ground, from which a sheet of paper emerges with a Phrygian cap drawn on it, suggests that the regicide to come will be attributed to the republicans, while on the other side, a dog urinates on a poster showing a man stabbing a pear.

In 1833 and 1834, several satirical processions incorporated the pear in politically charged contexts. In 1833, a large pear, measuring twelve feet high and eight feet wide, was paraded through Paris, drawing laughter from the public. However, when the police ordered its removal, tensions escalated—the pear was burned in public, leading to several arrests, with the police interpreting it as an allegory. A similar event occurred in Marseille the following year, when a "monstrous pear" was paraded, resulting in disorder and several casualties.

The government took various measures to suppress the pear motif. As Philipon recalled in 1846, "I can no longer count the seizures, arrest warrants, trials, duels, insults, attacks, and harassment." In January 1834, the Paris police prefect demanded the payment of a stamp tax on caricatures sold individually by street hawkers, which was later formalized by a law in February 1834, requiring prior authorization for such publications. The "seal" introduced by this law forced Philipon to suspend the publication of the Association mensuelle lithographique in September 1834, a series of lithographic plates that he sold by subscription to collectors. Fieschi's assassination attempt in July 1835 provided a pretext for the introduction of a new press law that mandated prior authorization for the publication of caricatures. The rapporteur for this law specifically cited "obscene engravings," "images that discredit draftsmen," and the "harm to family morals" posed by caricatures. This law argued that while the Charter prohibited censorship of writings and opinions, caricature was not considered an expression of opinion but rather "a fact, an enactment, a life."

This law forced Philipon to cease the publication of La Caricature, as he announced to the readers in the last issue of the periodical on August 27, 1835:

It took a law made specifically to break our pencils, a law that made it materially impossible to continue the work we had persevered with despite countless seizures, arrests without reason, crushing fines, and long imprisonments.

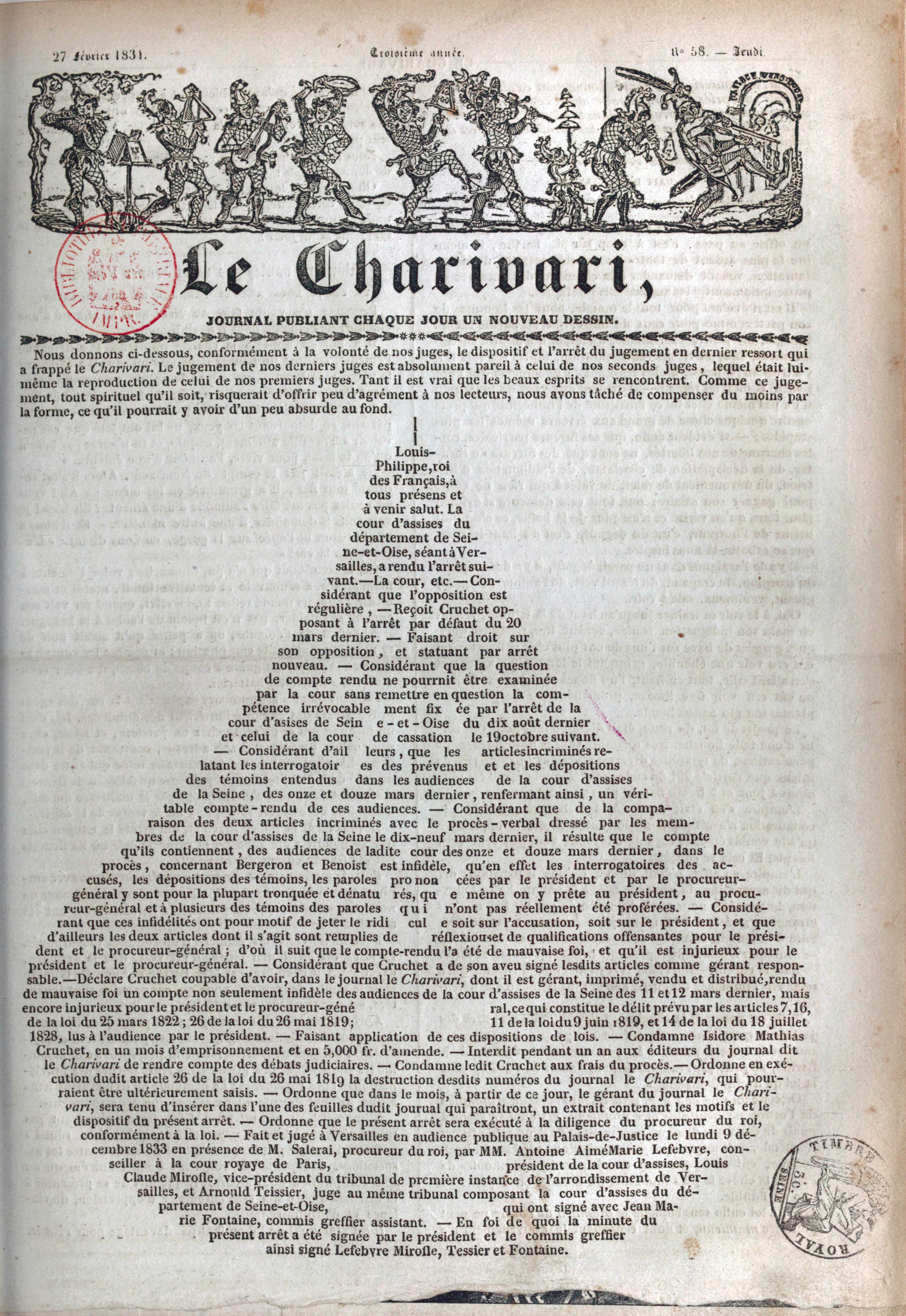
Le Charivari, February 27, 1834.

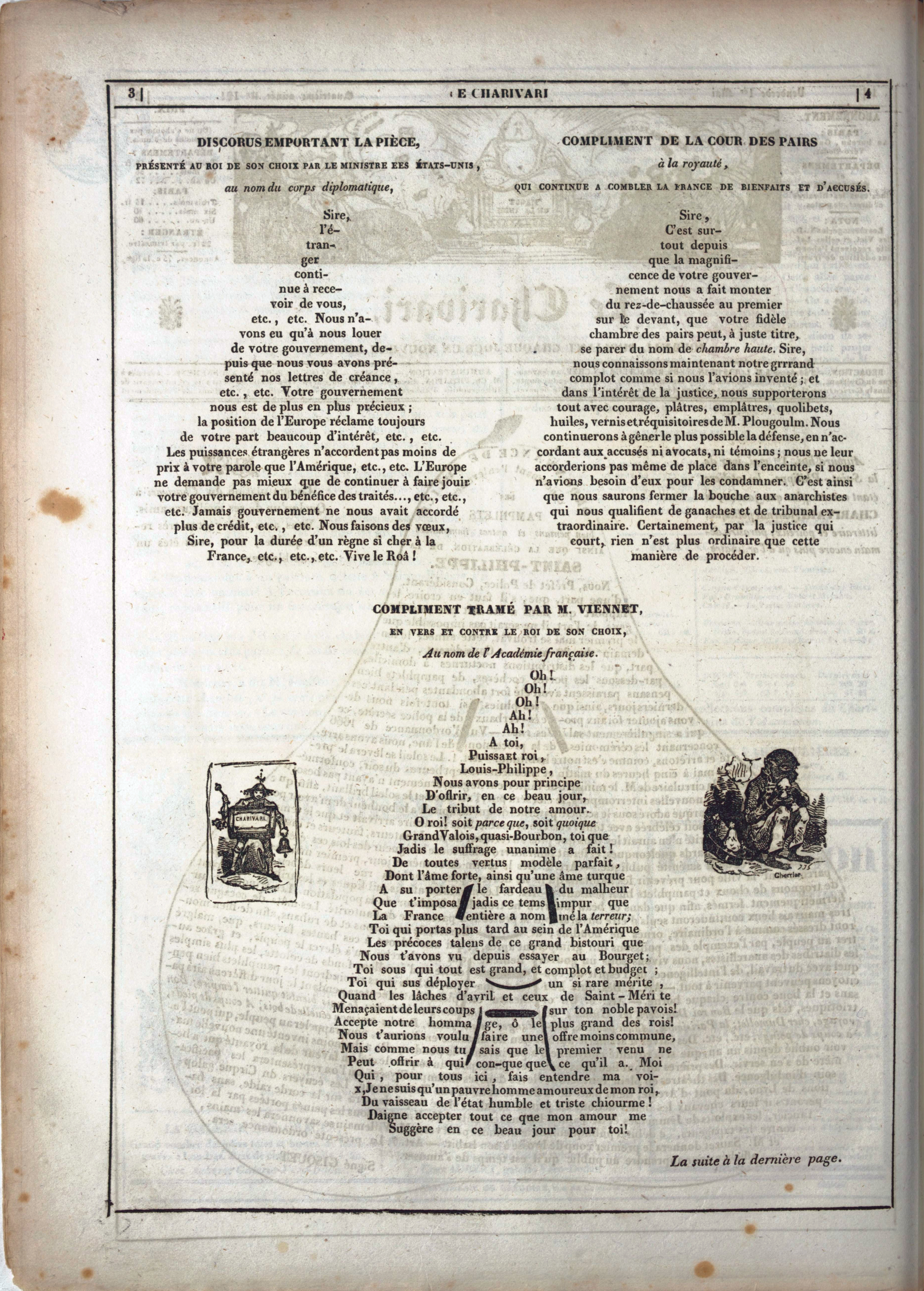
Le Charivari, May 1, 1835.

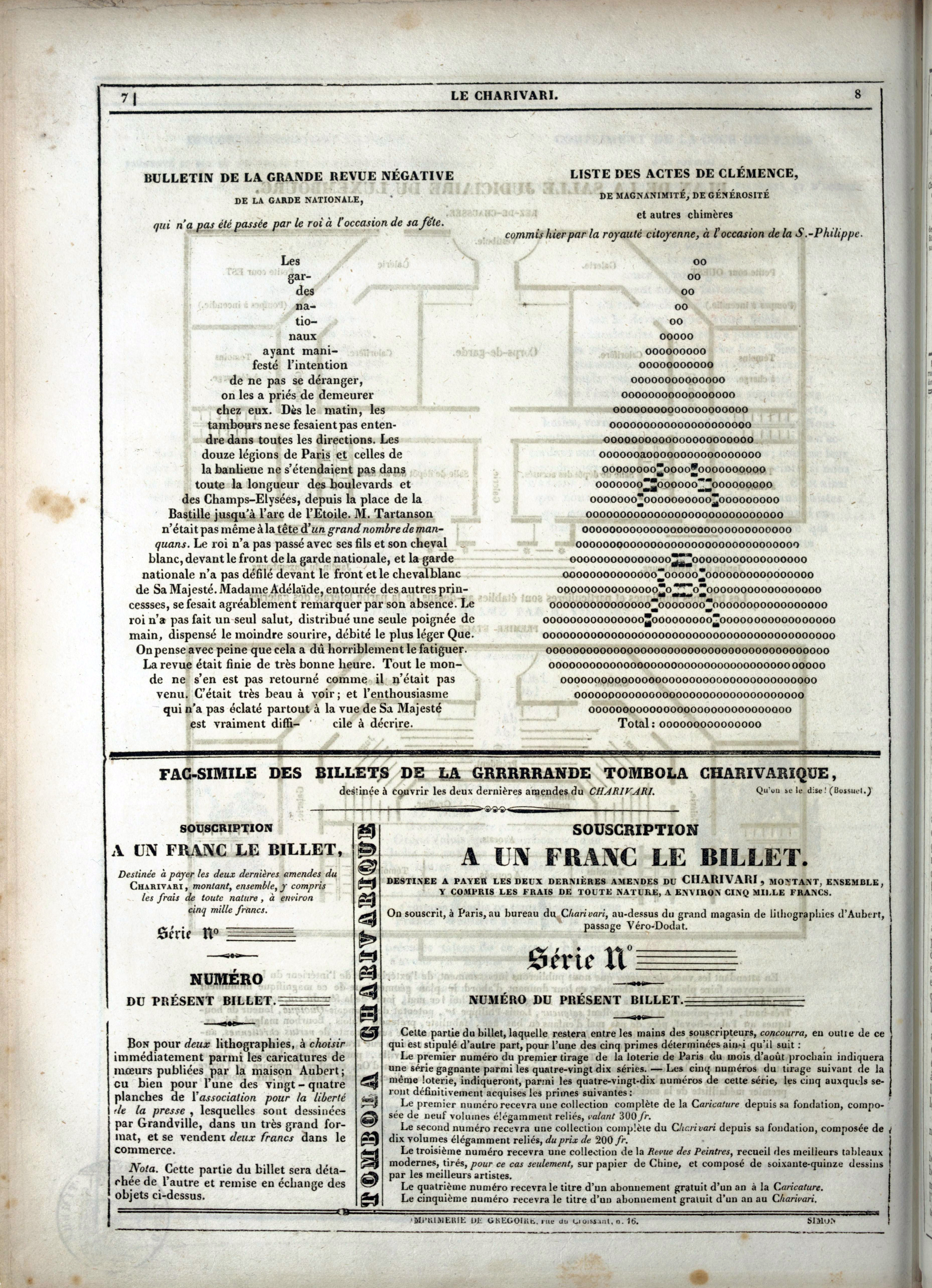
Le Charivari, May 1, 1835.

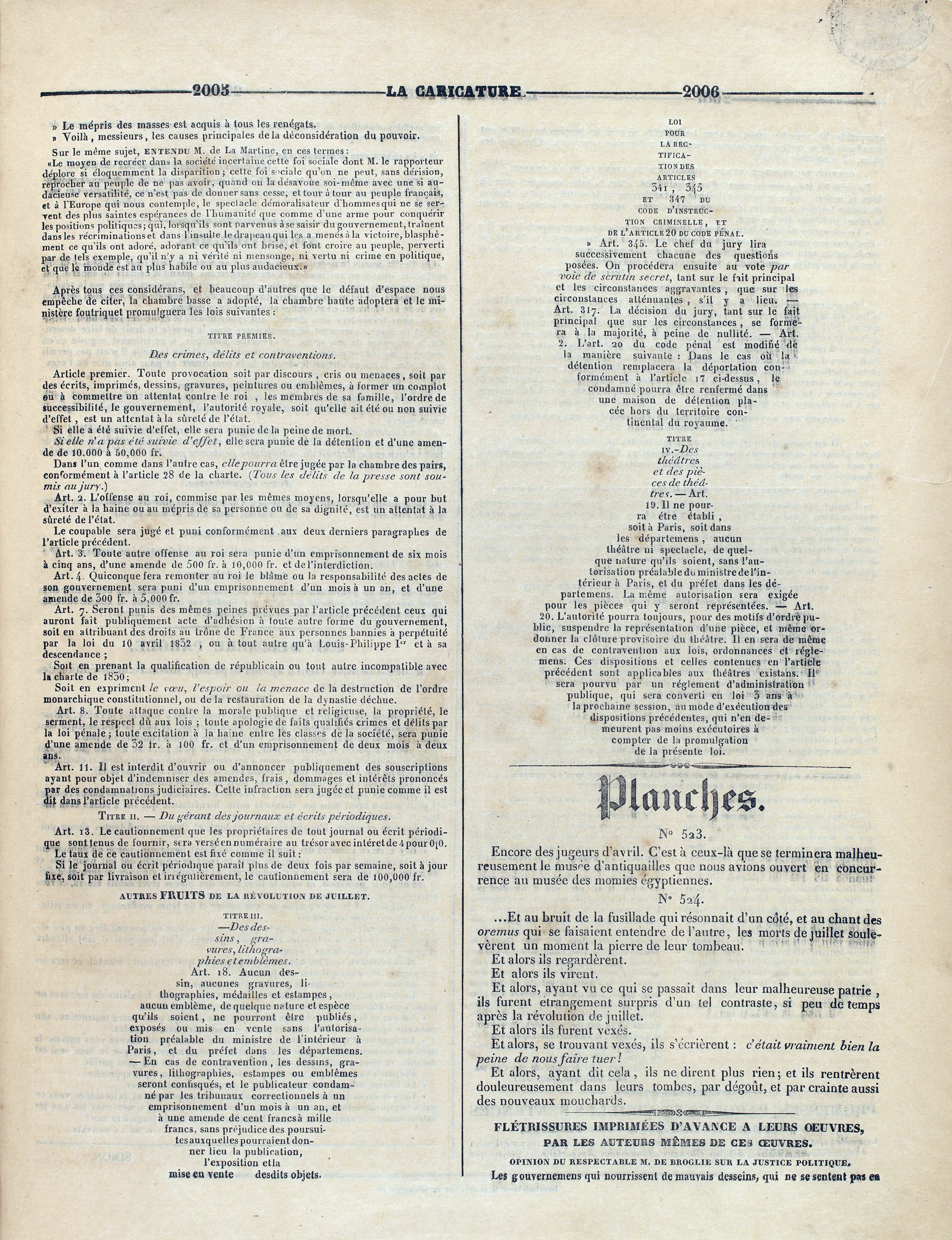
La Caricature, August 27, 1835.

The latest issue of La Caricature reproduces the articles of the law that muzzles it in the form of calligrams, a typographical process already used in Le Charivari in February 1834 to reproduce the text of a judgment condemning the newspaper, and in May 1835 for a special issue devoted to Saint Philip's Day, the feast of the king and Philipon. As Ségolène Le Men observes, in these calligrams the pear sometimes has the status of an emblem and sometimes that of a portrait which, “like a failed attempt by the typographer” exists “only in the typographical unconscious”, this “conative function” leaving it up to the spectator to imagine the royal physiognomy, absolving the printer and the editor of all responsibility and retracing the path of the croquis in reverse.

=== Legacy ===
"The pear is ripe" became a slogan of the February 1848 revolution, as evidenced by a note received by Frédéric Moreau, the protagonist of L'Éducation sentimentale. The pear motif resurfaced during this period, reflecting popular sentiments against the departing king, drawing on established graffiti and nicknames, even after being absent for thirteen years. Many lithographs continued to use this theme

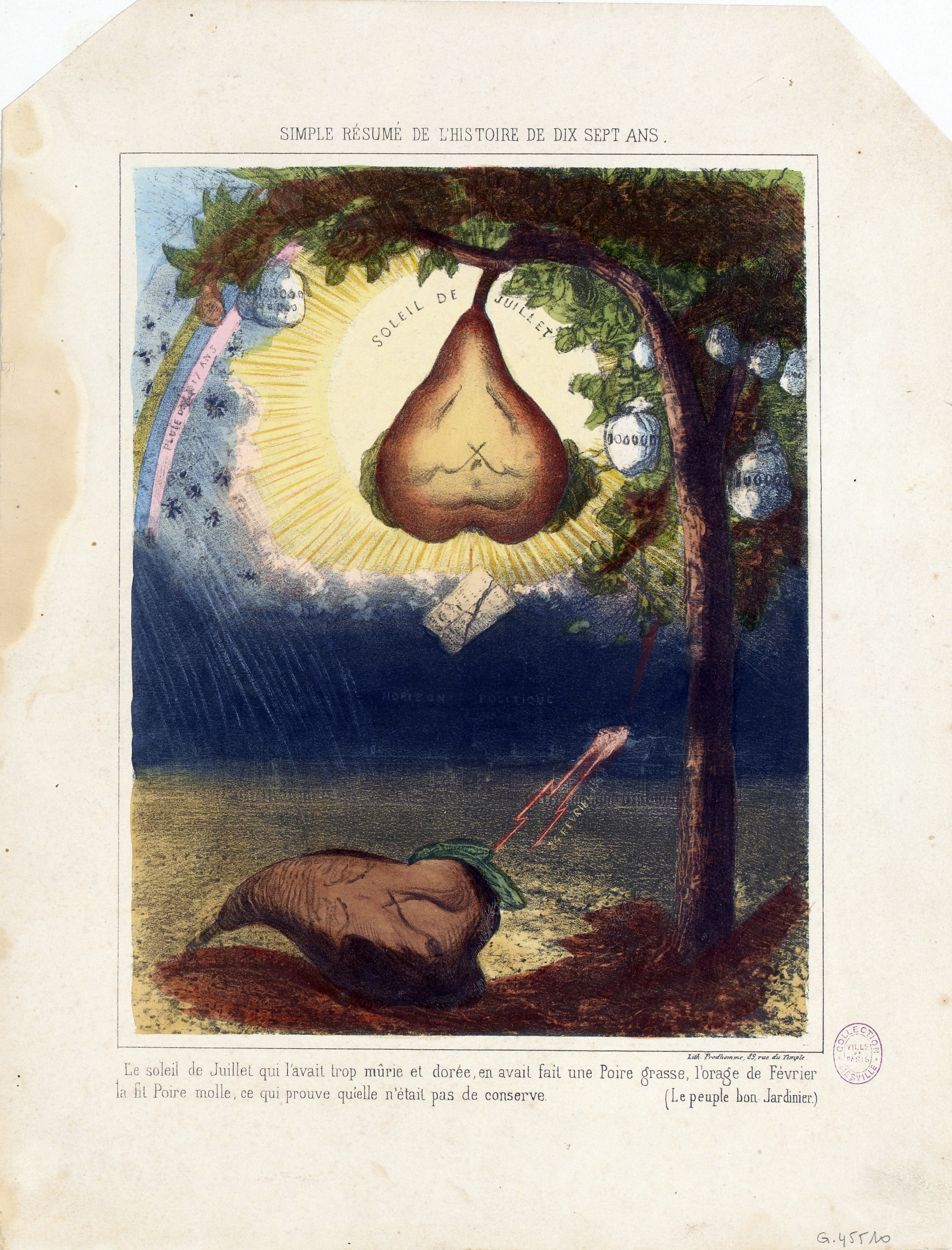
Simple résumé de l'histoire de dix sept ans, 1848.

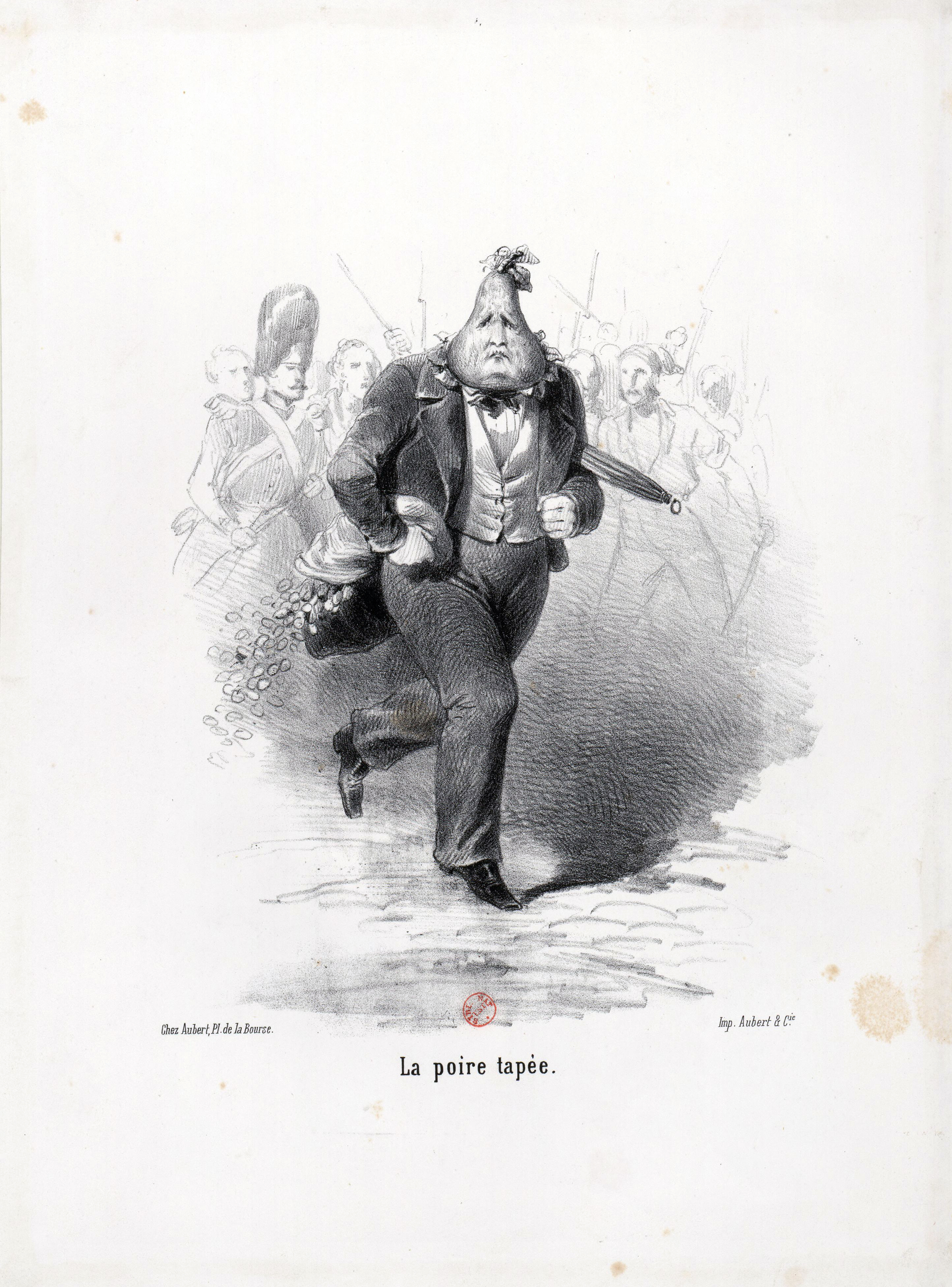
La Poire tapée, 1848.

The caption of the first cartoon reads: “The July sun, which had ripened and browned her too much, had made her a fat pear, the February storm made her a soft pear, which proves that she was not preserved.” The second shows Louis-Philippe as a pear in a jar (in a humorous reference to a common expression for a technique of preserving pears by drying them) leaking gold coins from his bag as he flees from an angry mob.

The pear motif was used once again in 1871, directly associated with its original meaning, targeting Adolphe Thiers to highlight his former Orléanist connections.

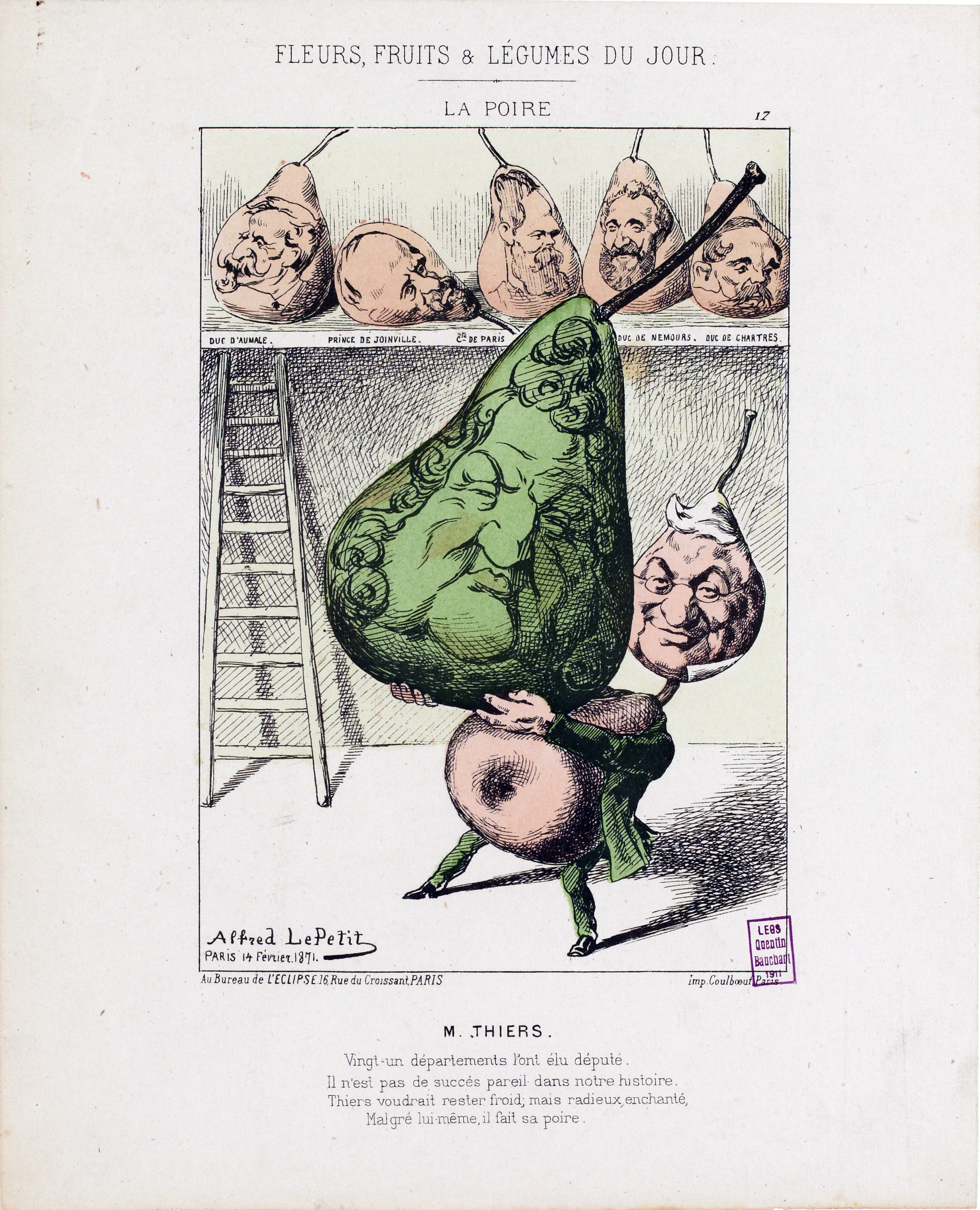
Fleurs fruits et légumes du jour. Zut, 1871.

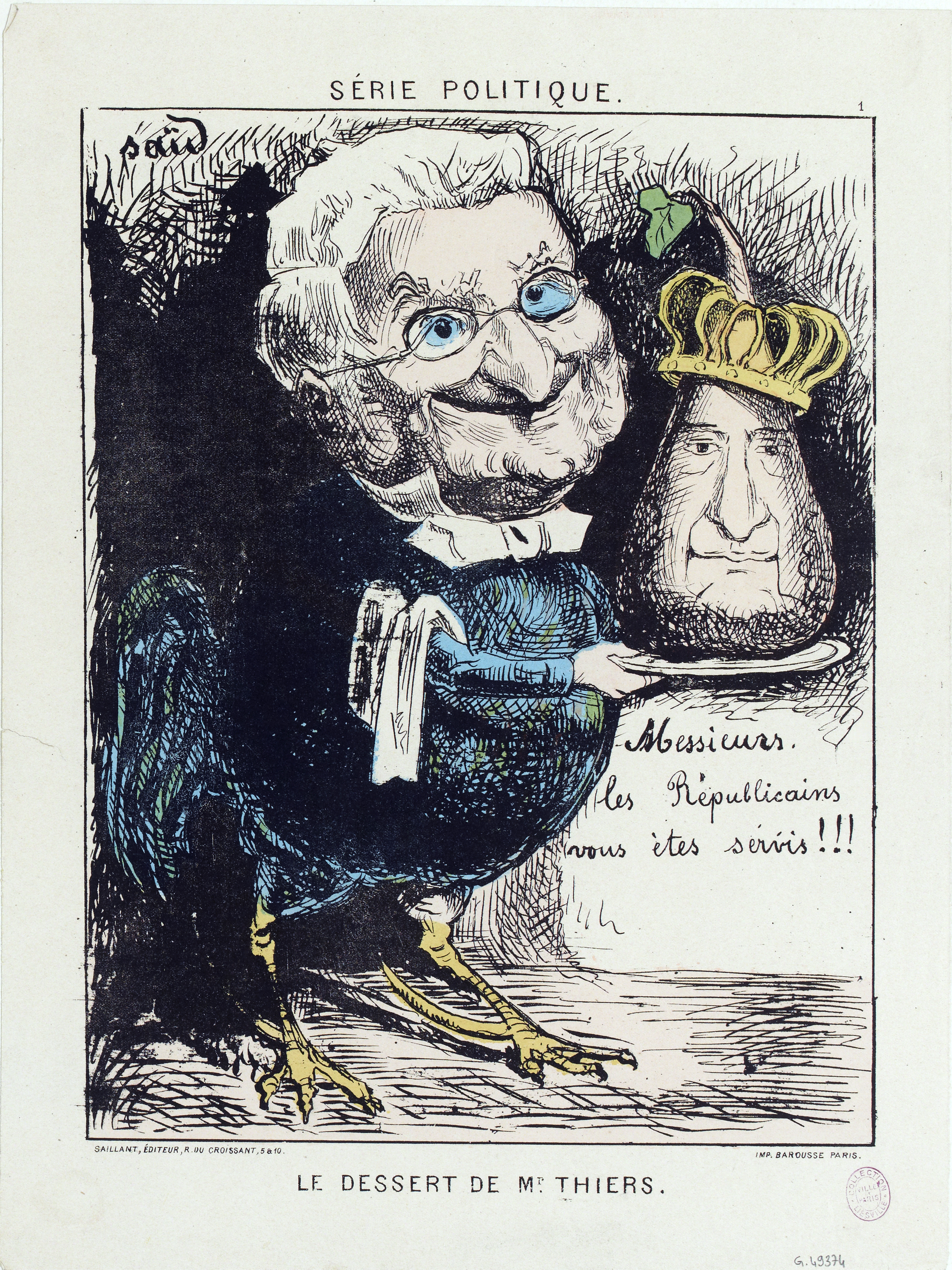
Le dessert de Monsieur Thiers. Saïd, 1871.

These caricatures, published in the context of the elections of 1871, recall the role played by Adolphe Thiers during the July Monarchy, whose emblem they exploit. In the first, Thiers offers the viewer the Poire (pear) while the heirs of Louis-Philippe, represented by five other pears, are present in the background. In the second, Thiers is presented as a false republican, seeking to “serve” the voters a monarchist Poire.

1896, the pear appeared in a new context with Alfred Jarry's Ubu, where it was no longer purely caricatural but symbolized a king devoid of traditional authority and served as a reference to a subversive image. According to critic Henry Bauër, who supported the play during its initial performances, Ubu's expressions "evoke the beatitudes of Father La Poire and the July Monarchy."

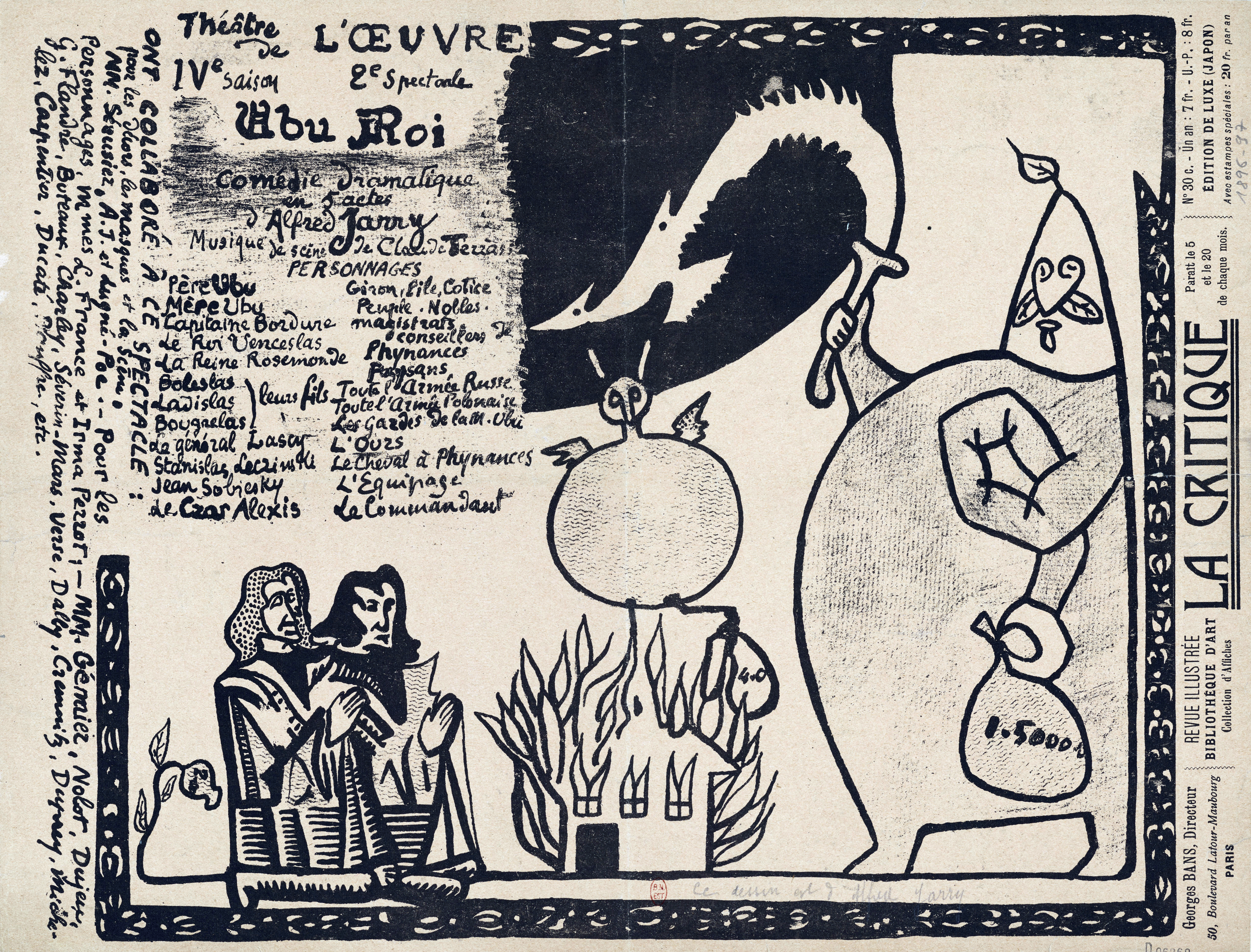
Programme d'Ubu Roi. Alfred Jarry, 1896.

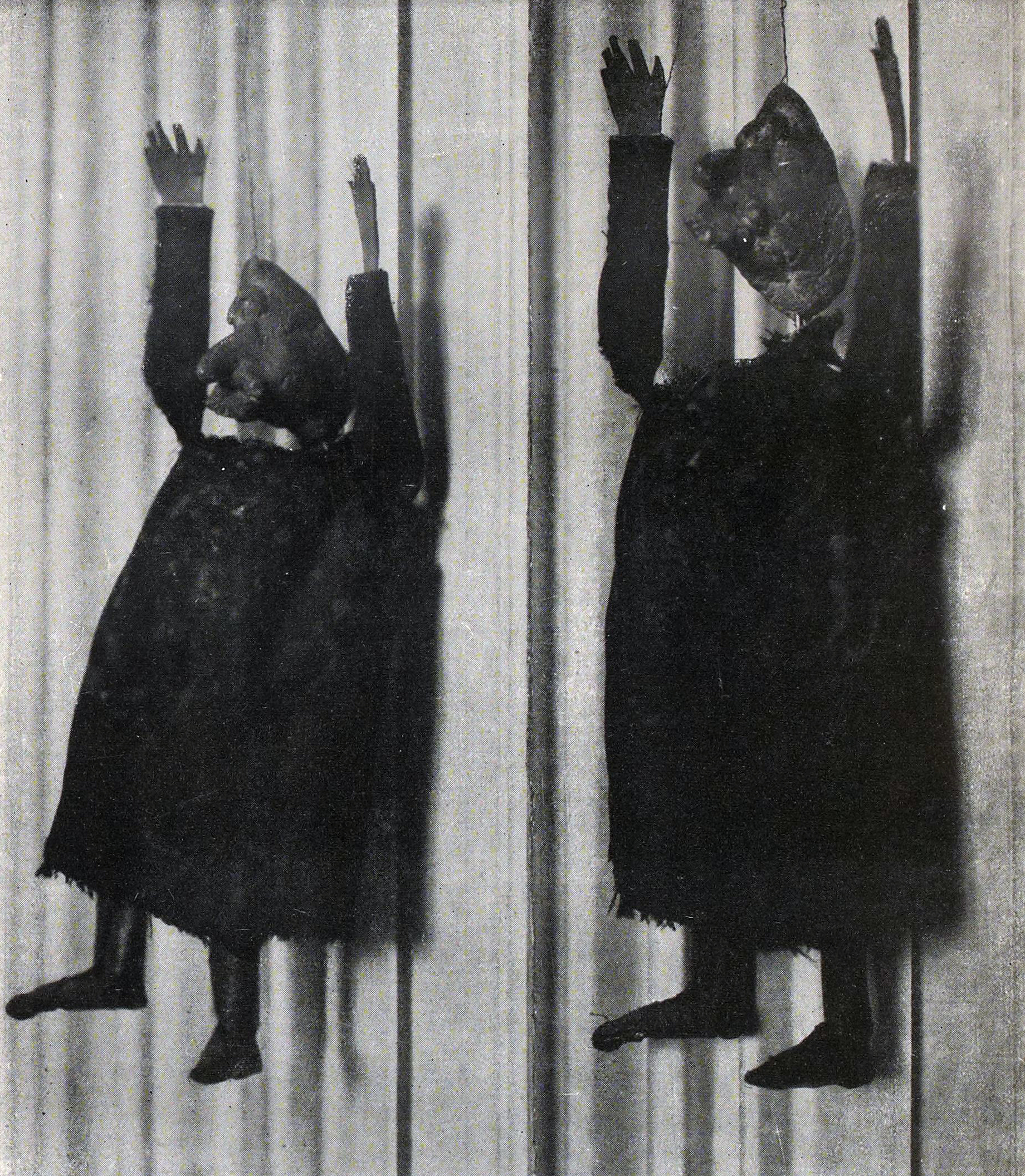
Two states of the puppet of Père Ubu modeled by Alfred Jarry in 1898.

Elizabeth Menon emphasizes that both the pear-shaped aspect and the scatological dimension of Père Ubu refer to the versions of La Poire given by Traviès and Daumier. She cites as proof the Rabelaisian epigraph of Ubu roi, which evokes the shaking of the pear in La Tête branlante, a lithograph by Daumier: “Then Father Ubu shook the pear, which the English have since named Shakespeare, and have written many beautiful tragedies by him under that name.”

The pear motif continued to be a presence in Jarry's circle, with Erik Satie titling one of his compositions Trois morceaux en forme de poire, and Man Ray incorporating it in various works, including a painting, a lithograph, and a ready-made, where the pear "sits, motionless and unusual." Guillaume Apollinaire, another close associate of Jarry, was linked to the pear as well. Paul Léautaud noted in his journal that he had mocked the "Louis-Philippe style" of the poet, citing his chubby, pear-shaped face. Pablo Picasso also caricatured Apollinaire as a pear. Moreover, as Ségolène Le Men observes, Jarry's use of the pear sign, detached from the portrait of Louis-Philippe, foreshadowed its later use by 20th-century artists, particularly Victor Brauner, Vassily Kandinsky, and Joan Miró. For these artists, the pear symbol held "a strong plastic presence, associated with obscene graffiti, children's drawings, and the expressive stylization of the silhouette and face. René Magritte also incorporated the pear sign into his works between 1947 and 1952, notably in Le Lyrisme and Alice in Wonderland.

By the end of the 20th century, the pear motif was frequently used by caricaturists to represent political figures. In the 1970s, Philip Guston used it to caricature Richard Nixon; in the 1980s, Hans Traxler used it against Helmut Kohl; in the 1990s, Wiaz used it to mock Édouard Balladur; and in the early 21st century, it was again used to satirize François Hollande. Fabrice Erre concludes that the pear functions as a graphic sign, reflecting the bourgeois shift in politics that began during the July Monarchy but has remained relevant and effective throughout modern history.

== See also ==
- Portrait of Monsieur Bertin

== Bibliography ==
- DeTurck Bechtel, Edwin (1952). Freedom of the press and l'Association mensuelle: Philipon versus Louis-Philippe. New York: The Grolier Club.
- Blum, André (1920). "La Caricature politique en France sous la monarchie de Juillet" [Political Caricature in France under the July Monarchy]. Gazette des Beaux-Arts (in French). 16 (703): 269–277.
- Boime, Albert (2004). "Fractures in the Juste-Milieu". Art in an Age of Counterrevolution, 1815-1848. Chicago: University of Chicago Press. pp. 323–410.
- Carteret, Léopold (1927). Le Trésor du bibliophile: Époque romantique 1801-1875 [The bibliophile's treasure trove: Romantic period 1801-1875] (in French). Paris: Léopold Carteret.
- Champfleury (1865). Histoire de la caricature moderne [History of modern caricature] (in French). Paris: E. Dentu.
- Childs, Elizabeth (1992). "Big Trouble: Daumier, Gargantua, and the Censorship of Political Caricature". Art Journal. 51 (1): 26–37. doi:10.2307/777251. JSTOR 777251.
- Clément, Jean-Paul; Régnier, Philippe (1994). Caricatures politiques, 1829-1848: De l'éteignoir à la poire [Political Cartoons, 1829-1848: From the Snub to the Pear] (in French). Châtenay-Malabry: Maison de Chateaubriand.
- Cuno, James (1983). "Charles Philipon, La Maison Aubert, and the Business of Caricature in Paris, 1829-41". Art Journal. 43 (1): 347–354. doi:10.2307/776732. JSTOR 776732.
- Cuno, James (1984). "Charles Philipon and "La Poire": Politics ans Pornography in Emblematic Satire, 1830-1835". Proceedings of the Consortium on Revolutionary Europe. 13: 147–156.
- Cuno, James (1985). Charles Philipon and La Maison Aubert: The Business, Politics, and Public of Caricature in Paris, 1820-1840 (PhD thesis). Cambridge: Harvard University.
- Cuno, James (1986). "Charles Philipon: The Education of a Caricaturist and the Politics of Transformation". Proceedings of the Consortium on Revolutionary Europe. 14: 85–98.
- Erre, Fabrice (2011). Le Règne de la poire: Caricatures de l'esprit bourgeois de Louis-Philippe à nos jours [Le Règne de la poire: Caricatures of the bourgeois spirit from Louis-Philippe to the present day] (in French). Paris: Champvallon.
- Goldstein, Robert J. (1989a). Censorship of Political Caricature in Nineteenth-century France. Kent: Kent State University Press.
- Grand-Carteret, John (1888). Les Mœurs et la Caricature en France [Manners and Caricature in France] (in French). Paris: La Librairie illustrée.
- Guédron, Martial (2020). "Physiognomonie du ventre: La ploutocratie juste-milieu" [Physiognomy of the belly: The fair-middle plutocracy]. Allégories de l'estomac au XIXe siècle: Littérature, art, philosophie [Allegories of the stomach in the 19th century: Literature, art, philosophy] (in French). Strasbourg: Presses universitaires de Strasbourg. pp. 41–58. doi:10.4000/books.pus.23973. ISBN 979-10-344-0061-4.
- Johnson, Dorothy (2018). "Food for Thought: Consuming and Digesting as Political Metaphor in French Satirical Prints". Gut Feeling and Digestive Health in Nineteenth-Century Literature, History and Culture. Palgrave Studies in Literature, Science and Medicine (in French). London: Palgrave Macmillan. pp. 85–108. doi:10.1007/978-3-030-01857-3_5. ISBN 978-3-030-01856-6.
- Kenney, Elise K; Merriman, John M (1991). The Pear: French Graphic Arts in the Golden Age of Caricature. South Hadley: Mount Holyoke College Art Museum.
- Kerr, David S (2000). Caricature and French Political Culture 1830-1848: Charles Philipon and the Illustrated Press. Oxford: Clarendon Press.
- Labridy-Stofle, Corine (2017). Charles Philipon, La Caricature, 1830-1835: Lithographies complètes [Charles Philipon, La Caricature, 1830-1835: Complete lithographs]. San Francisco: Alan Wofsy.
- Le Men, Ségolène (1984). "Calligraphie, calligramme, caricature" [Calligraphy, calligrams, caricatures]. Langages (in French). 19 (75): 83–101. doi:10.3406/lgge.1984.1184.
- Le Men, Ségolène (2004). "Gravures, caricatures et images cachées: La genèse du signe du roi en Poire" [Engravings, caricatures and hidden images: The genesis of the King's Pear tree symbol]. Genesis (Manuscrits-Recherche-Invention) (in French). 24 (24): 42–69. doi:10.3406/item.2004.1314.
- Le Men, Ségolène (2007). "Le Ventre et la Poire: caricatures politiques et corps grotesques (1830-1835)" [Le Ventre et la Poire: political caricatures and grotesque bodies (1830-1835)]. Cahiers Daumier (in French) (1).
- Le Men, Ségolène (2008). Daumier et la caricature [Daumier and caricature] (in French). Paris: Citadelles et Mazenod.
- Le Men, Ségolène (2010). "Le Roi-Poire et le Charivari-monstre" [The King-Poire and the Charivari-monster]. Rire avec les monstres: Caricature, Étrangeté et Fantasmagorie [Laughing with the monsters: Caricature, Strangeness and Phantasmagoria] (in French). Trouville-sur-mer: Illustria - Librairie des musées. pp. 99–108. Archived from the original on November 17, 2021.
- Menon, Elizabeth (1998). The Complete Mayeux: Use and Abuse of a French Icon. Bern: Peter Lang.
- Nesci, Catherine (2017). "Fragments d'un discours séditieux: Satire politique et iconoclasme sous la monarchie de Juillet" [Fragments of a seditious speech: Political satire and iconoclasm under the July Monarchy]. Raconter d'autres partages ». Littérature, anthropologie et histoire culturelle: Mélanges offerts à Nicole Jacques-Lefèvre [Telling of other sharing. Literature, anthropology and cultural history: Festschrift offered to Nicole Jacques-Lefèvre] (in French). Lyon: ENS Éditions. pp. 99–108. doi:10.4000/books.enseditions.8329.
- Patten, Robert L. (2011). "Signifying Shape in Pan-European Caricature". The Efflorescence of Caricature.1759-1838. London: Routledge.
- Petrey, Sandy (1991). "Pears in History". Representations (in French) (35): 52–71. doi:10.2307/2928716. JSTOR 2928716.
- Petrey, Sandy (2005). In the Court of the Pear King: French Culture and the Rise of Realism. Ithaca: Cornell University Press.
- Peytel, Sébastien-Benoît (1832). Physiologie de la poire [Physiology of the pear] (in French). Paris.
- Preiss, Nathalie (2002a). "De «pouff» à «pschitt»! — de la blague et de la caricature politique sous la monarchie de juillet et après..." [From "pouff" to "pschitt"! - jokes and political caricatures during and after the July Monarchy...] (PDF). Romantisme (in French). 32 (116): 5–17. doi:10.3406/roman.2002.1104.
- Preiss, Nathalie (2002b). Pour de rire ! La Blague au XIXe siècle [Just for fun! Jokes in the nineteenth century] (in French). Paris: Presses universitaires de France.
- Weisberg, Gabriel (1989). "The Coded Image: Agitation in Aspects of Political and Social Caricature". The Art of The July Monarchy, France, 1830-1848. Columbia: University of Missouri Press. pp. 148–191.
