= La Caricature (1830–1843) =

Defunct weekly satirical magazine (1830–1843)

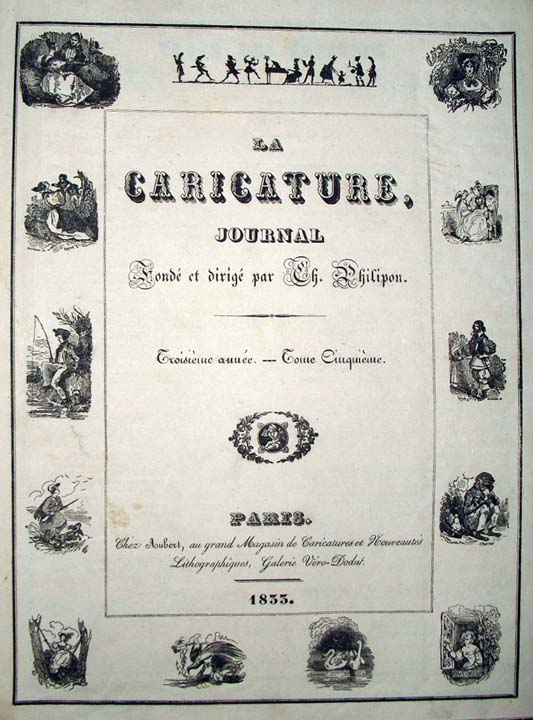
- Cover of an 1833 edition
- Editor: Auguste Audibert
- Categories: Political satire
- Frequency: Weekly
- Founded: 1830
- Final issue: 1843
- Country: France
- Based in: Paris
- Language: French
- ISSN: 1169-2502

La Caricature was a satirical weekly French periodical that was distributed in Paris between 1830 and 1843 during the July Monarchy. Its cartoons repeatedly attacked King Louis Philippe, whom it typically depicted as a pear.

== History ==
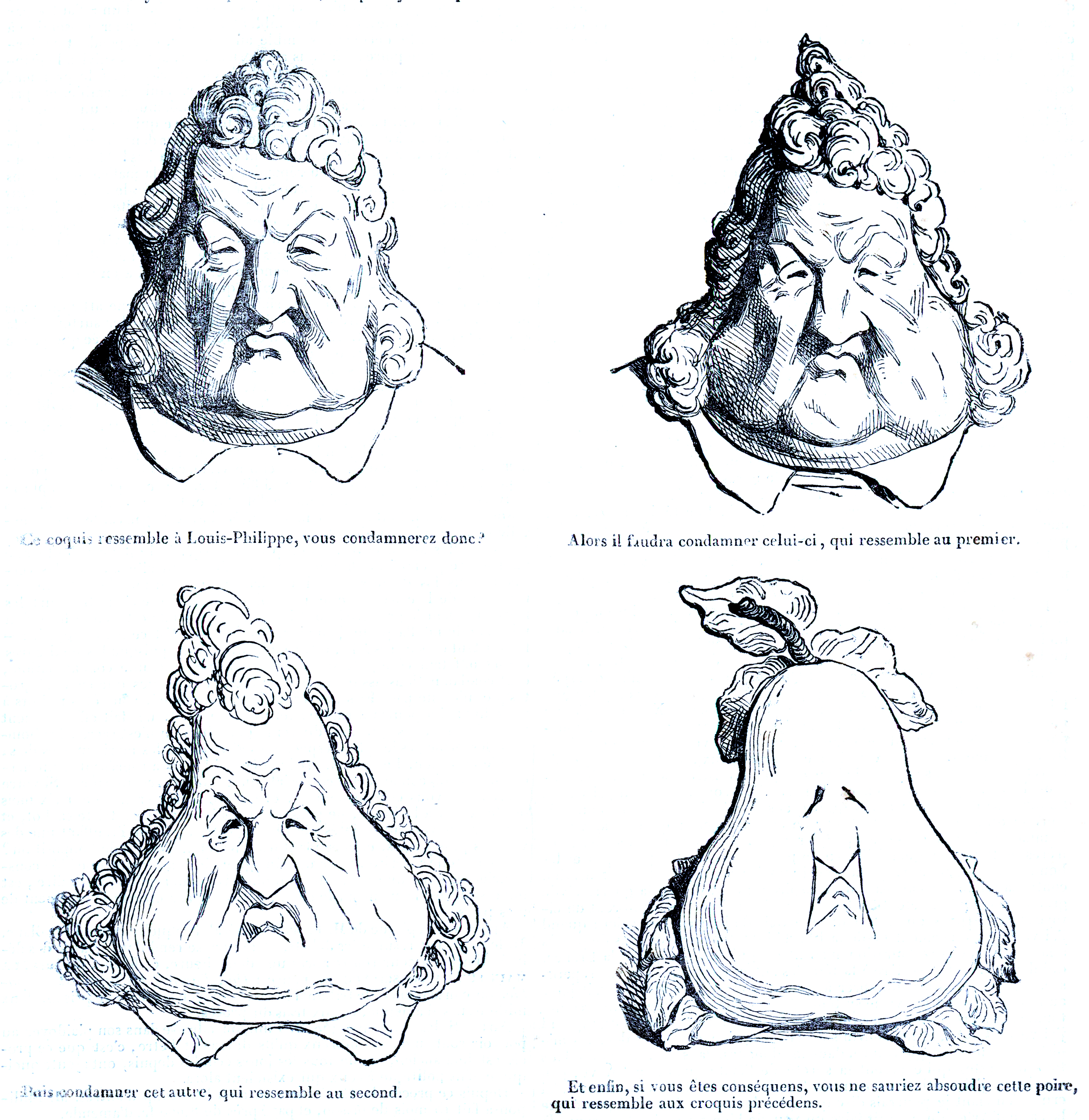
The famous cartoon of Louis Philippe as a pear, drawn by Honoré Daumier after the sketch by Charles Philipon and published in La Caricature in 1831

La Caricature morale, politique et littéraire was published from 1830 to 1843. Auguste Audibert was editor and Charles Philipon (1800–1861) was director and main author. Honoré de Balzac and Louis Desnoyers assisted Philipon in writing some of the magazines issues. Primary artists were Honoré Daumier and Jean Ignace Isidore Gérard Grandville with caricature contributions from many artists including Henry Monnier, Alexandre Decamps, Auguste Raffet, Paul Gavarni, Achille Devéria, Auguste Desperret, Eugène Forest, Benjamin Roubaud. The journal was founded after the censorship laws had been relaxed following the July Revolution of 1830 in which Louis Philippe came to power. It covered both politics and art. 251 issues appeared between 1830 and 1835, each of four pages, with two or three lithographs.

Philipon was the owner of the largest printing house in Paris equipped with lithographic presses, and used them to print La Caricature and Le Charivari, another illustrated paper. He drew together a group of skilled artists who mostly worked for these two papers, through which they attacked the king and the system of government with growing violence. The major contributors were Honoré Daumier (1808–1879) and Jean Ignace Isidore Gérard Grandville (1803–1847), but there were many others. For example, a caricature by Jules David appeared in La Caricature of 31 May 1831. The king is depicted as an illusionist who uses the juste milieu and some poudre de non-intervention to make liberty and revolution vanish.

In 1830–31 there were revolutionary uprisings in Italy. The Austrians intervened to suppress the revolts, and the French did nothing to prevent them. The Pope broke his promise to grant the rebels in the Papal States an amnesty. La Caricature published a cartoon that showed the Pope on his throne surrounded by corpses. Similarly, Philipon published cartoons that associated the French government with that of Tsar Nicholas I when Russia suppressed a revolt in Poland. The fall of Warsaw was announced by Horace Sebastiani, the French foreign minister, as "L'ordre règne à Varsovie" (Order reigns in Warsaw). The phrase was used as a caption for one of the cartoons.

The journal became increasingly vocal in its opposition to Louis-Philippe, and was seized more than twelve times. The publishers were prosecuted, and Philipon was jailed for a year. In 1835 the government passed legislation that forced La Caricature to cease publication. The journal began publication again in 1838 and continued until 1843. Writing in 1840, William Makepeace Thackeray talked of the "curious contest between the State and M. Philipon's little army." Thackery wrote,

Half-a-dozen poor artists on the one side, and his Majesty Louis-Philippe, his august family, and the numberless placemen and supporters of his monarchy, on the other.... The King of the French suffered so much, his ministers were so mercilessly ridiculed, his family and his own remarkable figure drawn with such odious and grotesque resemblance, in fanciful attitudes, circumstances, and disguises, so ludicrously mean, and so often appropriate, that the King was obliged to descend into the lists and battle his ridiculous enemies in form.

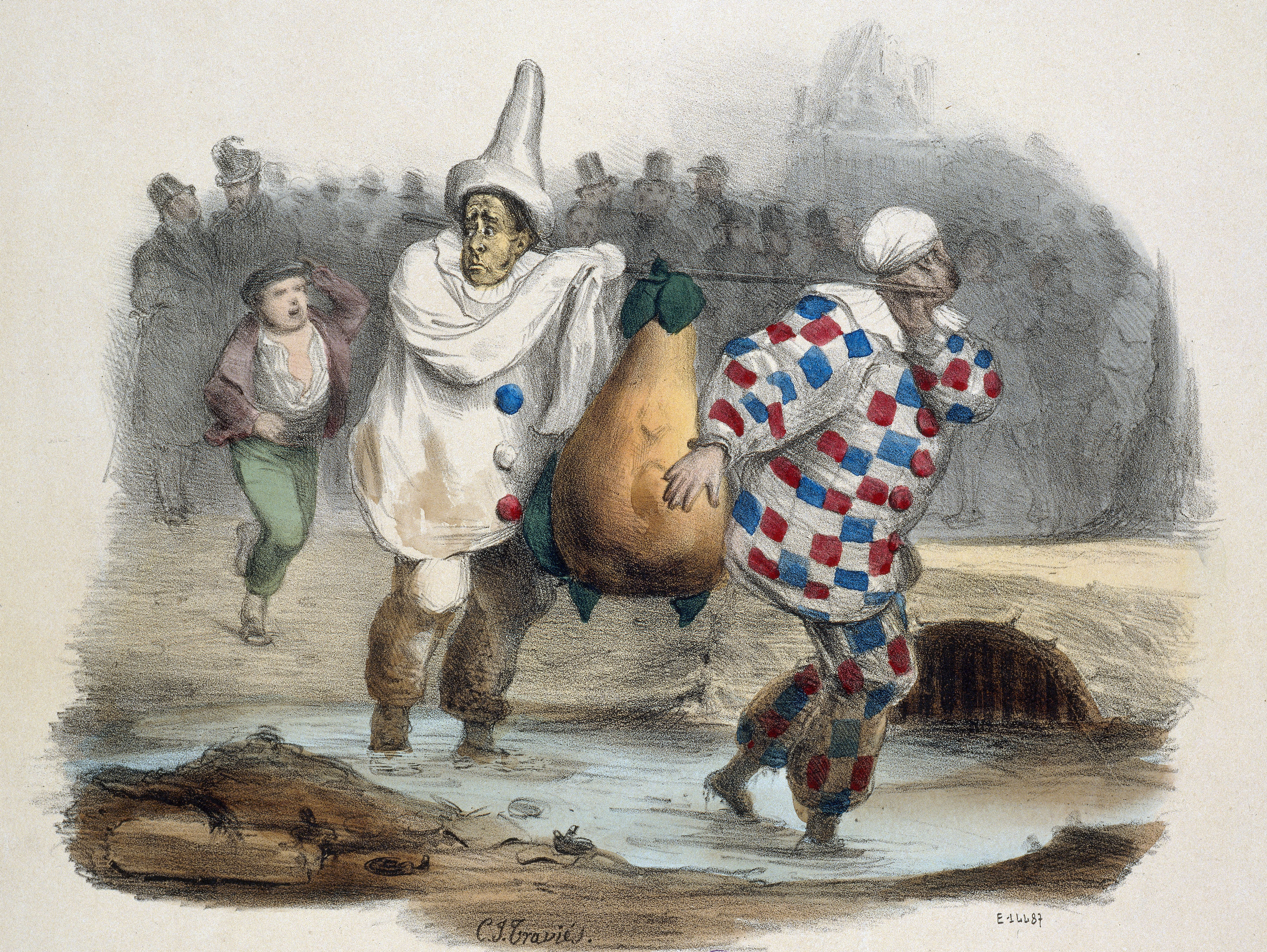
Le juste milieu se crotte by Traviès de Villers

== Contributors ==
=== Illustrations ===
Drawings and lithographies were contributed by the following artists, among others:

- Victor Adam
- Hippolyte Bellangé
- Nicolas Toussaint Charlet
- Honoré Daumier
- Jules David
- Alexandre-Gabriel Decamps
- Auguste Desperret (or Desperet)
- Achille Devéria
- Eugène Forest
- Paul Gavarni
- Jean Ignace Isidore Gérard Grandville
- Henry Monnier
- Charles Philipon
- Clément Pruche
- Auguste Raffet
- Benjamin Roubaud
- Charles-Joseph Traviès de Villers

=== Articles ===
Some of the authors of articles were:

- Agénor Altaroche
- Auguste Audibert
- Honoré de Balzac
- Louis Desnoyers
- Louis Adrien Huart
- Charles Philipon
