= Charles Philipon =

French journalist and artist (1800–1862)

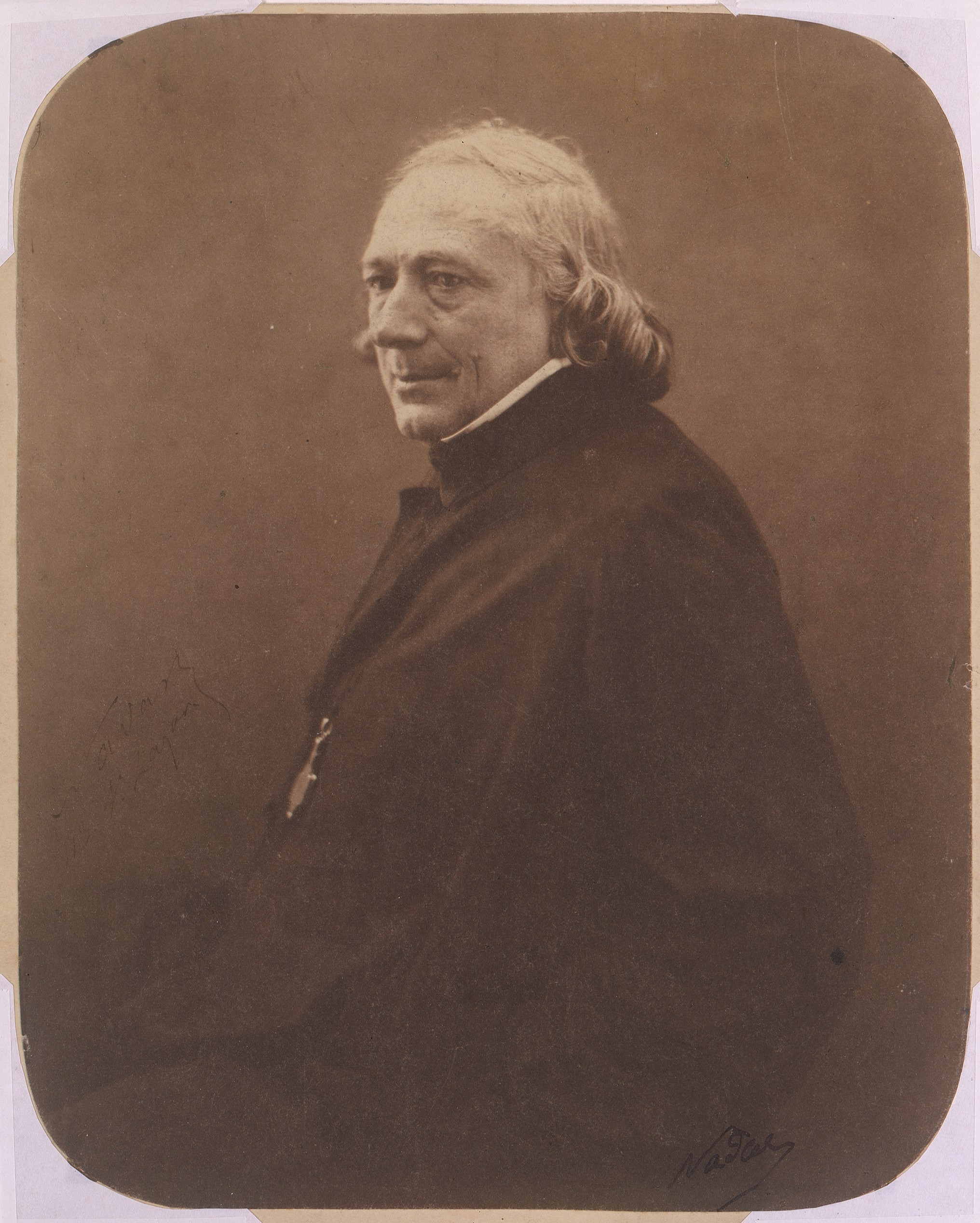
- Charles Philipon by Nadar
- Born: Claude Charles Guillaume Philipon; 19 April 1800; Lyon, France
- Died: 25 January 1861 (aged 60); Paris
- Education: École nationale supérieure des beaux-arts de Lyon
- Known for: Designer, journalist, caricaturist, lithographer, entrepreneur, painter Illustration, graphics/graphic arts

Signature
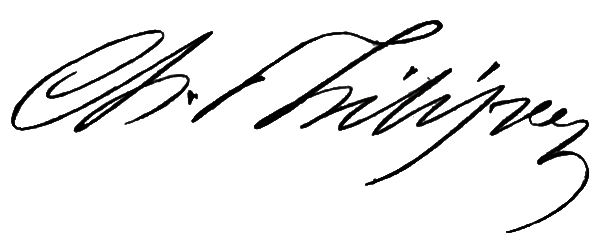

Charles Philipon (19 April 1800 – 26 January 1862) was a French lithographer, caricaturist and journalist. He was the founder and director of the satirical political journals La Caricature and of Le Charivari.

== Early life ==
Charles Philipon came from a small, middle-class, Lyons family. His father, Étienne Philipon, was a hatter and wallpaper manufacturer. He enthusiastically welcomed the revolution of 1789. According to Pierre Larousse his ancestors included Manon Roland, Armand Philippon, and Louis Philipon de La Madelaine.

After attending school in Lyons and Villefranche-sur-Saône, Charles Philipon studied drawing at the École nationale supérieure des beaux-arts de Lyon. He left his hometown in 1819 to work under the artist Antoine Gros in Paris but returned at his father's behest in 1821 to join the family business, designing fabric for three years. Though this activity did not suit him, it left its mark on his subsequent work. During hard economic and social times in 1824, he took part in a Lyons carnival parade that was deemed seditious; he was arrested, but ultimately charges were dropped.

Charles Philipon finally left Lyon for Paris where he reunited with old friends from the workshop Gros. One of them, Nicolas Toussaint Charlet, a renowned artist, took him under his wing and introduced him to lithography, a technique spreading in France in the 1820s. Philipon found employment as a lithographer and artist drawing for picture books and fashion magazines. He showed invention by converting a lead chimney to a lithographic machine. He bonded with the liberals and satirists of the day, attended the Grandville workshop (1827), and two years later joined forces with the creators of the newspaper La Silhouette, on which he worked as an editor and designer.

While Philipon's financial contribution to the company was small, his editorial contribution seems to have focused on the organisation of the lithographic department, which gave the paper its originality inasmuch as the same importance was given to the illustration as to the text. Whereas La Silhouette previously had no definite political line, by July 1830 it had developed a more aggressive approach. It is in this journal that on 1 April 1830, Philipon published the first political cartoon, " Charles X Jesuit ."

On 15 December 1829 Philipon sent his son and business partner, Gabriel Aubert, to set up the Aubert publishing house Aubert, competing with other printing shops in Paris. The Veronique Dodat pass, where the publishing house could be found, was to become in the following years a "place of breathtaking [commercial] war" (Ch. Lèdre).

== Birth of a business ==
After the revolution of July 1830, Philipon published on 4 November that year an illustrated weekly under the title La Caricature. Sold by subscription only, it had four pages of text and two lithographies in a larger format than that of Silhouette. Associated with the creation of Philipon newspaper, Honoré de Balzac wrote in the prospectus and gave it under various pseudonyms thirty articles until February 1832. The journal was primarily designed as an elegant illustrated magazine, with the drawings printed on vellum paper. The lithographs were printed on separate text and tear sheets. At first, La Caricature adopted a non-political attitude before coming to oppose July Monarchy in the spring of 1832.

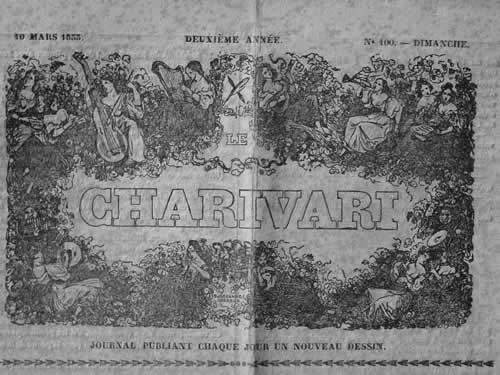
Page de titre du Charivari, 1833

On 1 December 1832, while imprisoned, Philipon published Le Charivari, an illustrated daily with four pages in a smaller than Caricature format. More varied and more "popular" than its predecessor, it was not limited to political caricature. Charivari was the only daily caricature journal of nineteenth-century France. According to the prospectus, Charivari was intended as "comprehensive overview of all the constantly recurring events, by pencil and pen, of all the various aspects of this kaleidoscopic world in which we live." The lithographs are of lower quality than in La Caricature, but better integrated into the text. Thereafter, the presentation of Charivari changed significantly.

As the owner of these two newspapers, Philipon retained full control of all aspects of the papers' written and lithographic content.

He chooses his collaborators, dealing with suppliers in the market as well as financial management. In an obituary published in 1862, Nadar the credits of "extraordinary lucidity in business" coupled with "inexhaustible fertility of invention and means". Employer of his artist friends, it defines the objectives with them, suggest topics, coordinating text and lithography. He does not hesitate to ask for changes to avoid censorship. To ensure editorial consistency, writing is reduced to a small team of highly dedicated journalists (in February 1834, they are seven Philipon included).

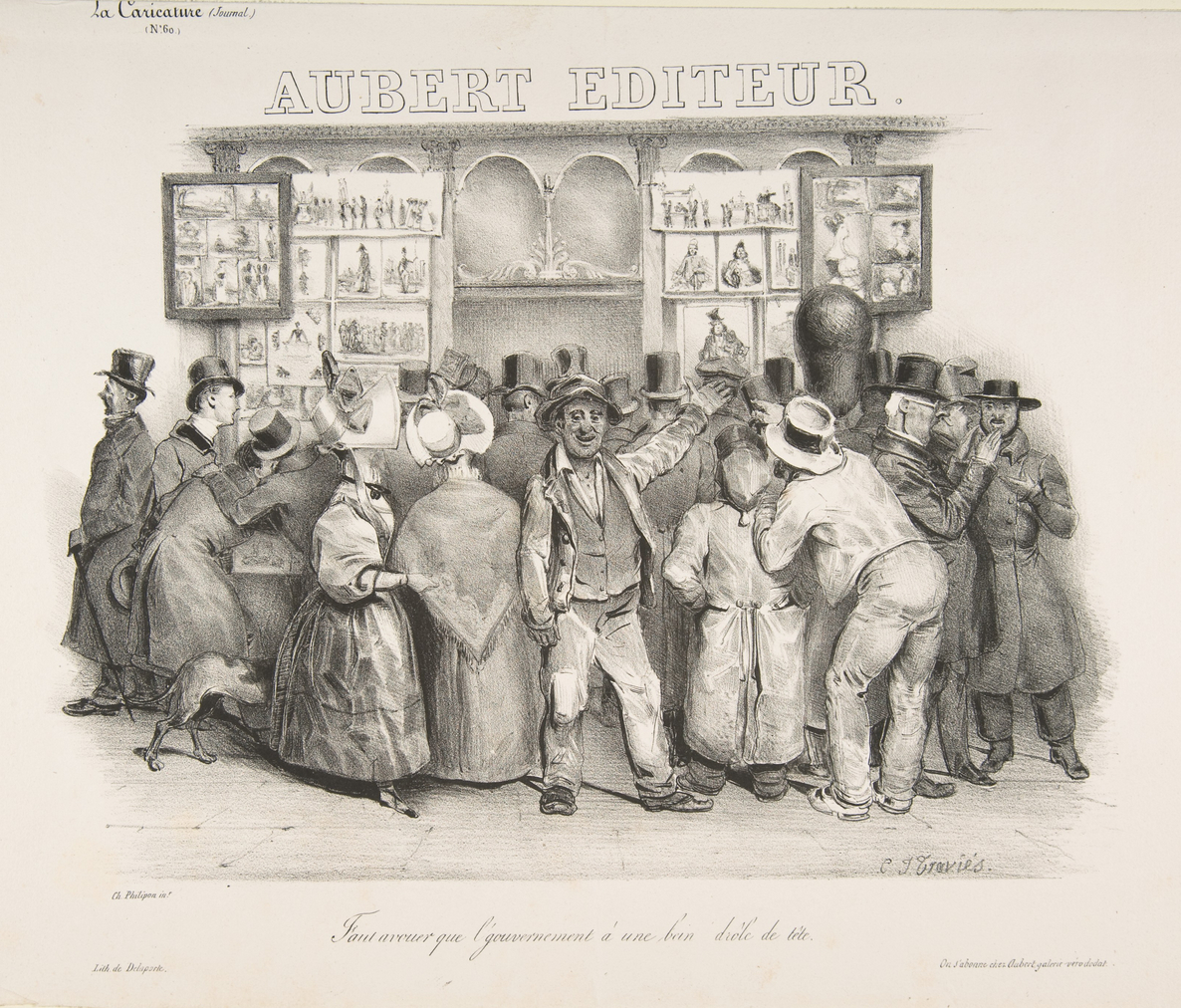
La Maison Aubert (1831)

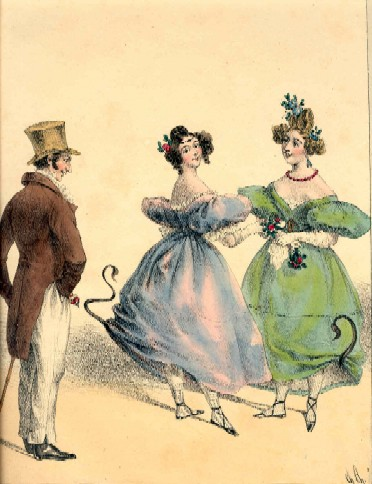
Les tentations du diable (1830)

The testimony of his contemporaries emphasises Philipon's charisma who inspired writers and caricaturists in his employ. Himself focusing on lithographs, his publishing house had an almost complete monopoly on this type of publication as of 1831, with a third of all lithographs published in Paris coming from him.

== Rise to prominence (1830–1835) ==
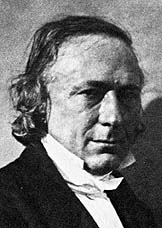
Charles Philipon

=== Campaign against Louis-Philippe (1830–1832) ===
In the fall of 1830 Philipon, as supporter of the Revolution of July, expected much of the new regime. The first issues of La Caricature contained no political charges. Chief editor and friend of Philipon, Balzac, contributed extensively in this period, signing his articles under various pseudonyms. Anti-clericalism, already present in La Silhouette, persistently manifested itself in both texts and illustrations. The memory of Napoleon still lived.

However, the tone changed in late December 1830 to early 1831, when the law of 4 December 1830 that restored stamp duty and censorship of newspapers was criticised by the magazine. The caricatures then maintained their political and satirical character as the new regime became increasingly authoritarian, upending the "age of consensus." According to Philipon, caricatures increased the important influence of artists, as had been the case in England for a long time, exposing "the enemies of our liberties."

Philipon expressed his disaffection for the regime in a cartoon, Foam of July, published by Maison Aubert (26 February 1831). Better known as The soap bubbles, it shows Louis Philippe I carelessly blowing bubbles that show the unfulfilled promises of freedom of the press, popular elections, mayors elected by the people, no more sinecures etc. Prosecuted for insulting the king, Philipon would be acquitted eventually. He reoffended a few months later with another lithograph, known as The Cosmetic repair (La Caricature, 30 June 1831), in which the king is represented as a mason, symbolically erasing the traces of the July Revolution. He was again tried by the Assize Court.

=== November 1831 trial ===
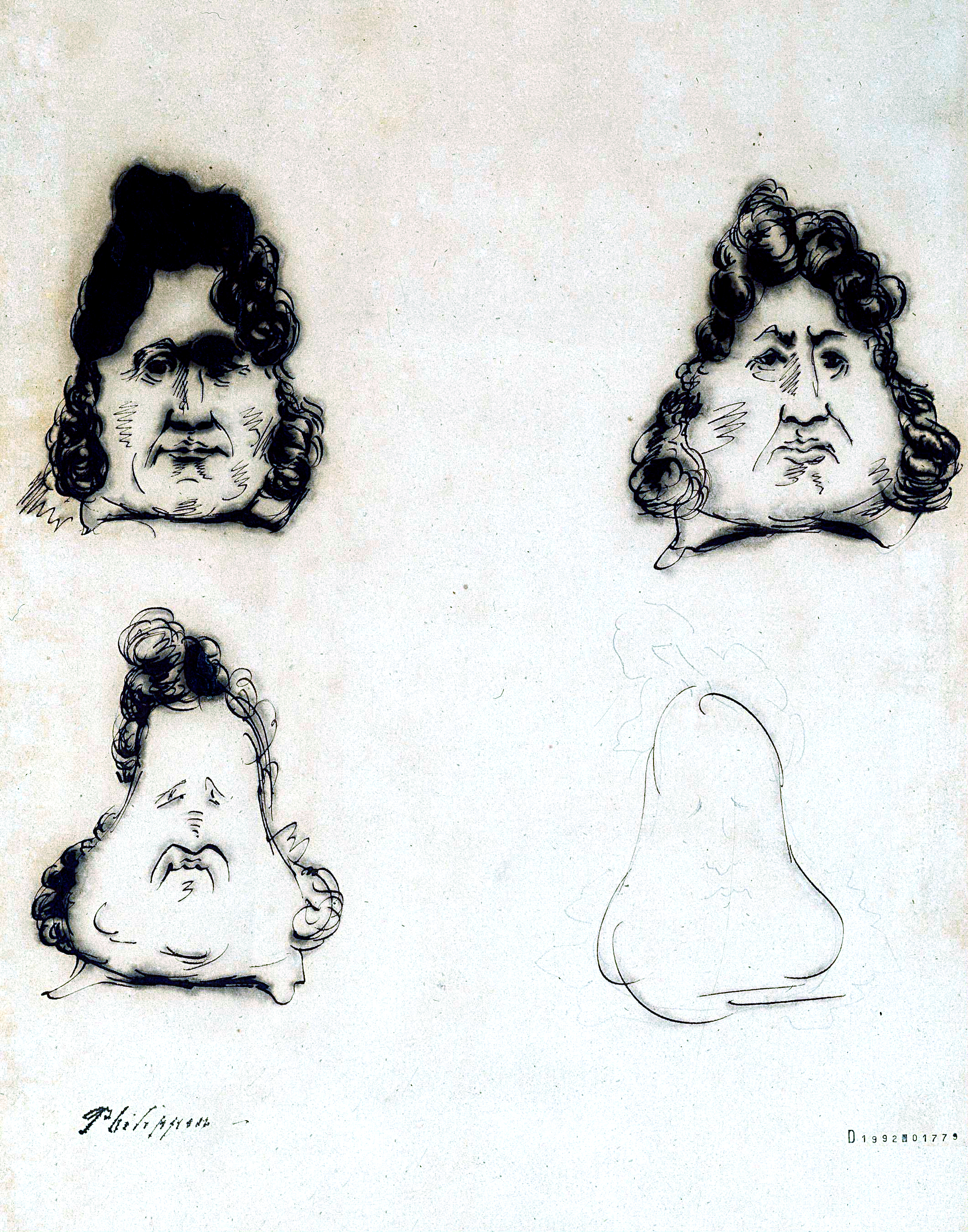
Louis-Philippe transformed into pear

==== "First fruit of France" ====
On trial on 14 November 1831, Philipon, sure to be condemned, defended himself arguing that everything can be made to look like the king, and that he and other caricaturists cannot be held responsible for this resemblance. He illustrated its defense by the metamorphosis by drawing, in four stages, the King's face evolving into a pear. This imagery became a widely used reference and symbol of the revolution, even outside of Paris.

The widespread appearance of the pears is well documented by a vast array of people of the times, including William Makepeace Thackeray, Heinrich Heine, Charles Baudelaire, Stendhal, and Sebastien Peyte, who wrote a book titled Physiology of the Pear, collecting puns and spin-offs of the imagery. Victor Hugo in Les Misérables pays homage to the imagery as a young boy sketches an image of a pear on a wall, when the king helped him finish it and handed him a gold Louis coin saying, "The pear is on that too."

Pears began to represent the regime and its associates, and began showing up more often in both La Caricature and Le Charivari including,

- Daumier's A huge pear hanging by the commoners
- Grandville's The Birth of the Juste- Milieu
- Travies' Mr. Mahieux poiricide
- Bouquet's Pear and pips

Philipon later published an image of a giant pear statue being erected at the Place de la Concorde with the title "The expiapoire monument is raised on the site of the Revolution, exactly where Louis XVI was guillotined." Expiapoire is a portmanteau of expiatoire meaning "expiatory" and poire meaning "pear". He was tried for this piece and the prosecution called this piece "a provocation of murder". Philipon responded with, "It would be at most a provocation to make marmalade".

Doomed for closing in August after a censorship law was passed in 1835, La Caricature published the relevant portion of the law's text in the shape of a pear with the legend "Other fruits of the July Revolution".

==== Conviction ====
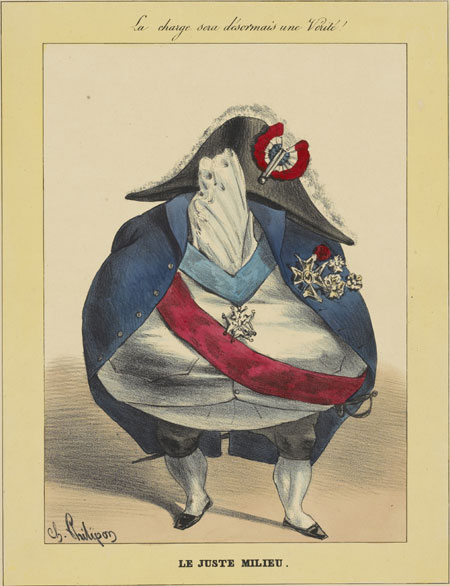
Cartoon representing the juste milieu philosophy as an empty suit of clothes.

At the end of his trial before the Assize Court, Philipon was convicted of "contempt of the king's person." Arrested on 12 January 1832, he had to serve six months in prison and pay a fine of 2,000 francs, to which were added seven months related to other charges.

The final break with the July Monarchy occurred on 5 and 6 June 1832, at the funeral of General Lamarque, which turned into rebellion harshly repressed. Philipon had just published and signed the "Project for a monument pear Atonement." Fearing for his life, he hid in Paris until the end of the siege. He returned to Sainte-Pelagie on 5 September 1832 and was finally released from prison on 5 February 1833.

Resulting from the bitterness of a regime that "persecuted" him, along with the influence of contacts he met in prison, his positions had firmed. After he had hoped for a "liberalism compatible with monarchy", his position became Republican in itself. But he had never ceased to be ? Philipon proclamation published in La Caricature (27 December 1832), true profession of faith, leaves no doubt about it: " We repeat, we are what we were there twelve years, frank and pure republicans . Who says otherwise is an impostor who says behind us in ambiguous terms is a coward. "

=== Republican commitment (1833–1835) ===
At the time of his first political cartoons, Philipon had already established contacts with Republican circles. A number of artists who gathered around him were of republican conviction, or at least sympathisers. From November 1831 to March 1832, a list of subscriptions was launched from La Caricature, a second call being made a year later in Le Charivari without much success, the economic situation there is hardly suitable . From 1833 to tighten the links. In La Caricature on 11 April that year, Philipon publishes Bluebeard, white and red by Grandville and Desperet, an openly militant lithography. The advent of the republic is announced in the manner of a tale by Perrault : "The press, my sister, do you see anything coming?". While Louis -Philippe, back ( a subterfuge designed to avoid censorship ), is about to stab the constitution, the herald symbolizing the press carries on its banner the word " Republic " and his trumpet and National Tribune, title two newspapers of the Republican opposition.

In 1834, these links were strengthened. To keep a few examples, Le Charivari made fundraising for several republican associations. The same year, Philipon was among the founders of the Republican Journal (February 1834), in which he owned shares. At the Hotel Colbert where offices are located Charivari, two Republican newspapers, The National and The Common sense will also have their neighborhood. This is where stood Gregory, the most prominent Republican printer Paris, which Aubert and Philipon associated as shareholders.

These expressions of solidarity are reflected in the lithographs in which the figure of the proletariat is at the center of several caricatures : Ouch therefore proletarian ! by Benjamin Roubaud ( Le Charivari, 1 December 1833) and Do not rub it ! Daumier, published in Monthly Association (20 June 1834), a supplement created by Philipon to train, by voluntary subscription, a reserve fund . In this lithograph, considered by Philipon as "one of the best political sketches made in France", a typographer full force at the forefront defies away frail figures of Louis-Philippe and Charles X. However, Philipon remain a Republican "patriot" in the tradition of 1789, more sensitive to political freedom only if the working masses.

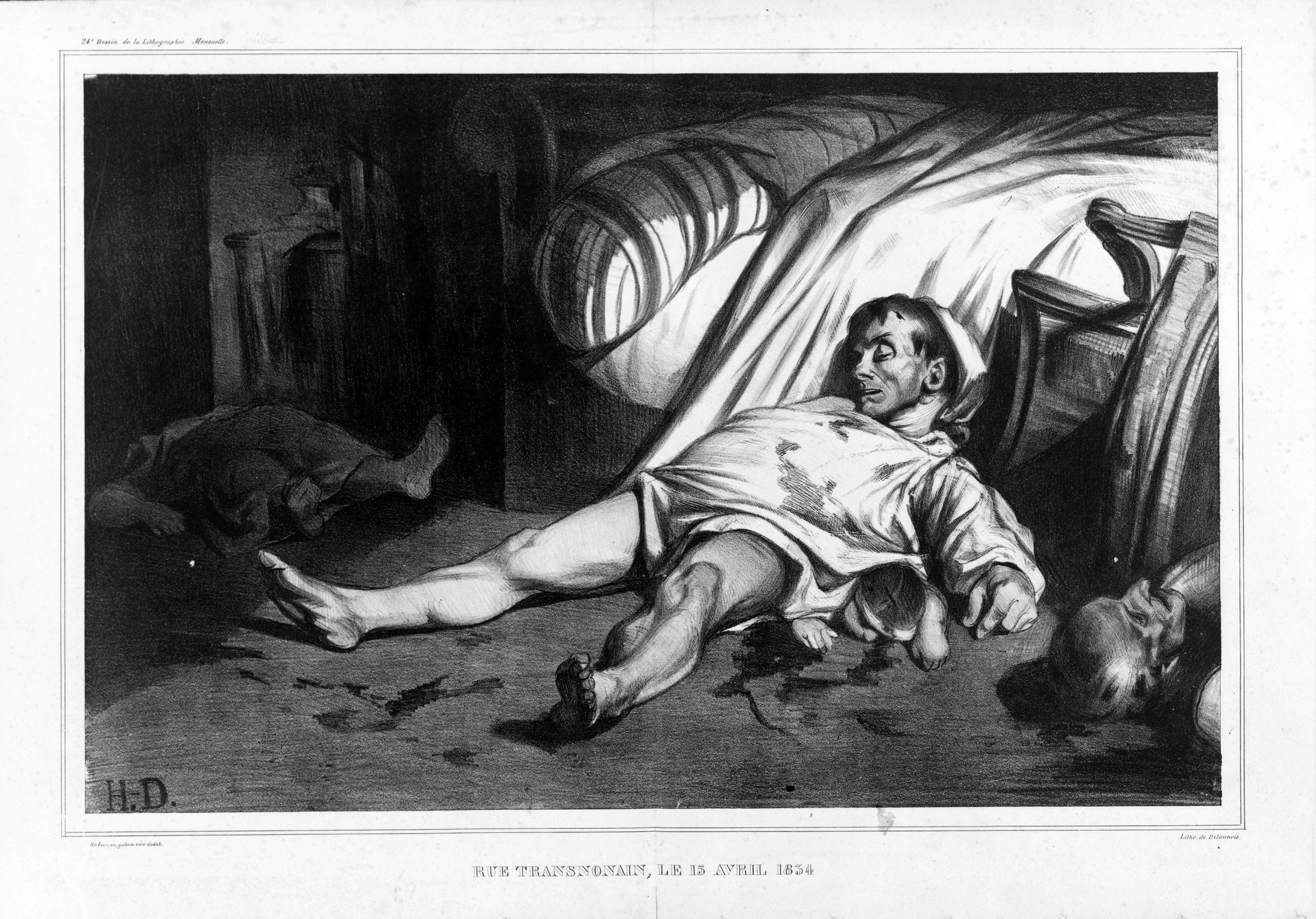
Le massacre de la rue Transnonain (14 avril 1834), by Honoré Daumier

Commitment cannot be denied, the uprisings harshly repressed Lyon (9 April) and Paris (13 April). Several lithographs emerged, including Hercules winner Travies (La Caricature, 1 May 1834) and especially Rue Transnonain Daumier (Monthly Association, 24 September 1834), which refers to the killing by troops of the inhabitants of this street 15 April 1834. "This is not a caricature ," says Philipon, " it is not a burden, it's a bloody page of our modern history page drawn by a strong hand and dictated by an old indignation " (La Caricature, 2 October 1834).

On 28 July 1835 the bombing of Fieschi had immediate consequences : the arrest of Armand Carrel at the Hotel Colbert, ransacking offices Charivari, an arrest warrant was issued against Philipon and that Desnoyers preferred to escape and hide. The day before the attack, had published Philipon red number Charivari, real firebrand with as an article a list of men, women and children killed by the troops and the National Guard since 1830. He was accompanied by a lithograph Travies ironically titled " Personification of the sweetest and most humane system " (Le Charivari, 27 July 1835), in which the body of the murdered "patriots" formed an image of Louis-Philippe back. Philipon wa accused of "moral complicity" in the attack.

On 5 August 1835, new press laws are presented in the House. At the meeting of 29 August Thiers said, " There is nothing more dangerous [...] that infamous caricatures, seditious designs, there is no more direct provocation to attack " (The universal monitor, 30 August 1835). Caricature ceased publication. In November 1835, Le Charivari was sold for a pittance, but Philipon canned Officer until 1838. Taking stock of five years, he wrote : "I started on 4 November 1830 the country's liberal illusions and I arrived in September 1835 in the kingdom of the saddest realities".

=== From political cartoon to satire of manners (after 1835) ===
If the " September Laws " mark the end of the political cartoon in his " vehement " version Philipon not remains active . In addition to the reissue of La Caricature Caricature became Provisional (1838), also called " non-political cartoon ," he published in Le Charivari series Robert Macaire (1836–1838), the Museum to laugh designs for all cartoonists Paris (1839–1840), the Museum or comic store Philipon (1843), Paris comic (1844), Le Journal pour rire (1848–1855), became the fun Journal (1856), where the proceeds essentially comic satire manners .

The purpose of this "library for fun " is to distract and entertain through the creation of " social types " representative, the physiologies, very popular with the public. The most emblematic kinds were illustrated in particular by Daumier (Ratapoil, Robert Macaire) Travies (M.Mayeux), Henry Monnier (Joseph Prudhomme) Gavarni (Thomas Vireloque) . Vogue physiologies was conducive to Aubert House: February 1841 to August 1842, she published thirty-two different physiologies representing three quarters of production in this period.

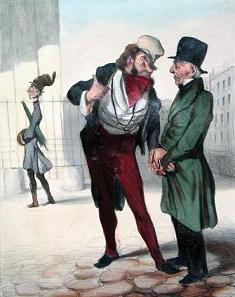
Robert Macaire business agent

However, it is not always easy to disentangle the social satire of political satire. In this regard, the series of Robert Macaire is highly significant. Composed and drawn by Daumier about ideas and legends Philipon, all met in volume under the title Les Cent and Robert Macaire (1839). The large drawings are reduced and accompanied by a comic and narrative written by journalists Maurice Alhoy and Louis Huart. Emphatically presented as an avatar of Don Quixote and Gil Blas, the character of Robert Macaire, in tandem with the naive Bertrand, embodies in its facets and multiple roles a social type characterised by the term " floueur " master diddle all kinds and emblem dominated by the interest and profiteering society (Marx refer to Louis-Philippe as to " Robert Macaire on his throne"). This " high comedy " that offers the company a particularly cynical and ruthless image is reminiscent of the Human Comedy of Balzac, she would somehow pendant for caricature.

In the same period, Philipon published The Floueur (1850), the first series of the Library for fun, the Anglo-French Museum (1855–1857) in collaboration with Gustave Doré, Aux proletarians (with Agénor Altaroche, 1838) and parody wandering Jew (Louis Huart, 1845), inspired by the work of Eugène Sue.

== Significance of caricatures ==
Historian Paul Thureau-Dangin, said of Philipon's destructive influence on the power of the King,

He knew how to group, launch and inspire those artists which he employed, to inoculate them with his gall and his audacity, furnish them with ideas and legends, brave prosecutions and condemnations, and thus this obscure man became one of the most dangerous adversaries of the new king, preventing the monarch from acquiring that prestige required to truly establish himself

In 1835, after an attempt to assassinate Louis Philippe I, an official declared that "there is no more direct provocation for crimes" than caricature. Following the assassination attempt, a new censorship law was implemented, aimed at suppressing further political art from surfacing.

== La Silhouette ==
In October 1829 Philipon launched a career in journalism as a co-founder of La Silhouette. He made a minor financial investment and became a contributor without final editorial control. La Silhouette was the first French newspaper to regularly publish prints and illustrations, giving them equal or greater importance than the written text. Each issue satirised political and literary events of the day and included lithographs by the best-known graphic artists in Paris.

La Silhouette was published from 24 December 1829 to 2 January 1831. It became the prototype for similar publications published in France throughout the 19th century. La Silhouette was initially known as a moderate journal in a time of intense political debate. Some of the staff had been jailed for publishing works critical of the government while others held more conservative views. Over time, the publication's editorial sympathies became increasingly radical.

Strict government censorship prevented La Silhouette from publishing caricatures aimed directly at politicians – except for a small woodcut of the king (Charles X of France) by Philipon that was surreptitiously inserted within the text of 1 April 1830 issue. The newspaper had never included engravings in this way it was overlooked by the censors who were concentrating on the issues' lithographs. The publication caused a scandal – with an intensity that reflected the rarity of political caricature before the Revolution – and the editor was eventually sentenced to six months in prison and fined 1,000 francs. Philipon, who had carefully left the caricature unsigned, escaped the scandal's repercussions.

The censors were circumvented in later issues when the editors wrote bitterly critical partisan commentaries and attached them to seemingly innocuous images. In the May and June issues of 1830, this tactic was used to address a variety of political themes through a series of animal scenes by JJ Grandville (Jean Ignace Isidore Gérard). In an issue that immediately preceded the July Revolution, Honoré Daumier contributed a non-specific battlefield image that was given an explicit political message by an editor.

He was the director of the satirical political newspapers La Caricature and of Le Charivari, which included lithographs by some of France's leading caricaturists such as JJ Grandville (Jean Ignace Isidore Gérard), Honoré Daumier, Paul Gavarni, Charles-Joseph Traviès, Benjamin Roubaud and others. The artists would often illustrate Philipon's themes to create some of France's earliest political cartoons.

He died in Paris at the age of 61.

== Influence ==
Philipon inspired many other caricaturists, such as Honoré Daumier, Charles-Joseph Traviès de Villers, Jean Ignace Isidore Gérard Grandville, Paul Gavarni, and Henry Monnier. Daumier spoke about the effect Philipon had on him, saying, "If Philipon had not been behind me to prod me unceasingly like one does to an ox with a plow, I would never have done anything." Playwright Honoré de Balzac called Philipon the "Duke of Lithograph, Marquis of Drawing, Count of Woodcut, Baron Burlesque, Sir Caricature."

== Gallery ==
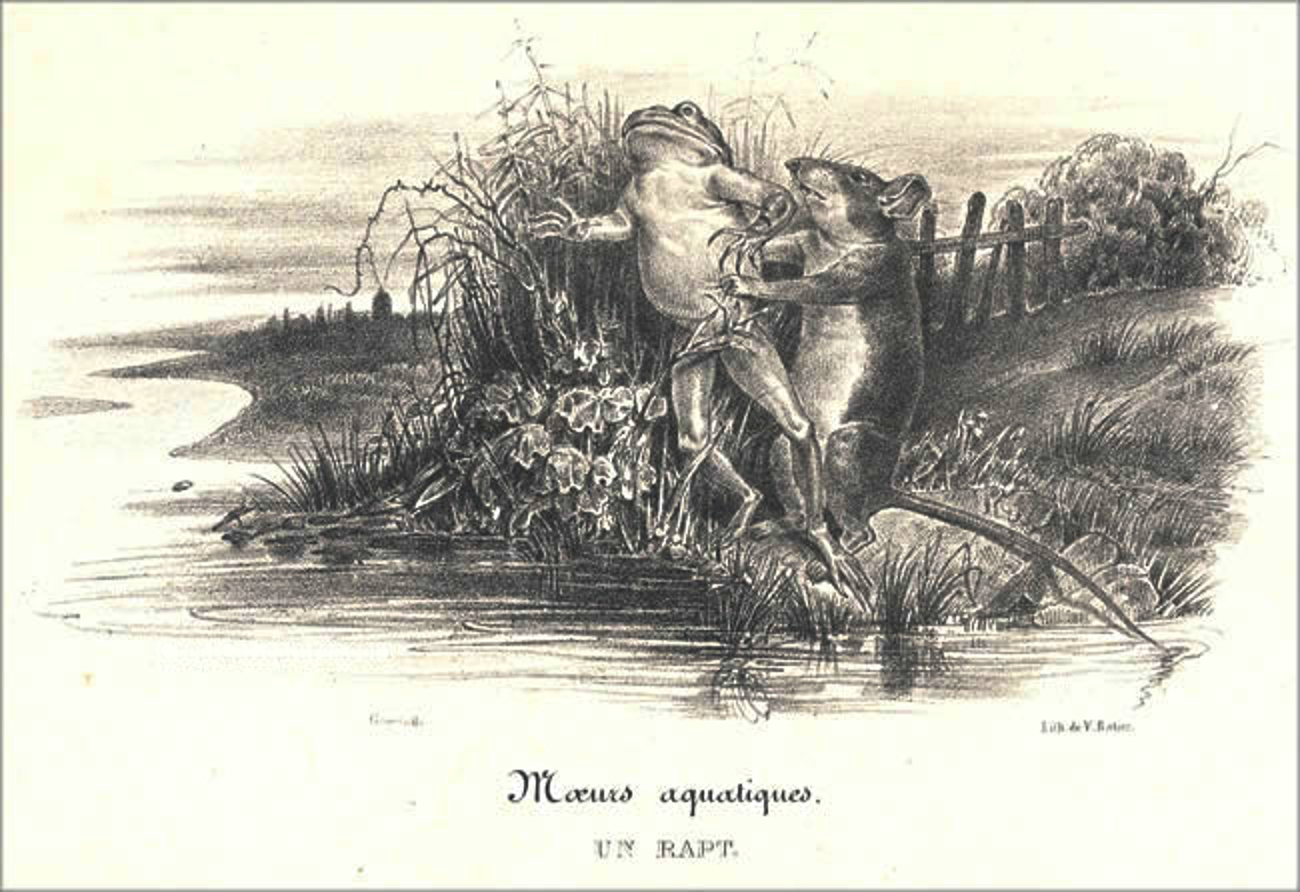
Moeurs Aquatiques. Un Rapt by JJ Grandville (Jean Ignace Isidore Gérard).

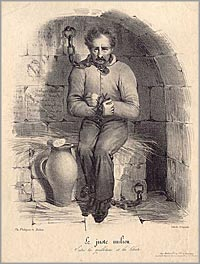
Le juste milieu by Charles Philipon

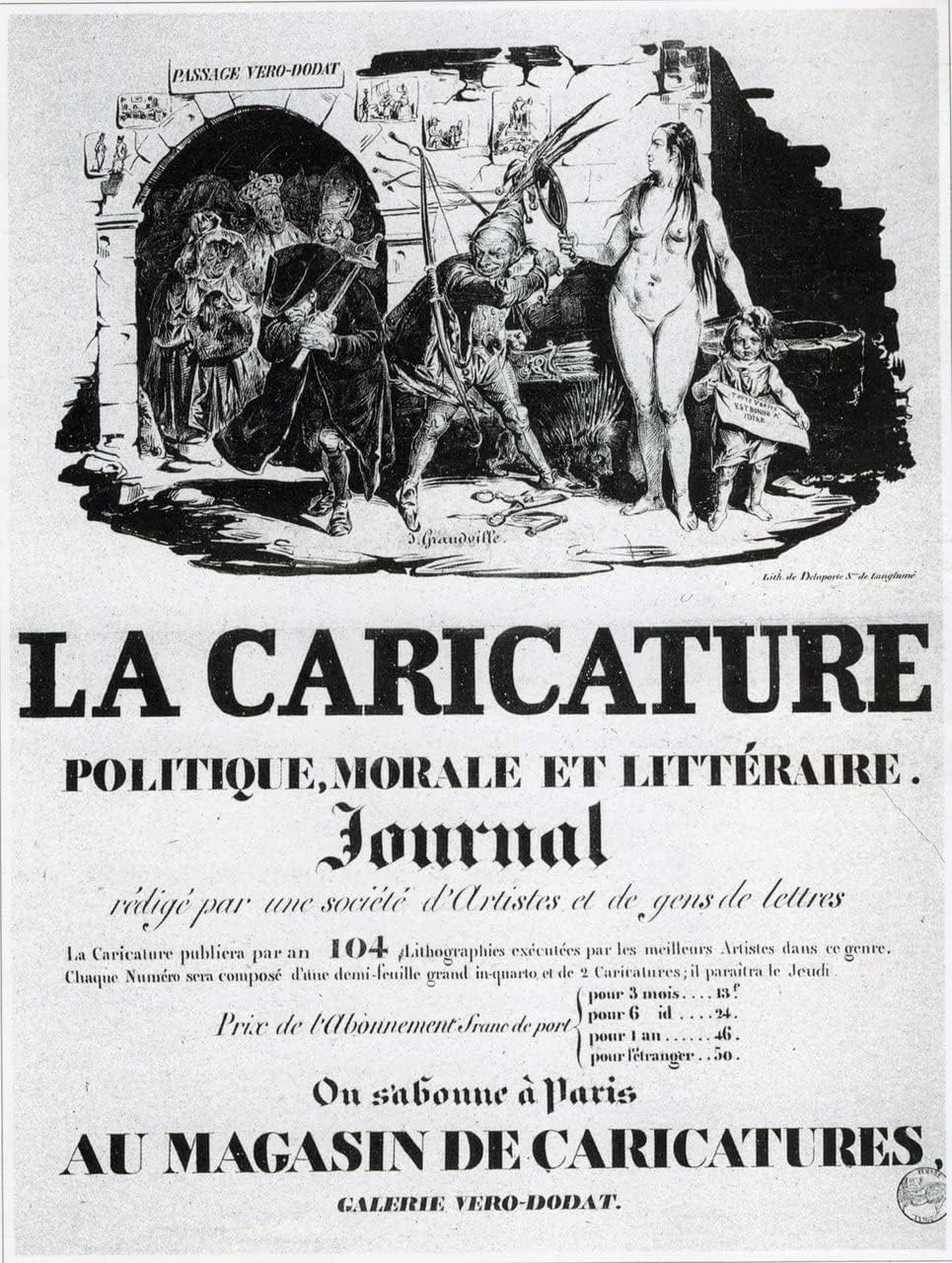
Advertisement for La Caricature, Politique, Morale et Littéraire Journal. Illustration by JJ Grandville (Jean Ignace Isidore Gérard).

== See also ==
- 19th-century French art
- List of French artists
- Freedom of the press
- Media regulation
- The press in Paris during the Bourbon Restoration
- The September 1835 laws
- Pear (caricature)
