= Amédée de Noé =

French caricaturist and lithographer

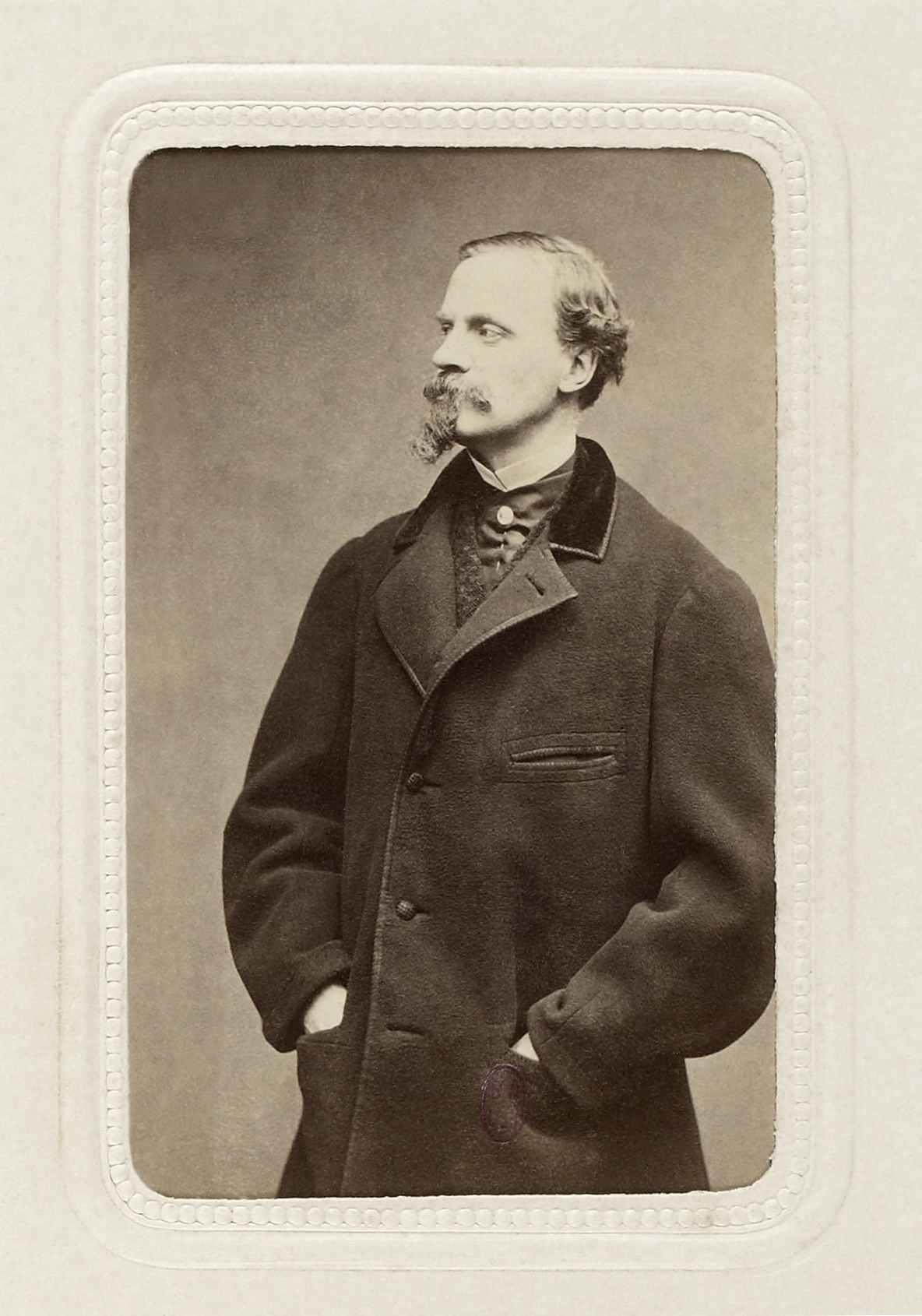
French illustrator and caricaturist Amédée de Noé a.k.a. Cham (1818–1879)

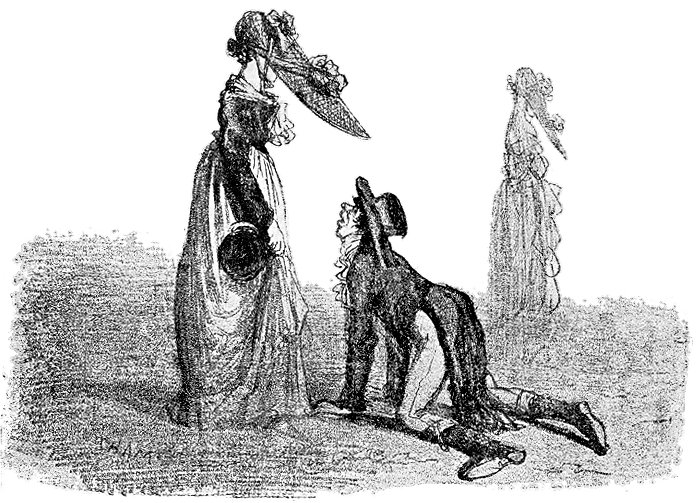
A Cham satire on women's fashions

Charles Amédée de Noé, known as Cham (26 January 1818 – 6 September 1879), was a French caricaturist and lithographer.

== Life and career ==
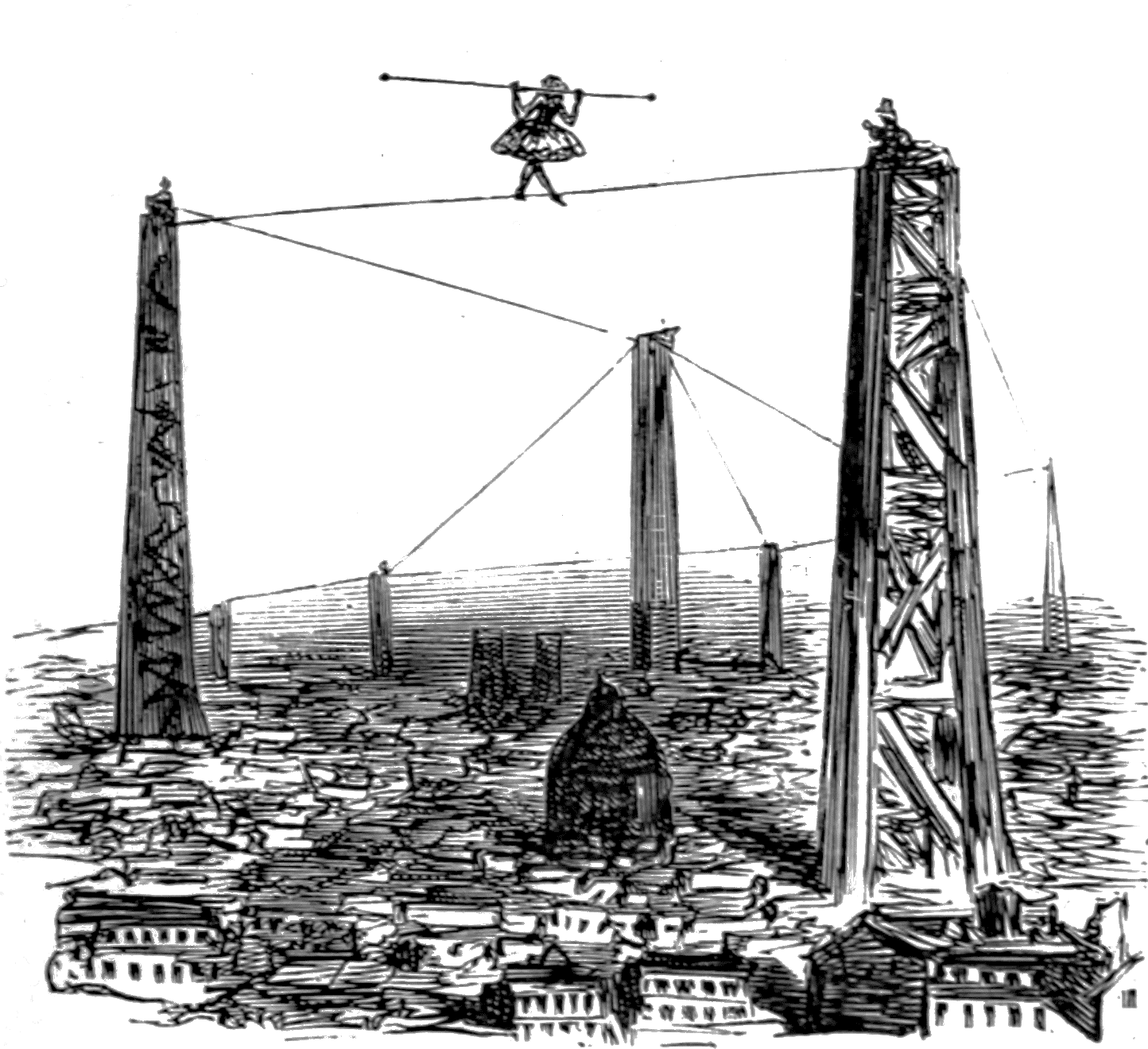
A satirical cartoon by Cham captioned "Madame Saqui was responsible for putting the surveyors in touch with each other during the triangulation operation". Published in Charivari - Vol 6

Charles Amédée de Noé was born in Paris and raised by a family who wished him to attend a polytechnic school.

Instead, he attended painting workshops hosted by Nicolas Charlet and Paul Delaroche and began work as a cartoonist. He eventually took up the pseudonym of "Cham".

In 1839, he published his first book, Monsieur Lajaunisse, which began a career that produced 40,000 drawings. In 1843, he began to have his illustrations published in newspapers like Le Charivari, a publication where he was on staff for 30 years.

Later works included Proudhon en voyage and Histoire comique de l'Assemblée Nationale. He wrote a number of comic plays towards the end of his life.

He died in Paris in 1879.

== Depiction of people of colour ==
A 2015 article in The Art Bulletin on the late 19th century entry of blacks, specifically black women, into France's economy of wage labor, and their depiction in the art of that period, included criticism of Cham's racist portrayal of French people of colour, noting that "there is a virulent racism consistently running through Cham's work: he was the grandson of the comte de Noé, the former owner of Haitian revolutionary hero Toussaint Louverture". One example is his caricature of the mixed-race author Alexandre Dumas cross-dressed like a wet nurse, which was a popular profession for black women in the post-slavery era in 19th-century France. In a different caricature, he referred to the gift of the milk of a black wet-nurse as mistaken by the recipient for "shoe polish".
