= Édouard Traviès =

French watercolourist, lithographer and illustrator

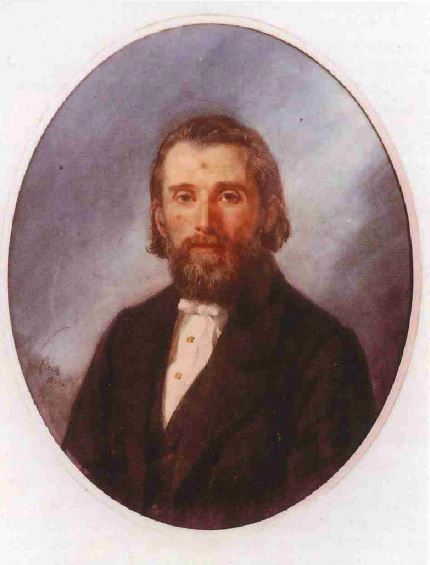
Edouard Travies painted by Fink in the year 1859 at Musée Lombart in Doullens

Édouard Traviès de Villers (24 March 1809 – 18 November 1876) was a French watercolourist, lithographer and illustrator. He regularly exhibited works at the Paris Salon between 1831 and 1866 and was primarily known for his paintings of natural history subjects, especially birds. His greatest work was Les oiseaux les plus remarquables par leurs formes et leurs couleurs (The most remarkable birds for their form and colour). Simultaneously published in London and Paris in 1857, Les oiseaux contains 79 hand-colored lithographic plates made from Traviès's original paintings. His elder brother was the painter and caricaturist Charles-Joseph Traviès de Villers.
