= Le Charivari =

French satirical magazine

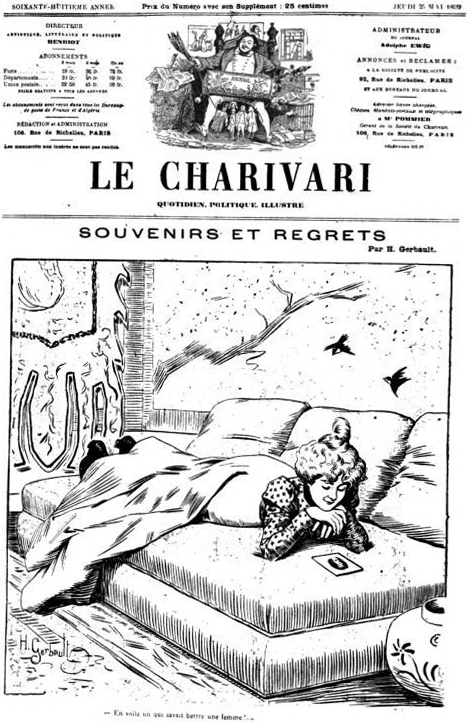
- Masthead of Le Charivari in 1833, during its second year of publication.
- Categories: Humor magazine
- Founder: Charles Philipon
- First issue: 1 December 1832
- Final issue: 1937
- Based in: Paris, France
- Language: French

Le Charivari was an illustrated magazine published in Paris, France, from 1832 to 1937. It published caricatures, political cartoons and reviews. After 1835, when the government banned political caricature, Le Charivari began publishing satires of everyday life. The name refers to the folk practice of holding a charivari, a loud, riotous parade, to shame or punish wrongdoers.

== History and profile ==
Le Charivari was started by caricaturist Charles Philipon and his brother-in-law Gabriel Aubert to reduce their financial risk of censorship fines. They also published the satirical, anti-monarchist, illustrated newspaper La Caricature, which had more pages and was printed on more expensive paper. In Le Charivari, they featured humorous content which was not so political. Ownership of the paper changed often due to issues with government censorship, as well as related taxes and fines.

Le Charivari was published daily from 1832 to 1936, and then weekly until 1937.

In 1841, British wood-engraver Ebenezer Landells and Henry Mayhew used Le Charivari as the model to establish their Punch magazine, subtitled The London Charivari.

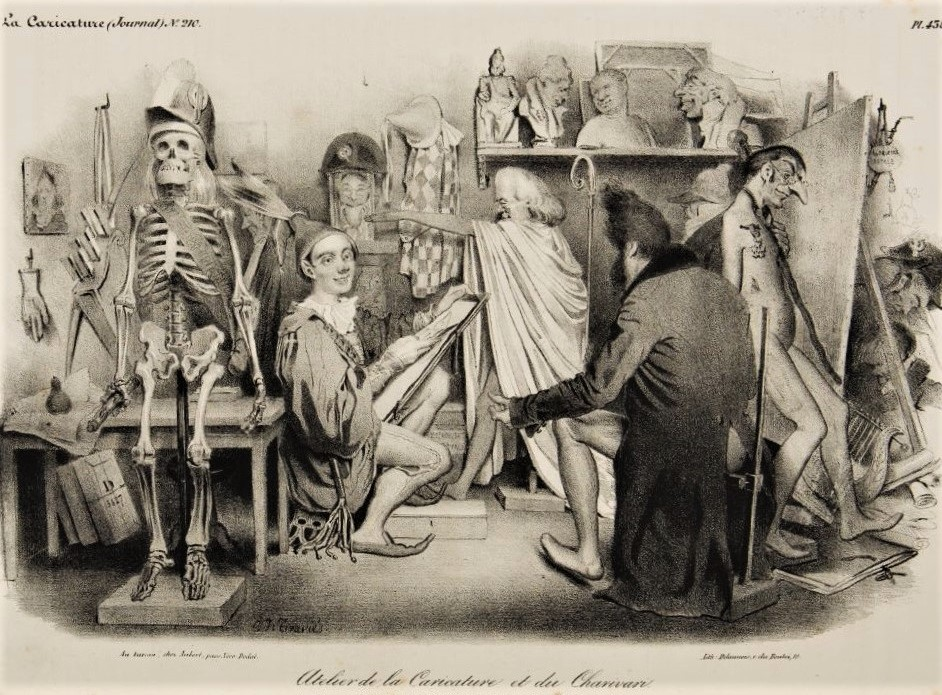
Atelier de la Caricature et du Charivari by Charles-Joseph Traviès de Villers depicts the studio of La Caricature and Charivari after the two publications merged. The harlequin is drawing a caricature of King Louis Philippe, whose back is turned to the onlooker.

== Selected contributing artists ==
Contributing with lithographs, woodcuts, and (after 1870) with zincographies (gillotage) were:

- Cham (Amédée de Noé)
- Honoré Daumier
- Alexandre-Gabriel Decamps
- Achille Devéria
- Gustave Doré
- Eugène Forest
- Paul Gavarni
- André Gill
- Alfred Grévin
- Grandville (Jean-Ignace-Isidore Gérard)
- Paul Hadol
- Alfred Le Petit
- Maurice Loutreuil
- Henry Monnier
- Louis Touchagues
- Gaspard-Félix Tournachon, known as Nadar
- Charles-Joseph Traviès de Villers, known as Traviès

== Selected contributing writers ==
- Louis Desnoyers
- Louis Leroy
- Henri Rochefort
- Agénor Altaroche
- Philibert Audebrand
- Charles Bataille
- Clément Caraguel
- Albert Cler
- Taxile Delord
- Louis Adrien Huart
- Jaime
- Henry Maret

== Illustrations in Le Charivari ==
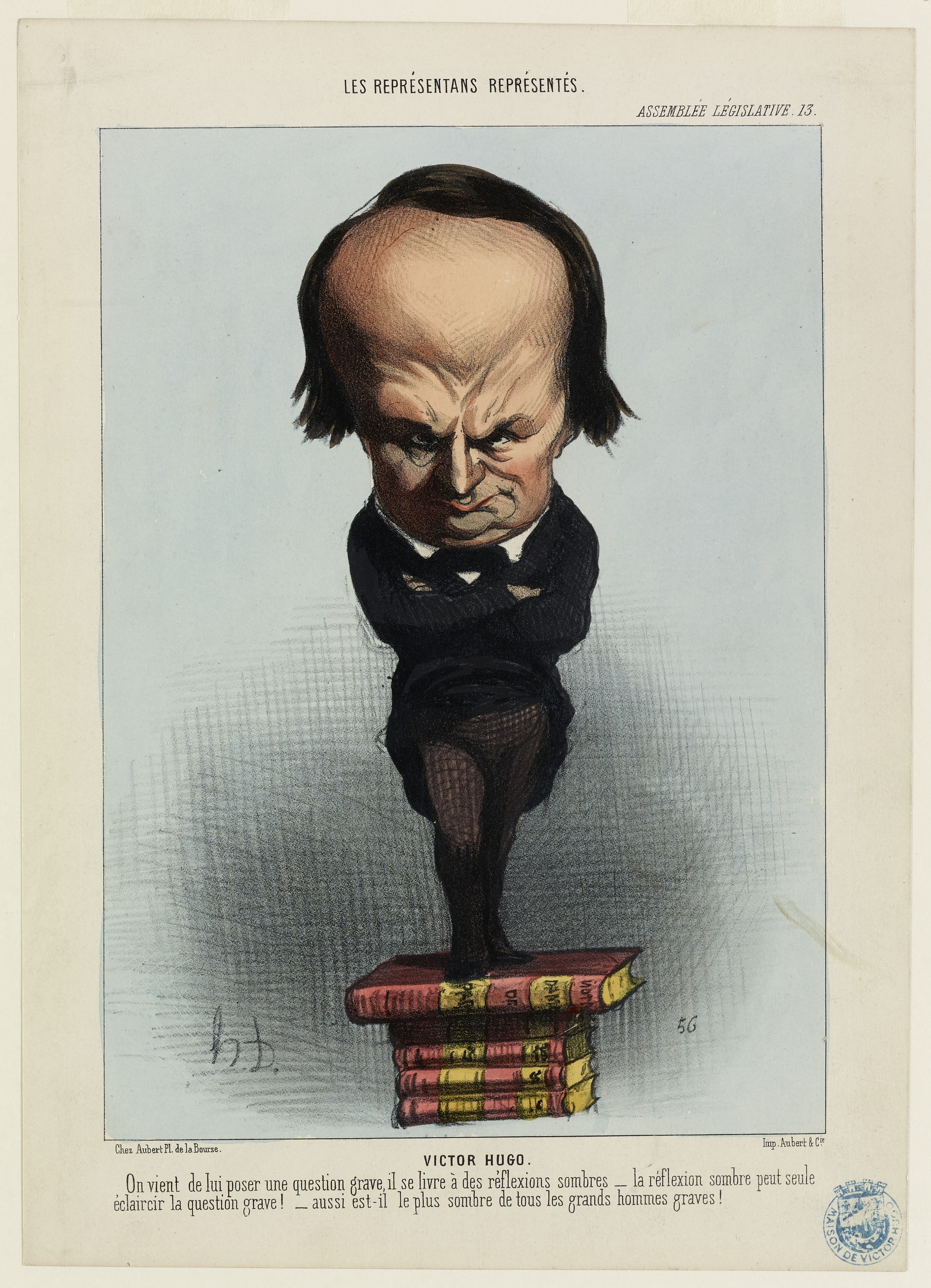
Lithograph of Victor Hugo by Honoré Daumier published 20 July 1849

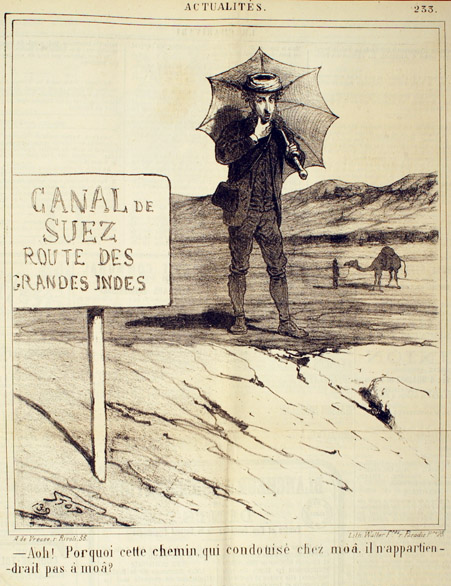
Lithograph by Louis Morel-Retz, published
22 November 1869

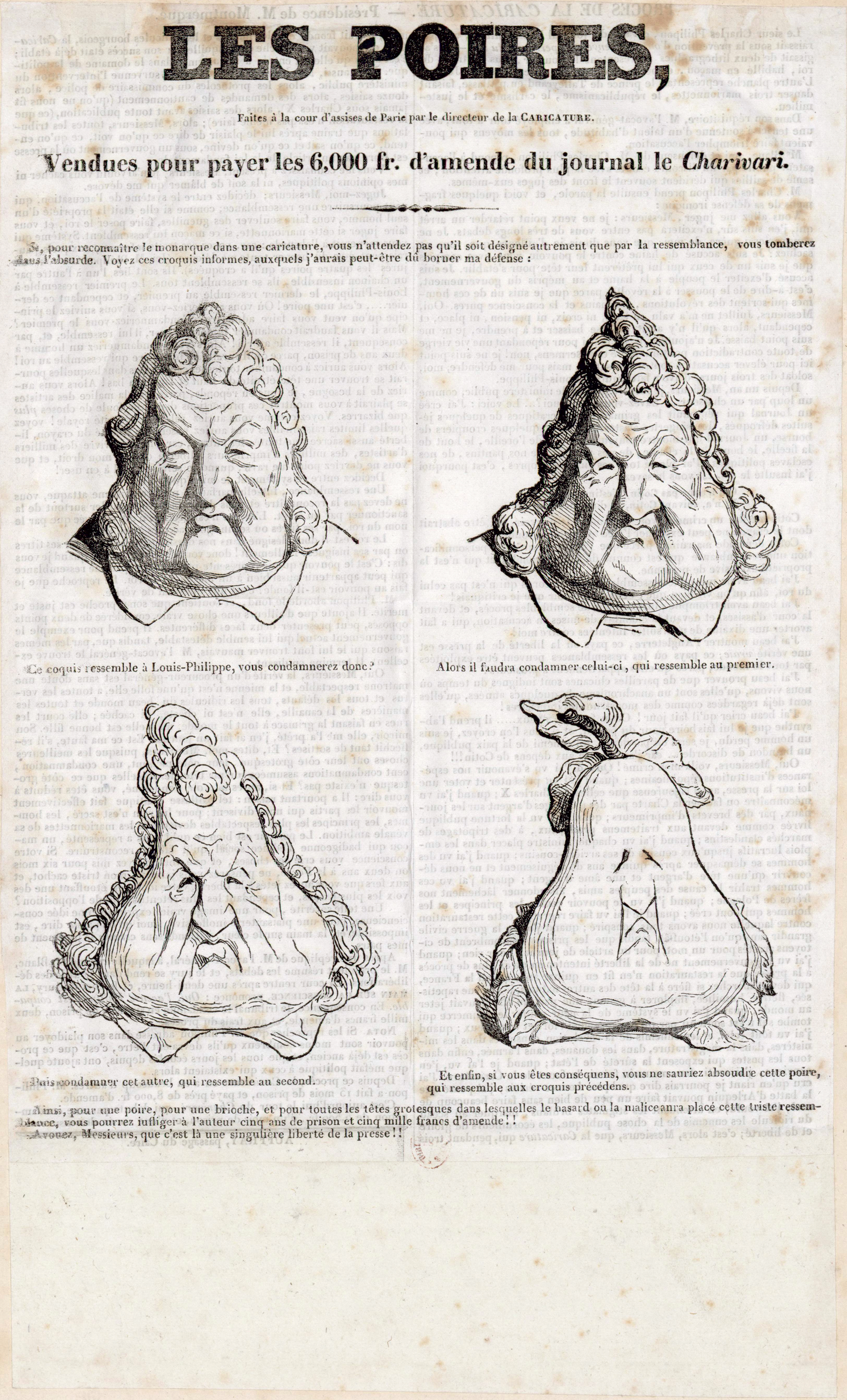
Caricature of Louis Philippe, published
17 January 1834

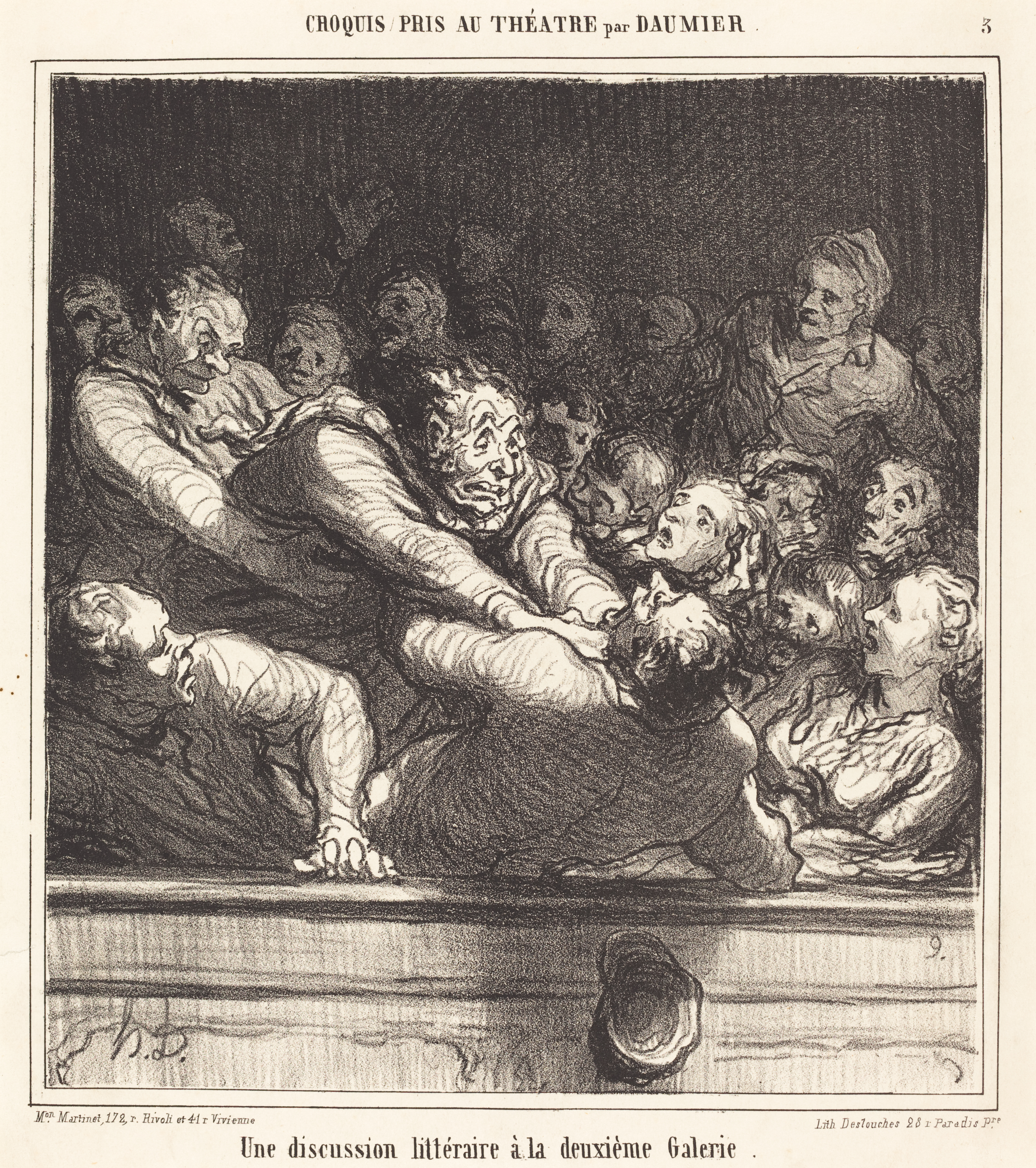
Lithograph by Honoré Daumier published
27 February 1864

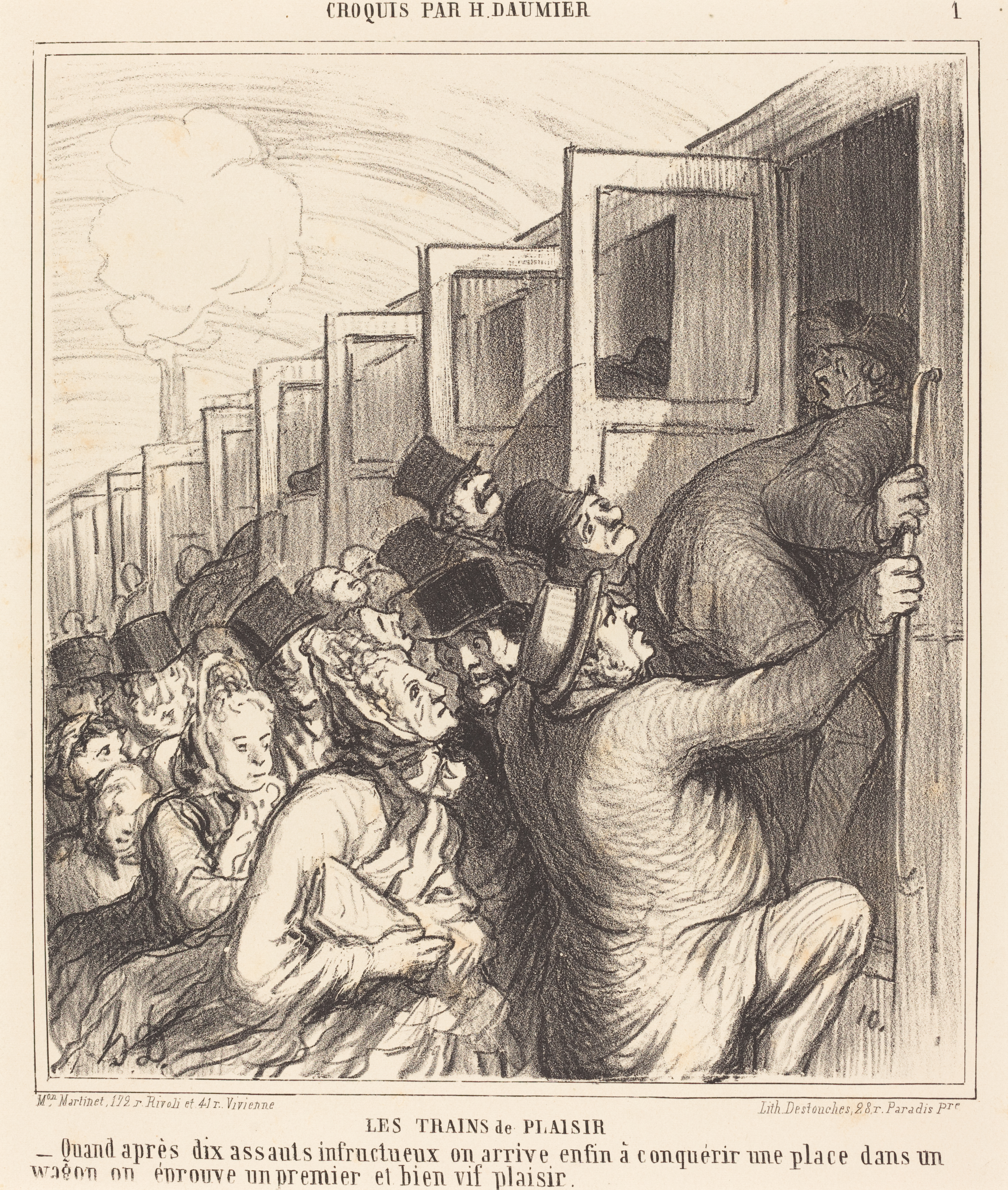
Lithograph by Honoré Daumier published 1864

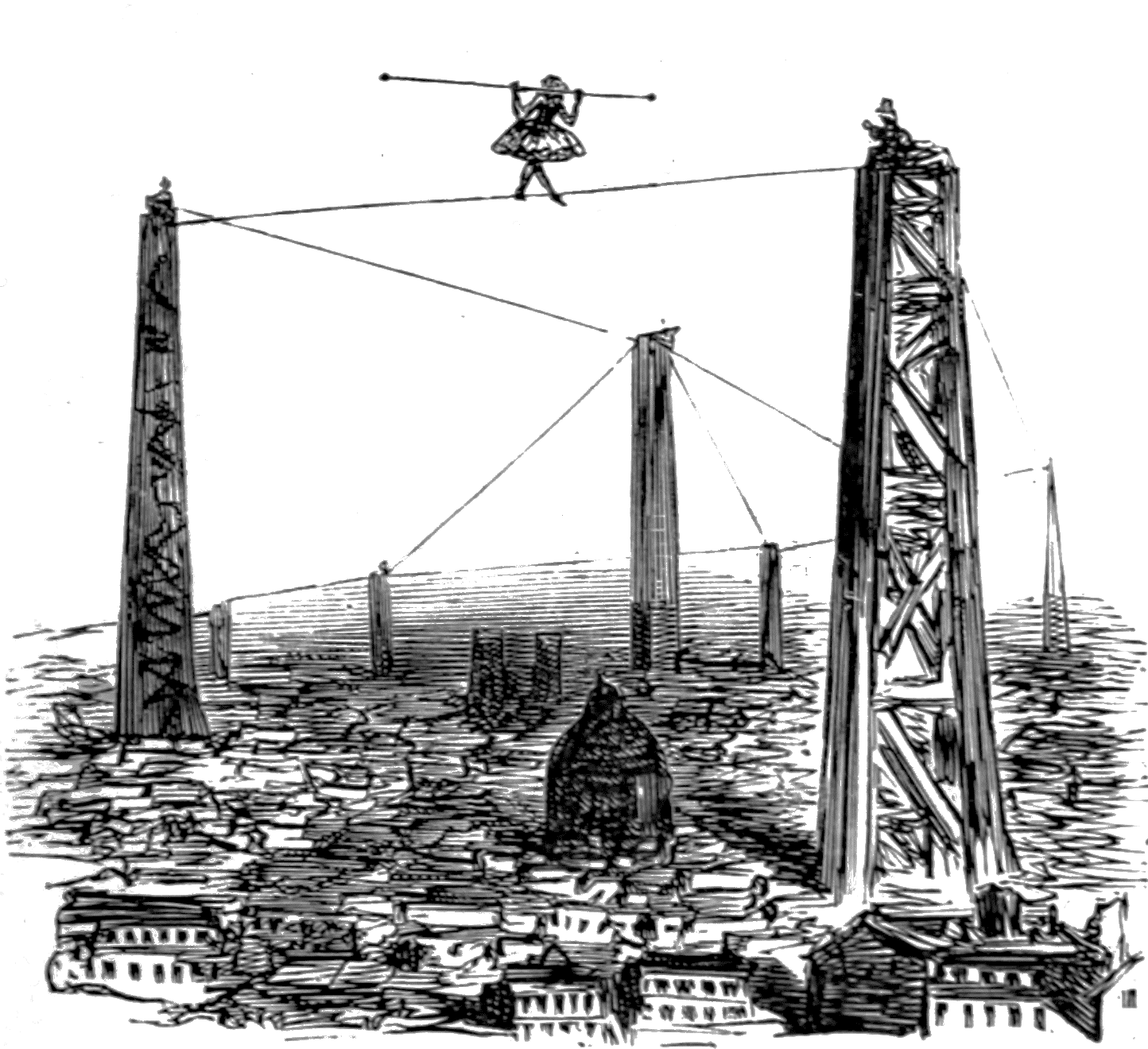
Satirical cartoon by Cham captioned "Madame Saqui was responsible for putting the surveyors in touch with each other during the triangulation operation". Charivari - Vol 6
