= Juste milieu =

Centrist ideology of the French July Monarchy

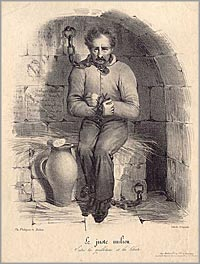
Le juste milieu by Charles Philipon, c. 1830, representing it as chaining the common man

Juste milieu (meaning "middle way" or "happy medium") is a term that has been used to describe centrist political philosophies that try to find a balance between extremes, and artistic forms that try to find a middle ground between the traditional and the modern. In the political sense it is most associated with the French July Monarchy (1830–1848), which ostensibly tried to strike a balance between autocracy and anarchy. The term has been used in both a positive and negative sense.

== Early usage ==
The term has been used at different times in French history. Jacques-François Blondel, in his article in the Encyclopedia of 1762 described the work of the architect Pierre Contant d'Ivry as shown in the Palais-Royal in Paris as the juste milieu between two extremes, the gravity of the former classicist style and the frivolity of the more recent Rococo style. Pierre-Alexandre-Laurent Forfait, a French engineer who became Minister of the Navy, was elected to the legislature in 1791 during the French Revolution. He was a very moderate revolutionary, and was called the Juste milieu by the extremists, a title he accepted with pride.

== July Monarchy politics ==
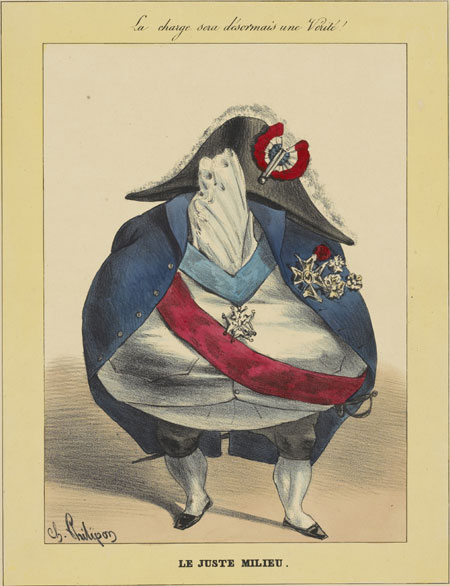
Cartoon by Charles Philipon, c. 1830, representing the philosophy as an empty suit of clothes

During the July Monarchy, in January 1831 Louis-Philippe received an address sent by the city of Gaillac, which said it submitted itself to the King's government "in order to assure the development of the conquests of July". His much-quoted response was that "We will attempt to remain in a juste milieu, in an equal distance from the excesses of popular power and the abuses of royal power."

Vincent E. Starzinger compares the Juste Milieu of the Doctrinaires of France to English Whiggism of the same period, finding similarities in ideas of sovereignty, representation, freedom and history. An article in the Edinburgh Review of January 1833 made this identification, saying the three great parties in France were "its Tory Carlists, its juste milieu Whigs, and its Radical Republicans. The article praised François Guizot and Victor de Broglie as "always the tried and consistent friends of freedom ... the most accomplished scholars ... of constitutional learning." In 1836 Guizot, then prime minister in France under Louis Philippe, described the concept as,

Our policy ... the policy of the juste milieu, is essentially inimical to absolute principles, to consequences carried to the extreme. We ourselves are the living embodiment of this idea; for, allow me to remind you, we have fought for freedom as we have for order ... The policy of the juste milieu must be defined as against all excesses; yes, it rejects absolute principles, extreme principles; it is adaptable to the divers needs of society; it manages to stay abreast of ongoing social changes, and in turn engages in combat whenever necessary.

Caricaturists such as Charles Philipon, Jules David and Honoré Daumier generally belonged to the mouvement party, and wanted to implement the ideals of liberty and the French republic. They attacked the juste milieu as a trick to prevent these ideals being achieved. Charles Philipon caricatured king Louis Philippe with a drawing titled Le juste milieu that depicted him as a pear-shaped dummy with no head, wearing ancien regime clothes, but with a tricolor on his hat. A white Bourbon flag is stuffed into his waistcoat. It suggests that his supposed commitment to republican ideals is superficial, and in fact he is a believer in traditional monarchy.

Eventually the tension between the monarchical principle and republican ideals represented in the Juste milieu proved unsustainable, and the regime was overthrown in the French Revolution of 1848.

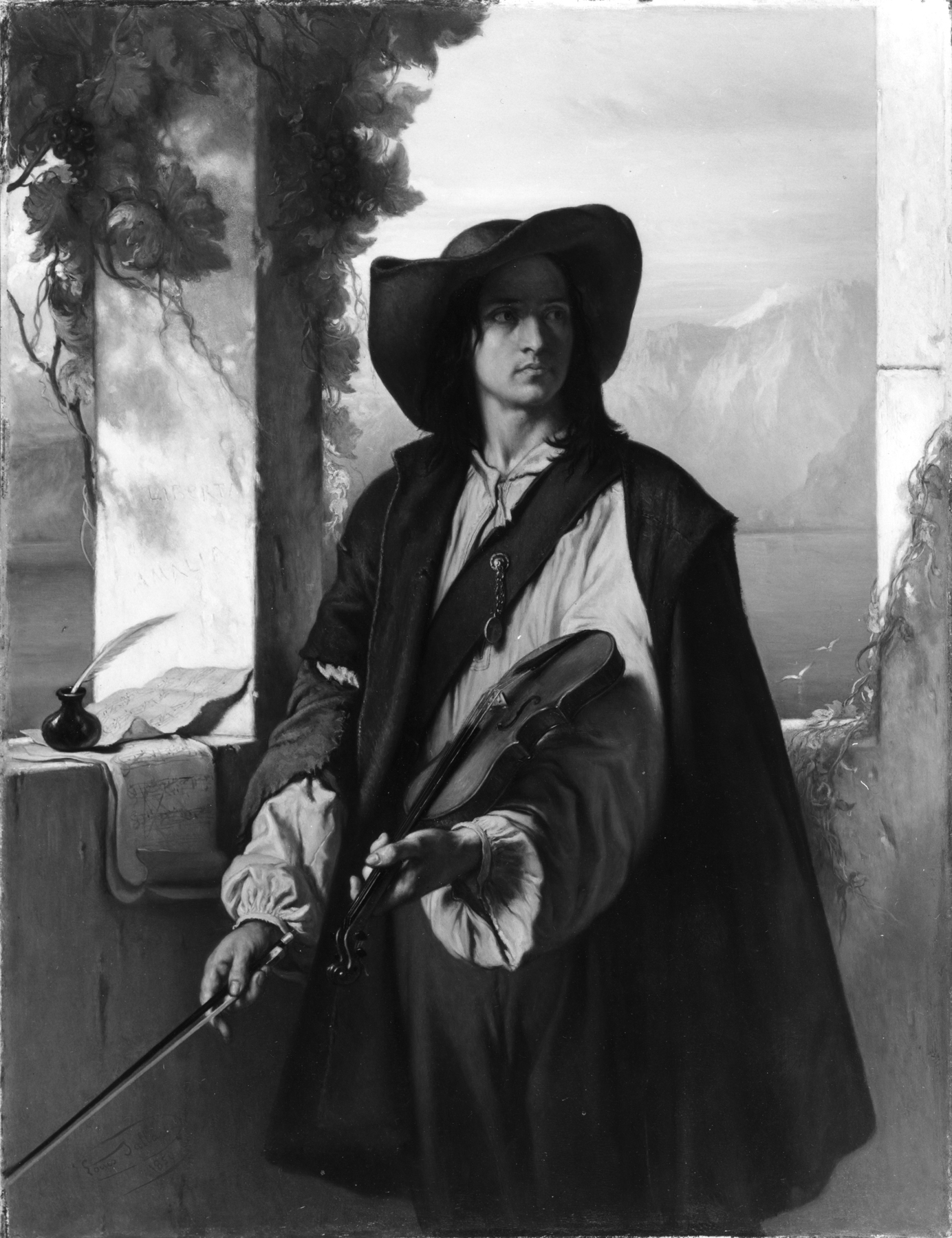
Art and Liberty by Louis Gallait (1859). Walters Art Museum.

== 19th century art ==
The term juste milieu has been applied to art in the July Monarchy (1830–1848) to describe a style of painting that reconciled classicists such as Auguste Couder and romantics such as Eugène Delacroix. Juste milieu artists included Désiré Court, Jean-Baptiste-Auguste Vinchon, Hanna Hirsch-Pauli, Horace Vernet, Charles-Émile-Callande de Champmartin and Ary Scheffer. The art historian Albert Boime extended the term from this common usage to also cover a "compromise movement" that he detected among artists in the 1880s. There does indeed seem to have been a group of artists who were recognized at the time as falling between the Impressionists and such pompier artists as William-Adolphe Bouguereau.

The term as used from the 1830s through to the 1920s characterized artists who created popular works, not as radical as the avant-garde, but modern nevertheless. They would be looked down as less "authentic" than the path breakers of their time, but they were much more commercially successful. The juste milieu in the fin de siècle had a great range of styles. They can perhaps be best characterized as professional insiders who sought official honors, as opposed to radical outsiders.

Some members of the juste milieu around the end of the nineteenth century thought of themselves as heirs of the French impressionists. Members who exhibited in Vienna in 1903 included Max Liebermann, Max Klinger, Paul-Albert Besnard, Charles Cottet, James McNeill Whistler and John Lavery.
