= Benjamin Roubaud =

French painter

- Born: Joseph Germain Mathieu Roubaud; 29 May 1811; Roquevaire
- Died: 13 January 1847 (aged 35); Algiers
- Occupations: Lithographer; Caricaturist

Joseph Germain Mathieu Roubaud, called "Benjamin", (29 May 1811 – 13 January 1847), the son of Mathieu Aubert Roubaud and Rosalie Caillol, was a 19th-century French painter, lithographer and caricaturist.

== Biography ==
In Paris Roubaud was a student of painter Louis Hersent. From 1833 to 1847, he exhibited at the Salon genre paintings, landscapes, portraits, still lifes in the way of the master, and became a painter of an honorable place. After 1840, he was correspondent in Algiers of the magazine L'Illustration and at the end of his life, treated subjects related to Algeria.

It is as a cartoonist and caricaturist that he showed the fullness of his talent. Alongside artists like Daumier or Grandville, he collaborated from 1830 to 1835 with La Caricature and Le Charivari, illustrated satirical newspapers directed by Charles Philipon (of whom he drew a portrait charge, as well as with other newspapers such as La Mode. From 1839 to 1841, he realized for the Galerie de la presse, de la littérature et des arts and the Panthéon charivarique, portraits of personalities among the most influential of the time which now make prominent historical documents (100 boards).

== Series published at Aubert ==
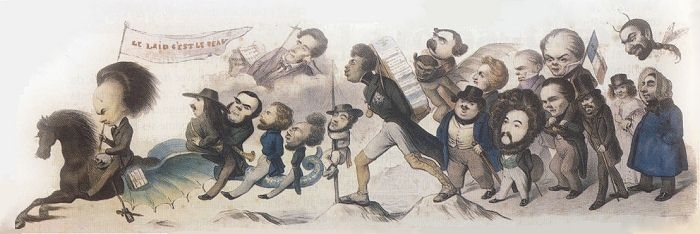
Le Grand Chemin de la postérité ("The Great Path of posterity"). Mounted on the romantic Pegasus, Hugo, "King of the Hugolâtres, armed with his good sword of Toledo and carrying the banner of Notre-Dame de Paris" takes hipped Théophile Gautier, Cassagnac, Francis Wey and Paul Fouché. Eugène Sue makes an effort to climb to their level and Alexandre Dumas hurries up, while Lamartine, in the clouds, "indulges in his political, poetic and religious meditations". Satirical engraving by Benjamin Roubaud.

- Les Annonces (with Philipon), Les Mauvais Locataires, Vie et Aventures de M. Jobard, La Contrebande aux Barrières, Enfantillages ;
- Portraits-Charge for the Miroir drolatique.
- Le Grand chemin de la postérité : 3 series (men of letters, playwrights, novelists, actors), large leaves in width, each comprising two strips of portraits-charges.

== Point of view ==
"Benjamin Roubaud hardly reaches the comic; just drawing attracts him more; he pencils carefully, with charm; the sake of accuracy gives him a taste of the portrait-charge, which he successfully creates" (Émile Bayard, La Caricature et les caricaturistes, (p. 125).

== Bibliography ==
- Émile Bayard, La caricature et les caricaturistes, Paris, Delagrave, 1900.
- Bénézit
  - Emmanuel Bénézit (1976). Dictionnaire critique des peintres, sculpteurs, dessinateurs et graveurs de tous les temps et de tous les pays par un groupe d'écrivains spécialistes français et étrangers. Éditions Gründ.
  - Bénézit. Oxford University Press. 2011. doi:10.1093/benz/9780199773787.article.B00156726. Archived from the original on 2016-04-05.
- Allgemeines Künstler Lexikon : die bildender Künstler aller Zeiten und Völker, Saur, München, K. G. Saur, 1992.
- John Grand-Carteret, Les Mœurs et la Caricature en France, 1888.
