= Agénor Altaroche =

French journalist and chansonnier (1811–1884)

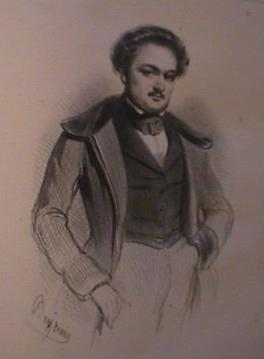
- Agénor Altaroche by Benjamin Roubaud
- Born: Marie Durand Michel Agénor Altaroche; 18 April 1811; Issoire
- Died: 13 May 1884 (aged 73); Vaux
- Occupations: Journalist; Chansonnier; Politician

Agénor Altaroche (18 April 1811 – 13 May 1884) was a French journalist, chansonnier and man of letters, Commissioner of the Provisional Government for the Puy-de-Dôme in 1848, representative of that department to the 1848 Constituent Assembly.

== Bibliography ==
- Hoefer, Ferdinand, Nouvelle biographie générale : depuis les temps les plus reculés jusqu'à nos jours avec les renseignements bibliographiques et l'indication des sources à consulter, t.II, p. 227, Paris, Firmin-Didot frères, 1852-1856.
- Dictionnaire de biographie française par Michel Prévost, Henri Tribout de Morembert, J.C. Roman d'Amat, et al., Paris, Letouzey et Ané, 1936.
- Maitron, Jean, Dictionnaire biographique du mouvement ouvrier français, t.1, 1789-1864, De la Révolution française à la Première Internationale, Paris, Ed. Ouvrières, 1964.
- "Agénor Altaroche", in Adolphe Robert and Gaston Cougny, Dictionnaire des parlementaires français (1789–1891), Bourloton, Paris, 1889 Edition details Wikisource.
