= Nicolas-Toussaint Charlet =

French painter (1792–1845)

Portrait of Nicolas-Toussaint Charlet, print by Louis Dupré

Nicolas-Toussaint Charlet (French: [nikɔla tusɛ̃ ʃaʁlɛ]; 20 December 1792 – 30 October 1845) was a French painter and printmaker, more especially of military subjects.

== Life ==
Charlet was born in Paris. He was the son of a dragoon in the Republican army, whose death in the ranks left the widow and orphan in very poor circumstances. Madame Charlet, however, a woman of determined spirit and an extreme Bonapartist, managed to give her boy a moderate education at the Lycée Napoléon, and was repaid by his lifelong affection.

His first employment was a minor post in the Paris city administration, where he had to register recruits: he served in the National Guard in 1814, fought bravely at the Barrière de Clichy, and, being thus unacceptable to the Bourbon party, was dismissed from the city administration in 1816. He then, having from a very early age had a propensity for drawing, entered the atelier of the distinguished painter Baron Gros, and soon began issuing the first of those lithographed designs which eventually brought him renown.

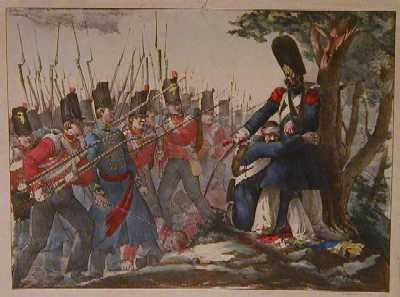
Waterloo Grenadier

His Grenadier de Waterloo, 1817, with the motto "The Guard Dies and Does Not Surrender" (La Garde meurt et ne se rend pas)—a famous phrase frequently attributed to Cambronne but which he never uttered, and which cannot, perhaps, be traced farther than to this lithograph by Charlet—was particularly popular. It was only towards 1822, however, that he began to be successful in a professional sense. Lithographs (about 2000 altogether), watercolours, sepia drawings, numerous oil sketches, and a few etchings followed one another rapidly. Later in his life there were also three exhibited oil pictures, the especially admired Episode in the Campaign of Russia (1836), the Passage of the Rhine by Moreau (1837), and Wounded Soldiers Halting in a Ravine (1843).

His military subjects particularly delighted Charlet, and they found an energetic response in the popular heart where they kept alive a feeling of pride and regret for the recent past of the French nation and discontent with the present. These feelings increased upon the artist himself towards the close of his career as Charlet designed many subjects of town life, peasant life, and the ways of children with much wit and whim in his descriptive mottoes. One of the most famous sets is the Vie civile, politique, et militaire du Caporal Valentin, 50 lithographs dating from 1838 to 1842. In 1838 his health began to fail owing to an affection of the chest.

Charlet married in 1824, and two sons survived him.

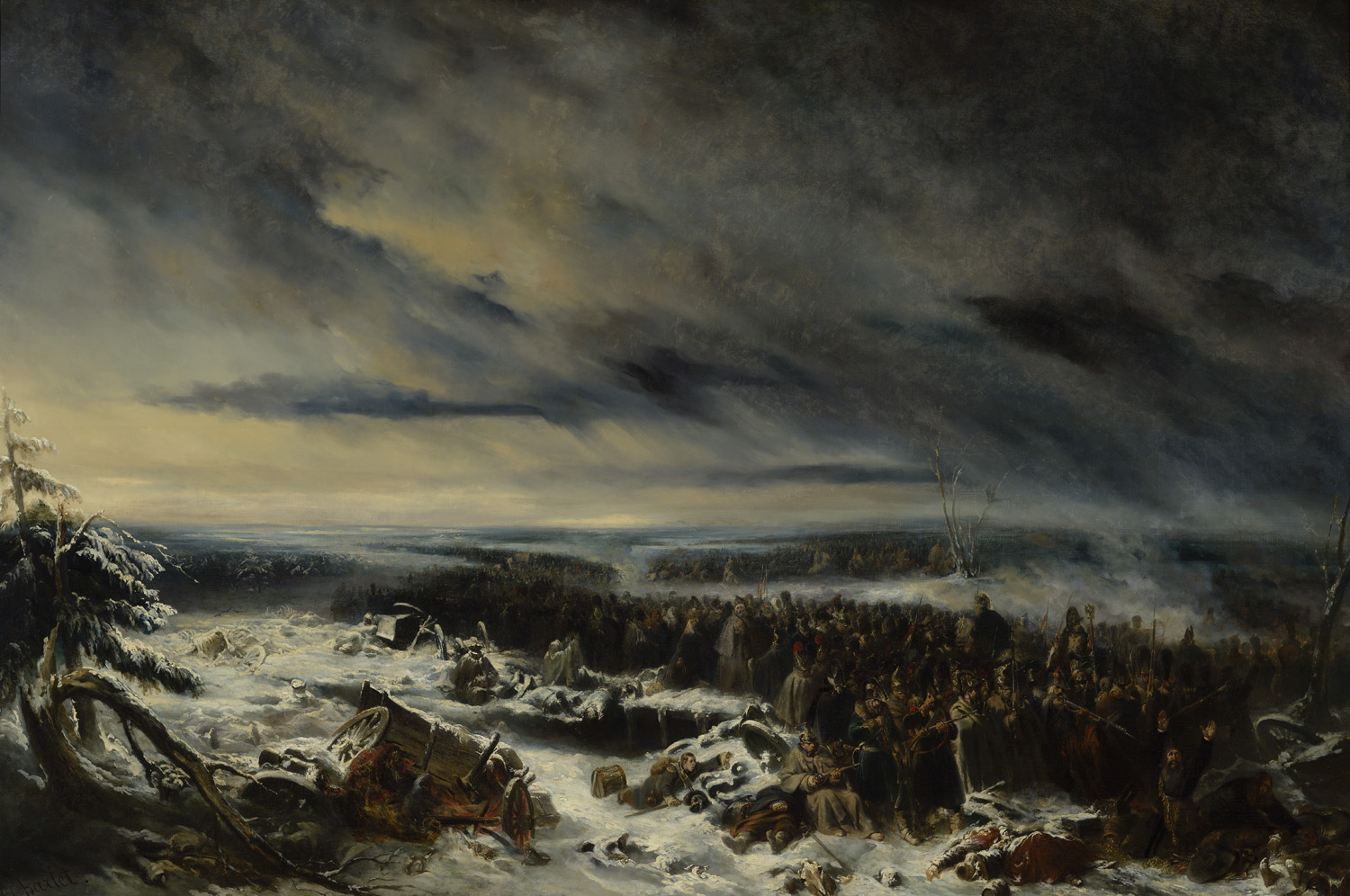
Episode from the Russian Campaign

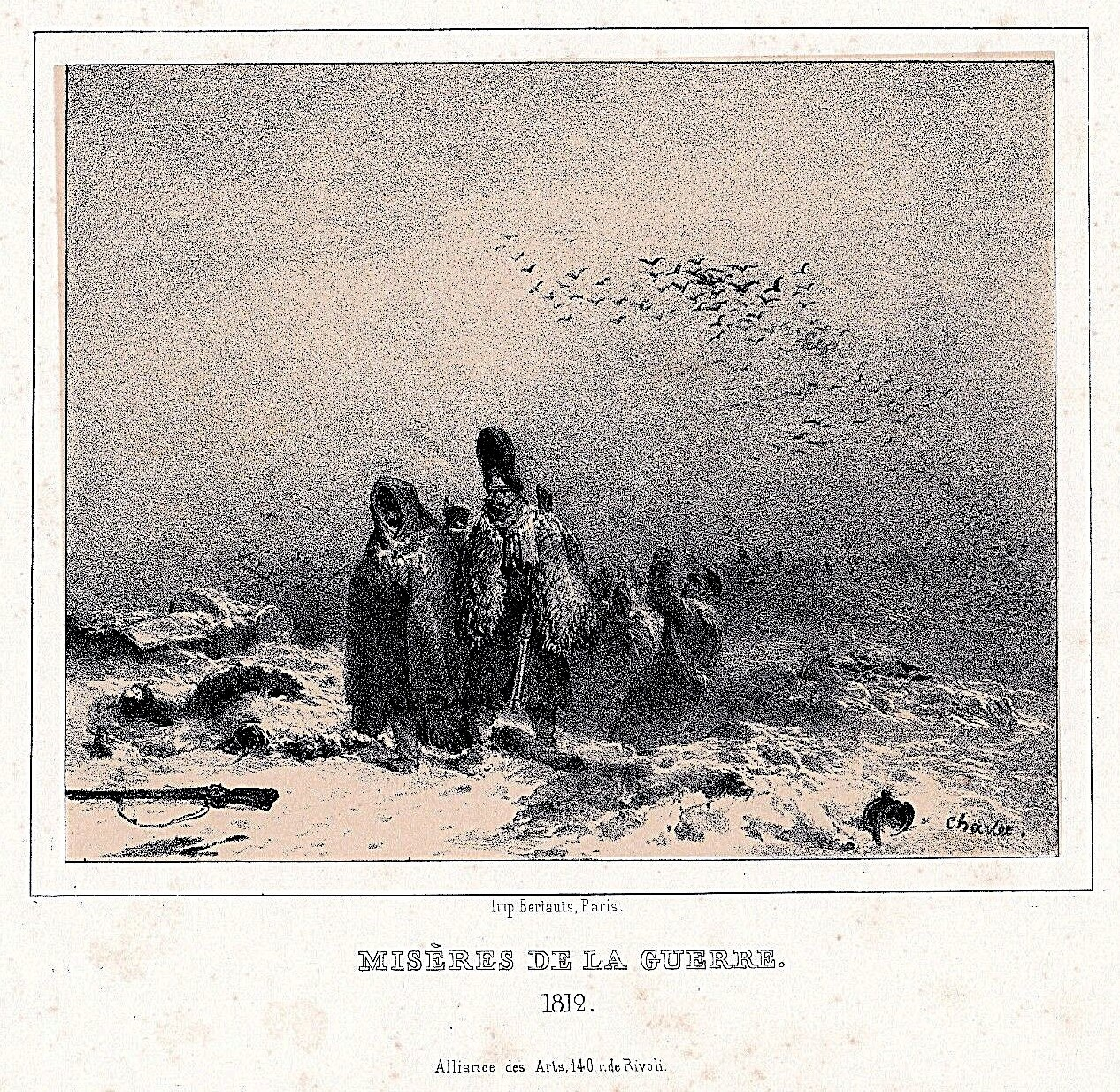
Retreat from Russia

== Legacy ==
A life of Charlet was published in 1856 by a military friend, De la Combe.
