= Lami (name) =

Lami is a surname and a unisex given name. Notable people with the name include:

== Surname ==
- Adel Lami (born 1985), Qatari football player
- Alessandro Lami (1949–2015), Italian philologist
- Alphonse Lami (1822–1867), French sculptor
- Annie Lami, Italian literary translator
- Basilio Lami Dozo (1929–2017), Argentine military officer
- Edgardo Lami Starnuti (1887–1968), Italian lawyer and politician
- Eugène Lami (1800–1890), French painter and engraver
- Giovanni Lami (1697–1770), Italian jurist and antiquarian
- Mitì Vigliero Lami (born 1957), Italian journalist
- Stanislas Lami (1858–1944), French sculptor
- Waleed Salim Al-Lami (born 1992), Iraqi football player

== Given name ==
- Fati Lami Abubakar (born 1951), Nigerian jurist
- Lami Phillips (born 1980), Nigerian musician and actress
- Lami Yakini (born 1985), Congolese football player

== See also ==
- Lami, disambiguation page
