= Lamy (disambiguation) =

Lamy is a German fountain pen brand and producer.

Lamy may also refer to:

- Lamy (surname)
- Yukihana Lamy, VTuber
- Lamy, New Mexico, United States
  - Lamy station
- Fort Lamy, former name of N'Djamena, Chad
- Lamy River, former name of the East River, Guangdong, China
- Lamy (and Rinck), catalogue of Peruvian stamp cancellations

== See also ==
- Lami (disambiguation)
