= Pierre-Charles Simart =

French sculptor (1806–1857)

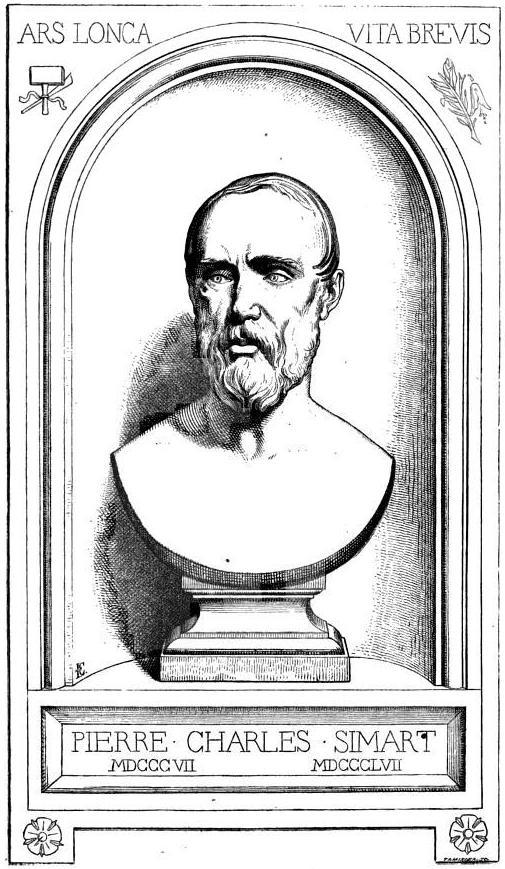
Pierre-Charles Simart; after a bust by Francisque Duret

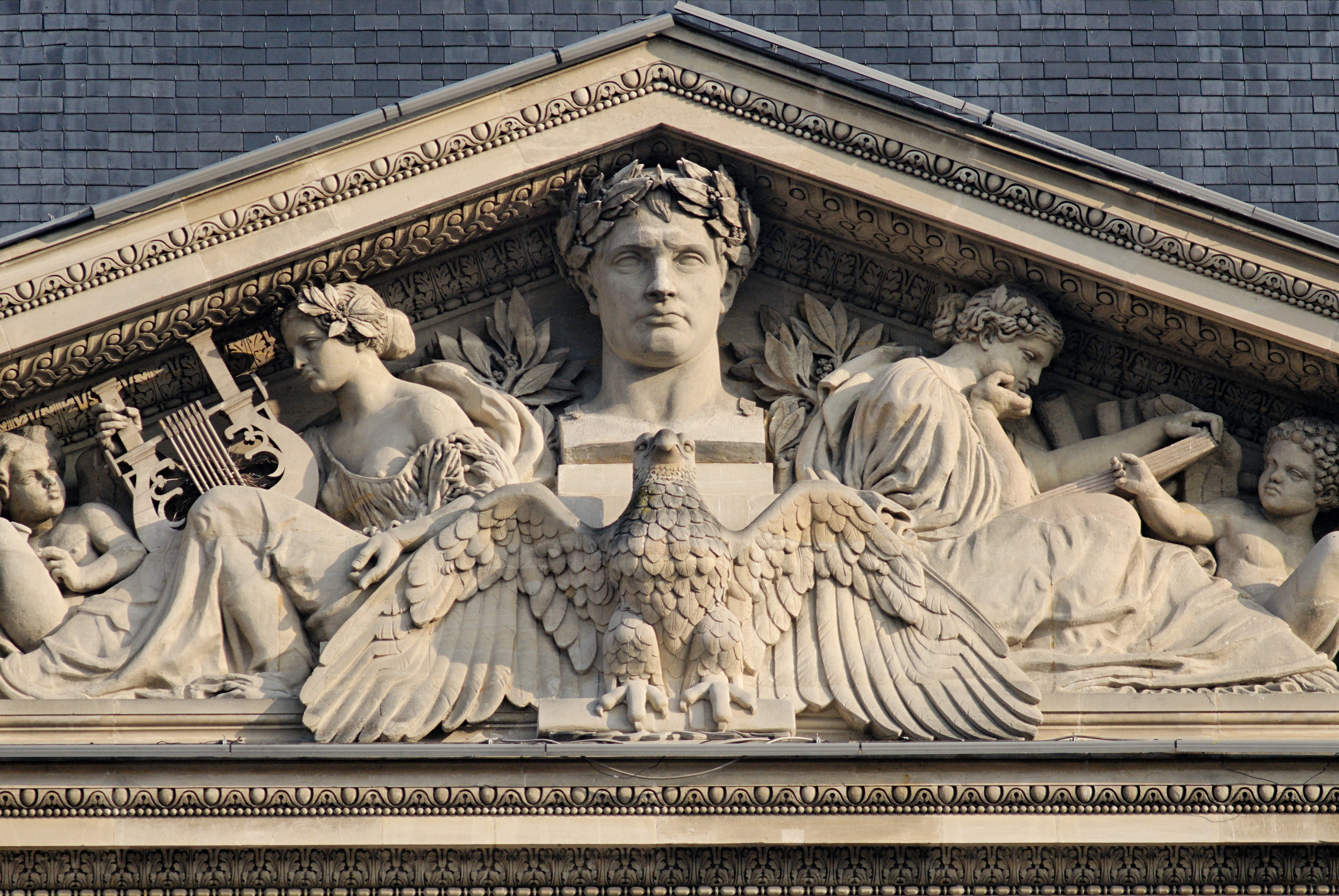
Pediment at the Pavillon de l’Horloge, Louvre, Paris

Pierre-Charles Simart (born in Troyes on 27 June 1806, died in Paris on 27 May 1857) was a French sculptor.

The son of a carpenter from Troyes in Champagne, Simart was the pupil of Antoine Desbœuf, Charles Dupaty, Jean-Pierre Cortot and James Pradier. In 1833, he won the first Prix de Rome for sculpture with a relief Le Vieillard et les enfants.

He was an elected member of the Académie des Beaux-Arts in 1852.

== Main works ==
- La Poésie épique, statue, marble, Paris, Jardin du Luxembourg
- La Philosophie, statue, marble, Paris, Jardin du Luxembourg
- pediment of the Pavillon de l’Horloge, Louvre, Paris, with fellow sculptor Antoine-Louis Barye, 1857
- Statue of Napoleon in coronation robes and reliefs of Napoleon's achievements, Napoleon's tomb at Les Invalides, Paris
- a chryselephantine (gold and ivory) recreation of the Athena Parthenos originally by classical sculptor Phidias, for patron Honoré Théodoric d'Albert de Luynes
- four Hellenic friezes and ten reliefs at the Château de Dampierre, for architect Félix Duban, 1841–1843
