= Lami =

Lami may refer to:

== People ==
- Lami (name), list of people with the name.

== Places ==
- Lami, Fiji, town
- Lami (Open Constituency, Fiji)
- Lami José Lutzenberger Biological Reserve
- Lami, Porto Alegre, Brazil

== Other ==
- Lami F.C., Fijian football team
- Lami language, Southern Loloish language of Yunnan, China
- Lami Mosque in Ulcinj, Montenegro
- Lami's theorem, physical equation relating the magnitudes of three coplanar, concurrent and non-collinear vectors
- Izulu Lami, 2009 South African film
- Phakade Lami, 2012 song by South African singer Nomfundo Moh

== See also ==
- Lamy (disambiguation)
