= Napoleon's tomb =

Repository for the remains of Napoleon in Paris

Coordinates: 48.85505°N 2.312540°E

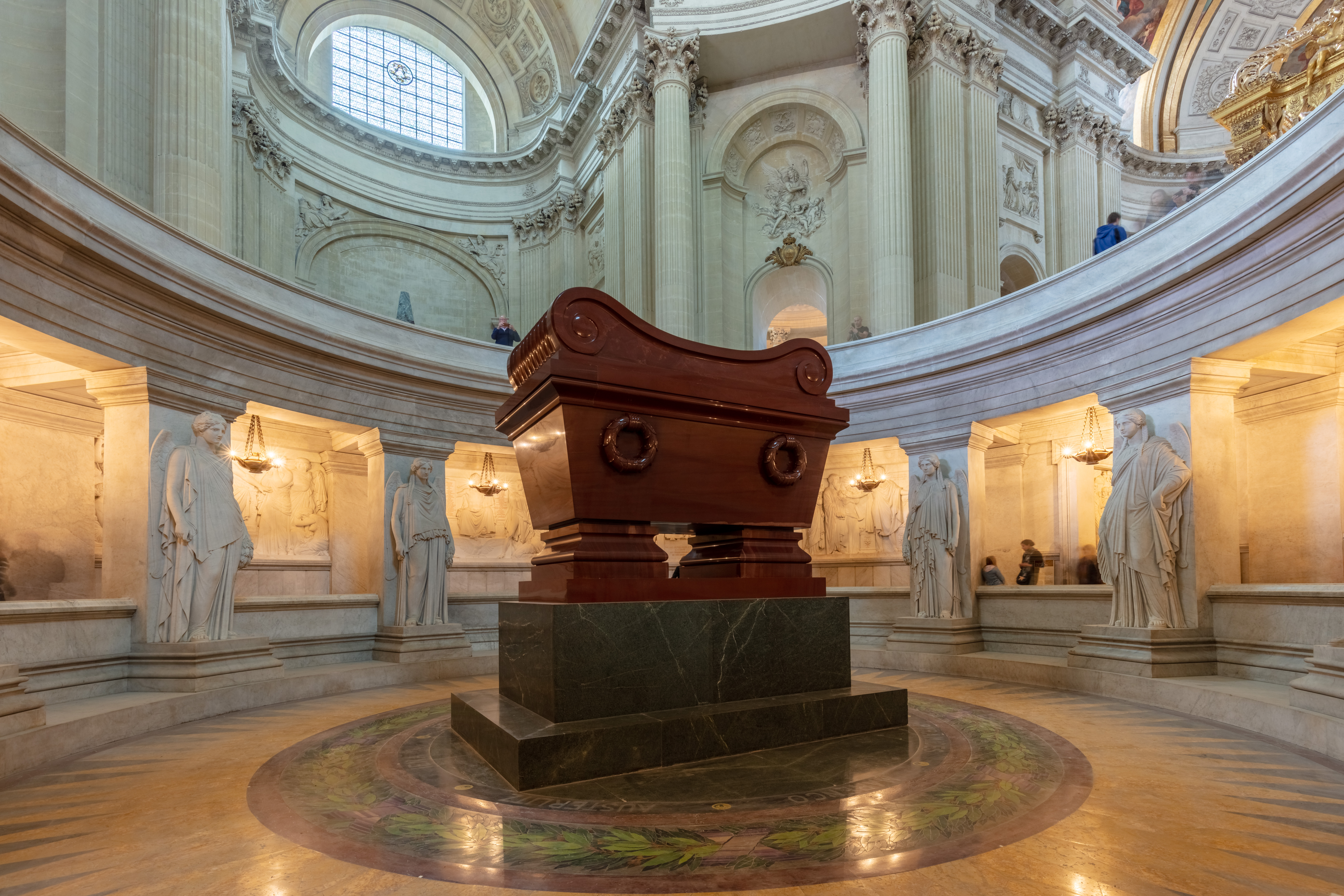
Tomb of Napoleon in the open crypt beneath the Dôme des Invalides

Napoleon's tomb (French: tombeau de Napoléon) is the monument erected at Les Invalides in Paris to keep the remains of Napoleon following their repatriation to France from Saint Helena in 1840, or retour des cendres, at the initiative of King Louis Philippe I and his minister Adolphe Thiers. While the tomb's planning started in 1840, it was only completed two decades later and inaugurated by Emperor Napoleon III on 2 April 1861, after its promoter Louis Philippe I, architect Louis Visconti, and main sculptors James Pradier and Pierre-Charles Simart had all died in the meantime.

== Background ==
In early 1840, the government led by Adolphe Thiers appointed a twelve-member committee (Commission des douze) to decide on the location and outline of the funerary monument and select its architect. The committee was chaired by politician Charles de Rémusat and included writers and artists such as Théophile Gautier, David d'Angers, and Jean-Auguste-Dominique Ingres.

In April 1840, the Commission des douze organised a competition in which 81 architects participated, whose projects were exhibited in the recently completed Palais des Beaux-Arts. After a protracted process, Louis Visconti was selected as project architect in 1842 and finalised his design around mid-1843.

== Design and completion ==
Visconti created a circular hollow, or open crypt, beneath the soaring dome of the Invalides. The crypt is accessed through a door flanked by two atlantes by Francisque Joseph Duret, with an inscription above recalling Napoleon's wish to be buried in Paris. It is surrounded by a circular gallery supported by twelve pillars adorned with victories, sculpted by James Pradier until his death in June 1852. On the gallery's wall are ten large relief panels which celebrate Napoleon's achievements, by Pierre-Charles Simart: Pacification de la nation, centralisation administrative, Conseil d'Etat, Code civil, Concordat, Université impériale, Cour des comptes, Code du commerce, Grands travaux, Légion d'honneur. Two additional panels, by François Jouffroy, commemorate the retour des cendres. A cella contains a partly gilded statue of Napoleon in coronation attire, also by Simart.

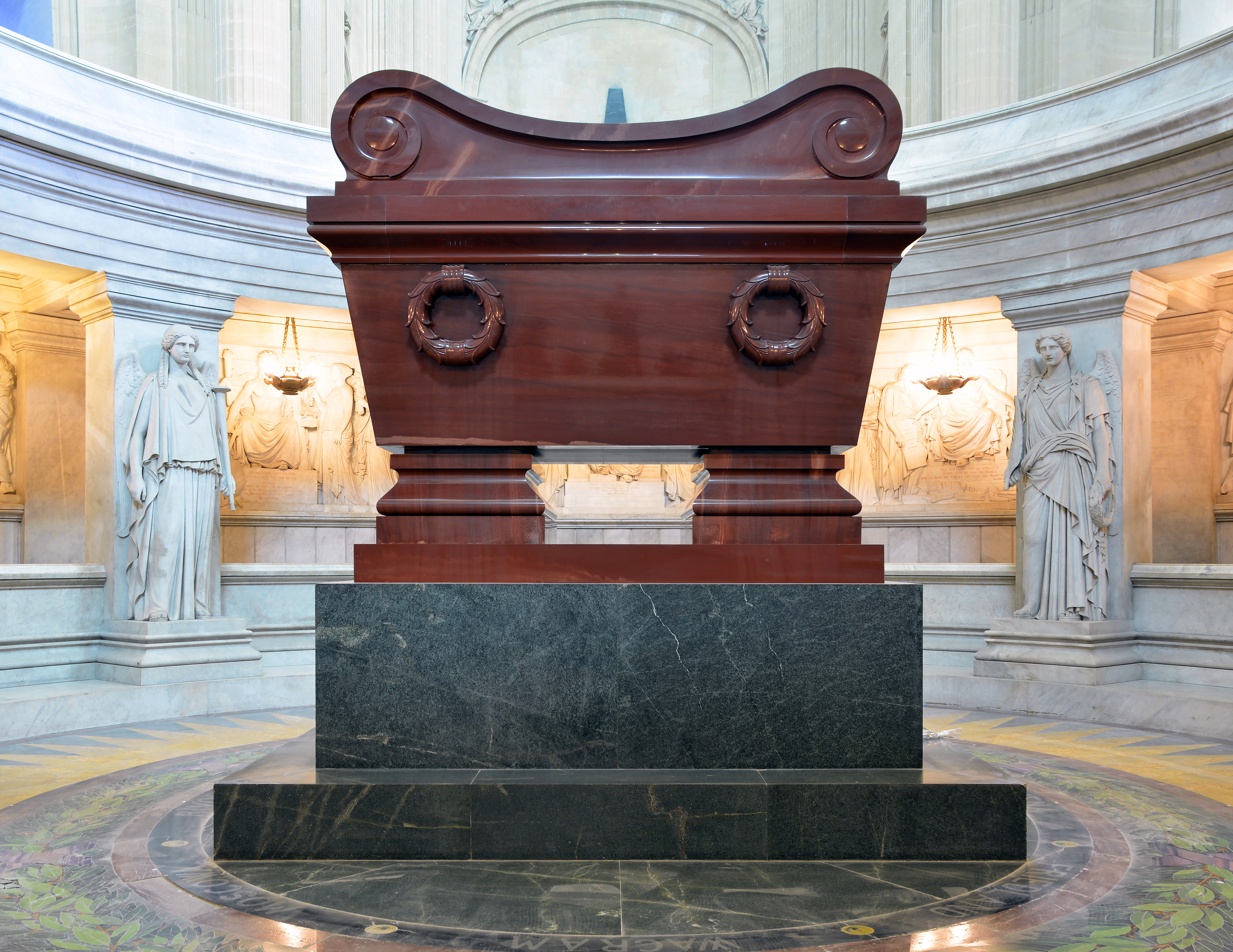
Sarcophagus of Napoleon

At its centre is a massive sarcophagus which has often been described as made of red porphyry, including in the Encyclopædia Britannica as of mid-2021, but is actually a purple Shoksha quartzite mined in Russian Karelia. The sarcophagus rests upon a base of green granite from the Vosges. That green granite block rests, in turn, upon a slab of black marble, 5.5m × 1.2m × 0.65m, quarried at Sainte-Luce and transported to Paris with great difficulty. In total the project used stone from no fewer than ten different quarries in and outside France, including Carrara marble from Italy and the quartzite from Russia.

The monument took years to complete, partly because of the exceptional requirements for the stone to be used. The Russian Shoksha quartzite, intended as an echo of the porphyry used for late Roman imperial burials, was quarried in 1848 by Italian engineer Giovanni Bujatti upon Tsar Nicholas I's special permission, and shipped via Kronstadt and Le Havre to Paris, where it arrived on 10 January 1849. The sarcophagus was then sculpted by marbler A. Seguin using innovative steam-machinery techniques. It was almost finished by December 1853, but the final stages were delayed by the sudden death of Visconti that month and by Napoleon III's alternative project to move his uncle's resting place to the Basilica of Saint-Denis, which he eventually renounced after having commissioned plans for it from Eugène Viollet-le-Duc. Visconti was succeeded by Jules Frédéric Bouchet and, following the latter's death in 1860, by Alphonse-Nicolas Crépinet.

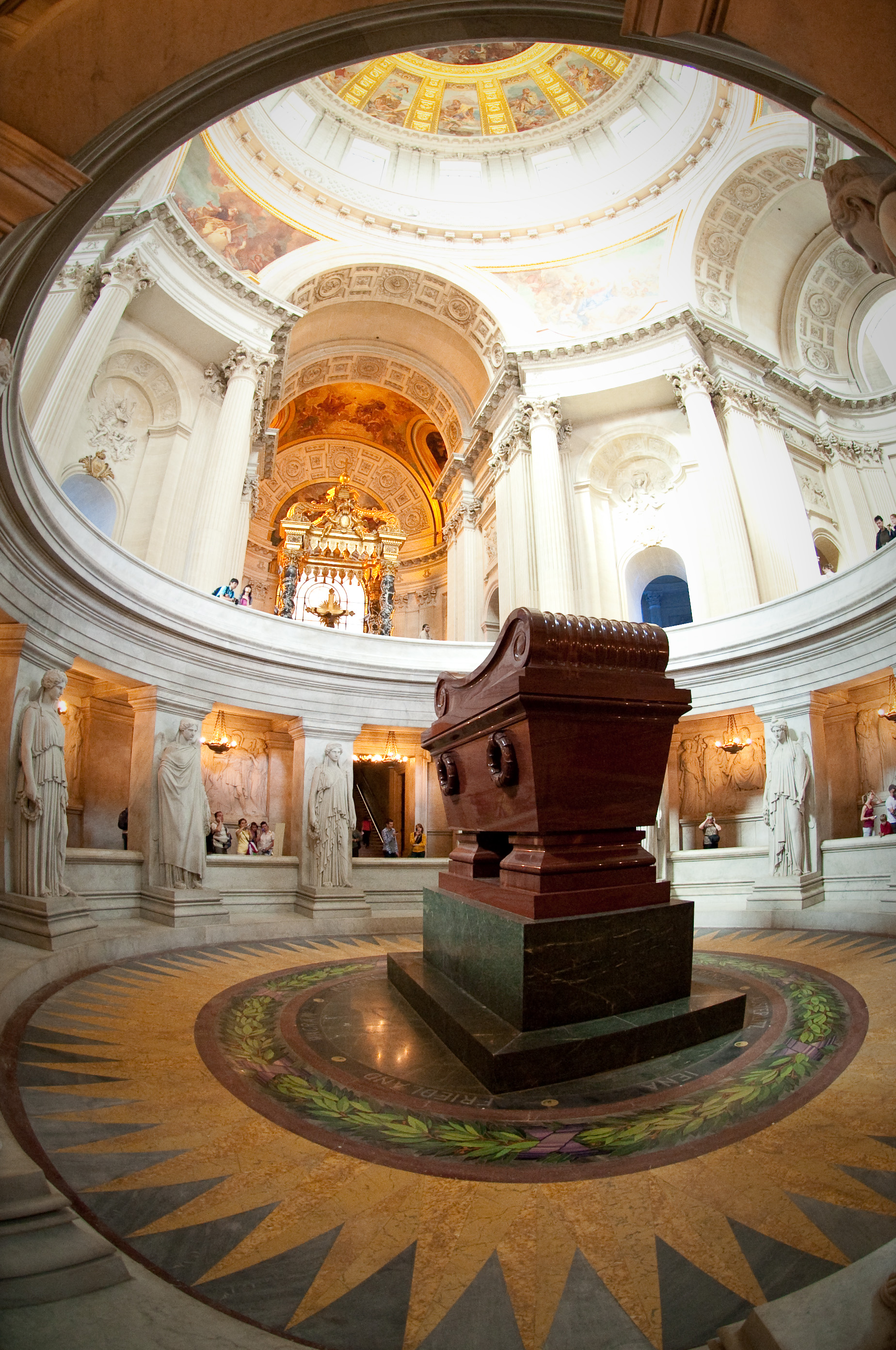
View from the crypt's floor towards the dome

On 2 April 1861, Napoleon's remains were finally transferred into the sarcophagus from the nearby chapel of Saint-Jérôme, where they had lain since 1840. The ceremony was somewhat subdued and only Napoleon III, Empress Eugénie, Louis-Napoléon, Prince Imperial, other related princes, government ministers, and senior officials of the crown were present.

== Later developments ==
The tombs of Napoleon's brothers were completed shortly afterwards, also in the Dome church, namely that of Jérôme Bonaparte in 1862 and that of Joseph Bonaparte in 1864.

On 15 December 1940, the coffin of Napoleon II was transported from Vienna to be placed next to his father's, following a decision made by Adolf Hitler upon advice from his ambassador to France Otto Abetz. Intended to boost support for collaboration in the French public, that initiative ended up precipitating a political crisis in Vichy and the abrupt dismissal of Pierre Laval by Philippe Pétain two days before the ceremony. On 18 December 1969, the coffin was transferred underground in the cella and covered by a marble slab.

In 2021, on the occasion of the second centenary of Napoleon's death, an installation titled Memento Marengo by French visual artist Pascal Convert was placed above the sarcophagus of Napoleon. It is a copy in synthetic materials of the skeleton of Napoleon's favorite horse Marengo, which is preserved as a war trophy (following Marengo's capture at the Battle of Waterloo) at the National Army Museum in London. The arrangement has generated controversy despite its temporary nature.

== Gallery ==
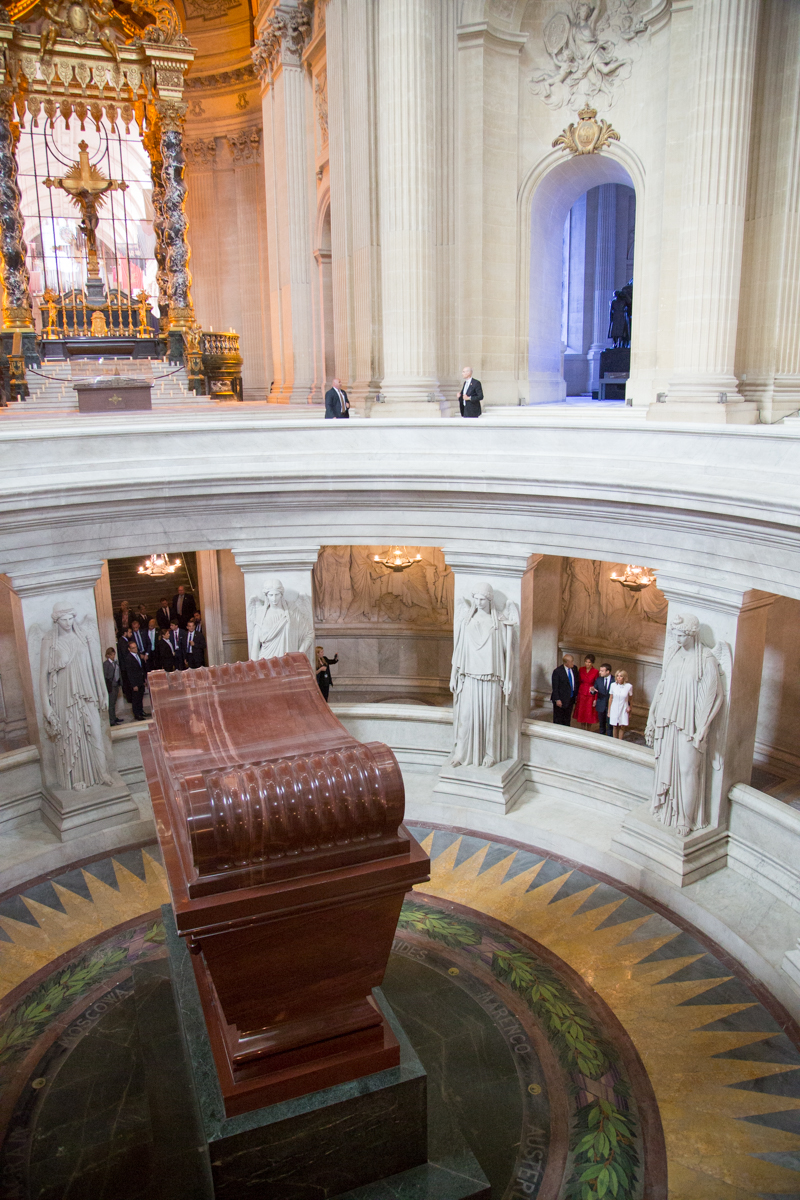
The open crypt seen from the ground level of the Dôme des Invalides

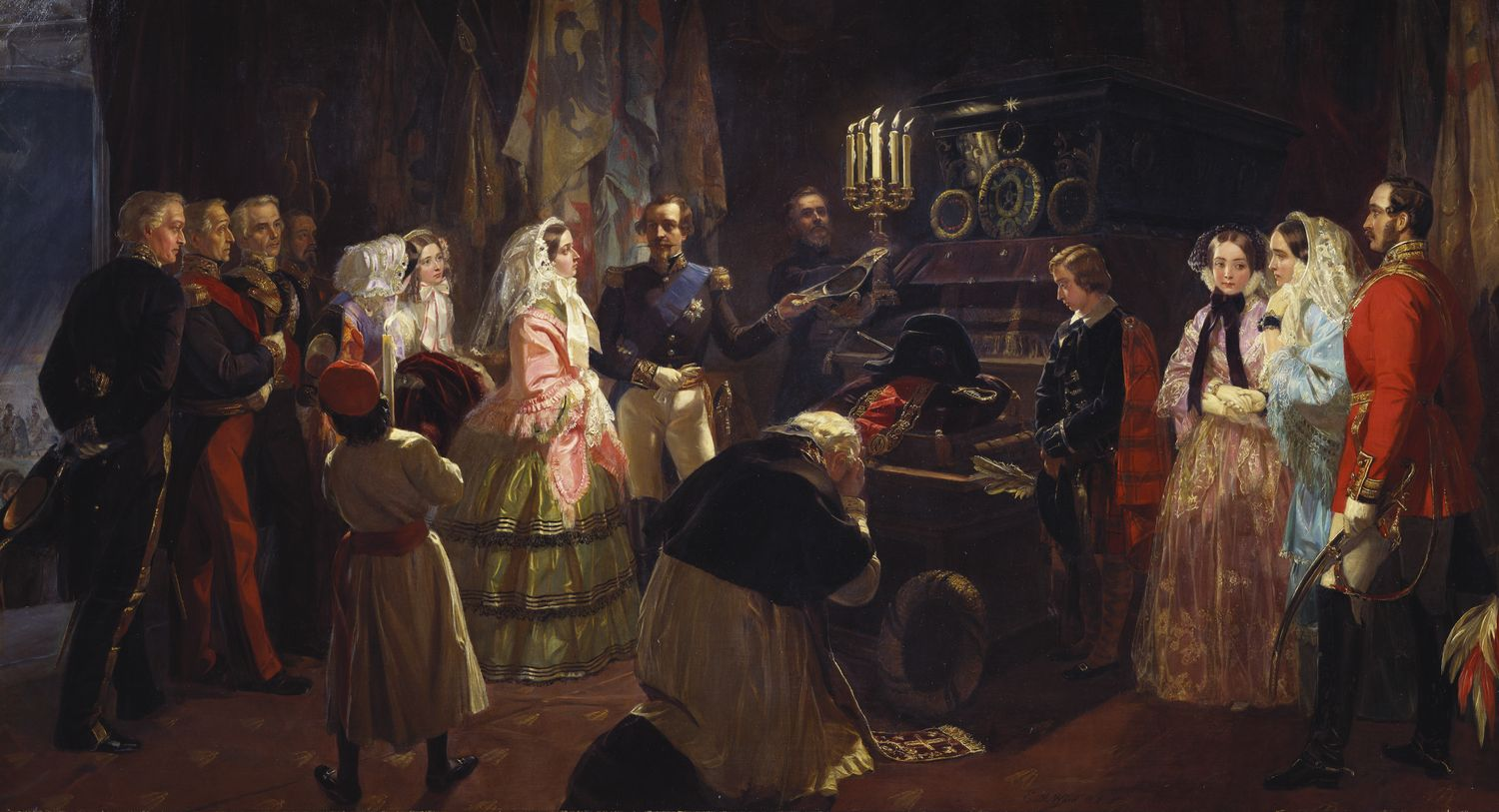
Queen Victoria at the Tomb of Napoleon by Edward Matthew Ward. Queen Victoria visiting Napoleon's temporary tomb in the Invalides, 1855

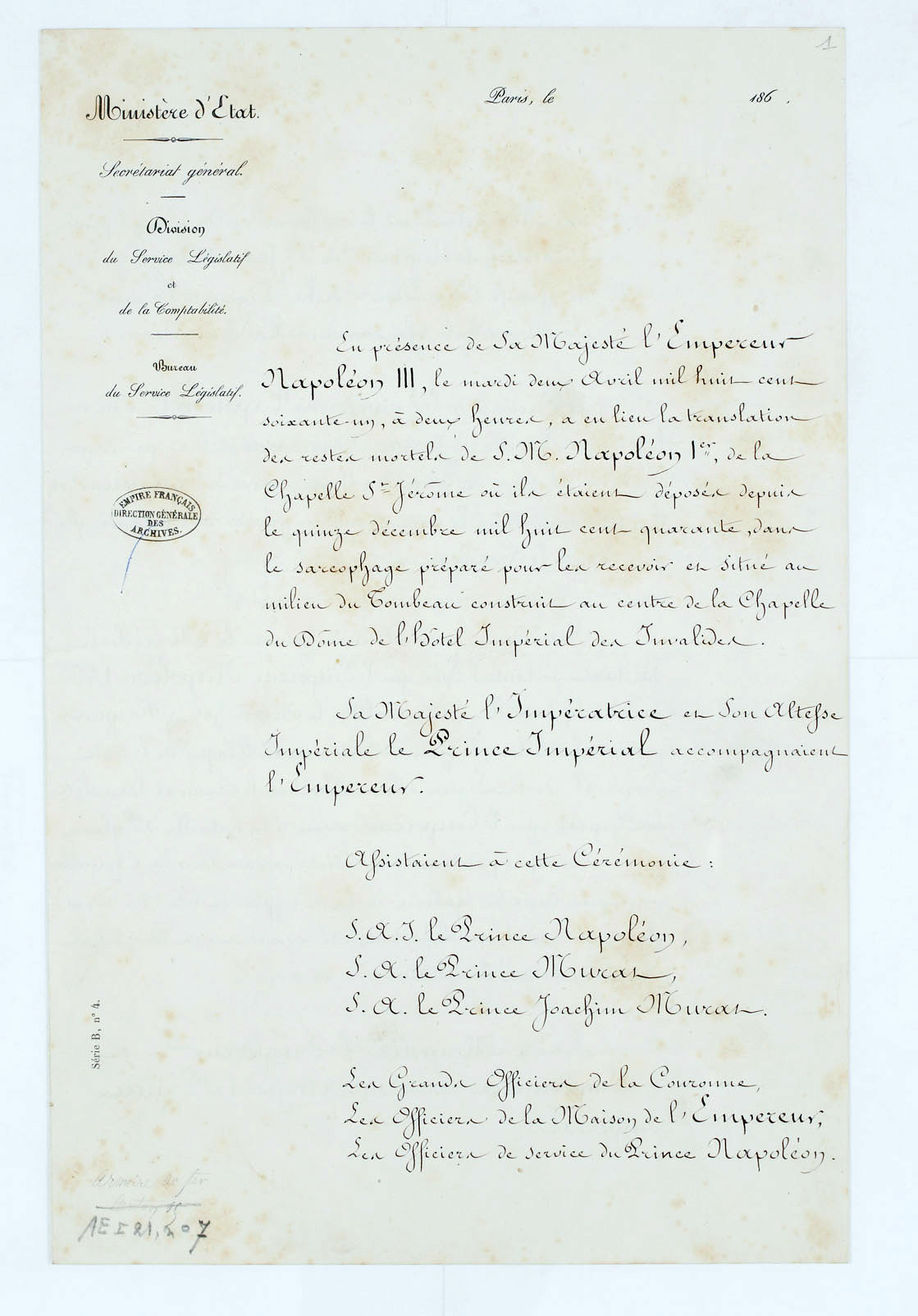
Memorandum of the translation ceremony on 2 April 1861

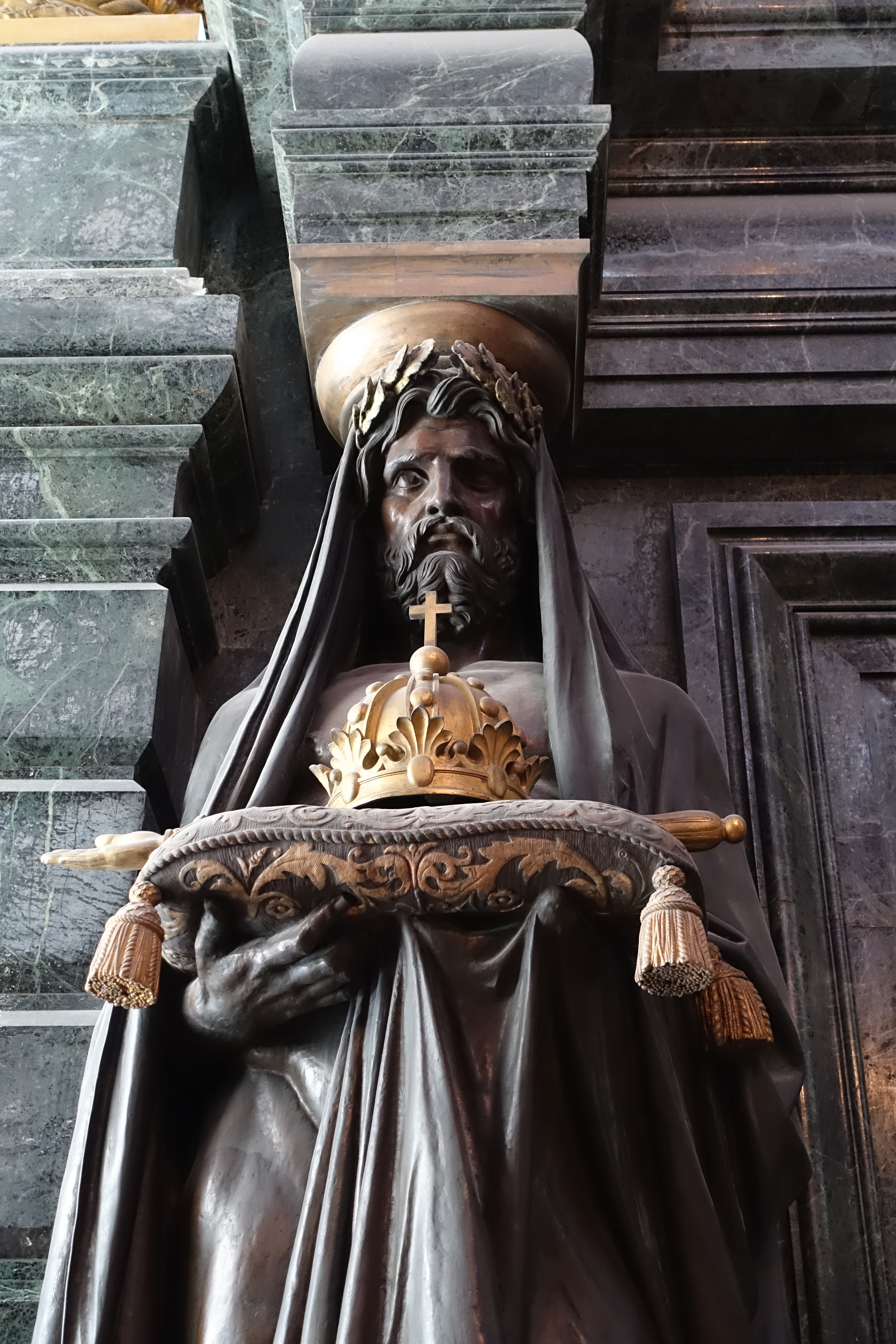
Atlante holding the Crown of Napoleon and the Main de justice (Duret)

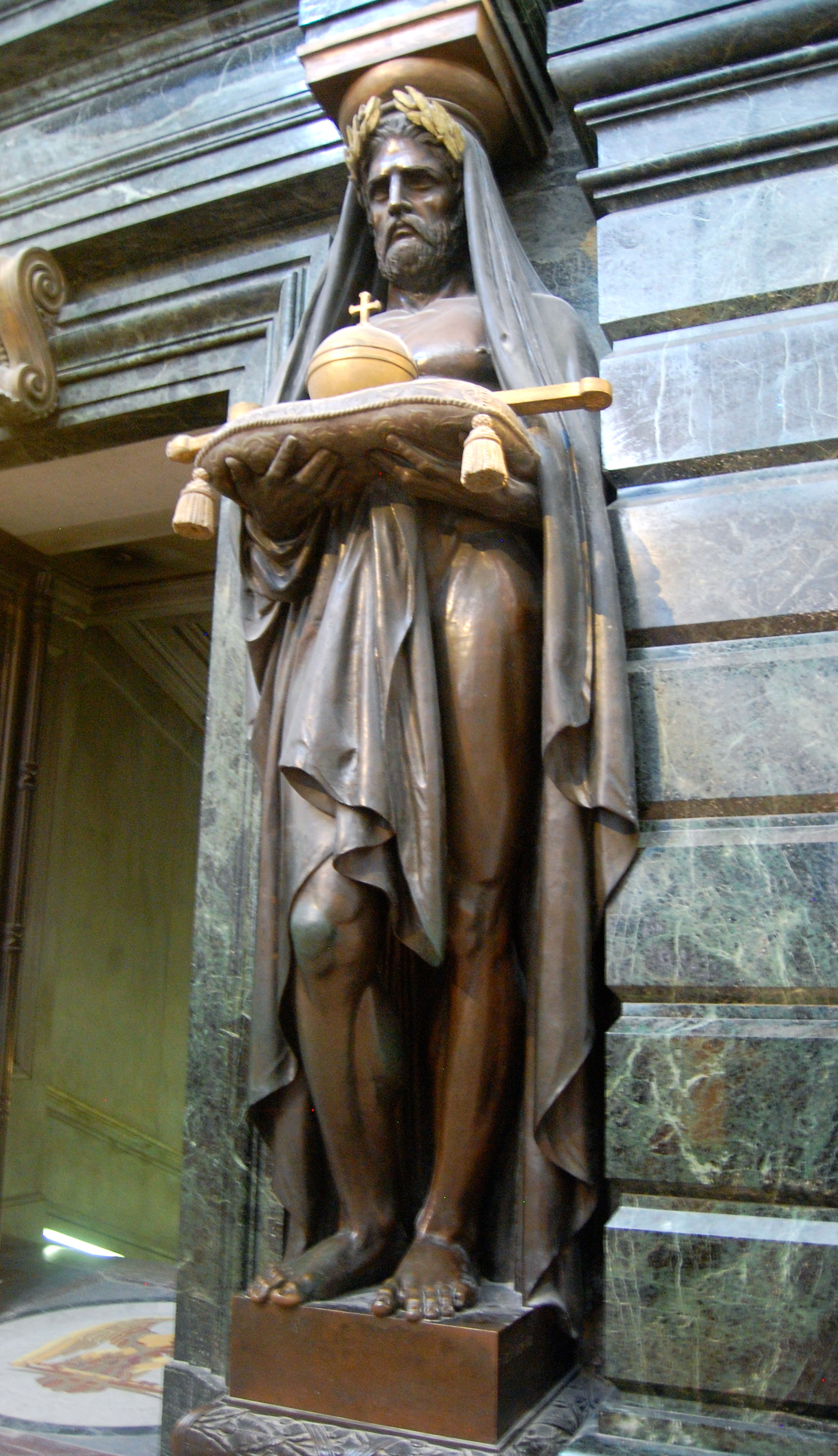
Atlante holding the imperial orb and sword (Duret)

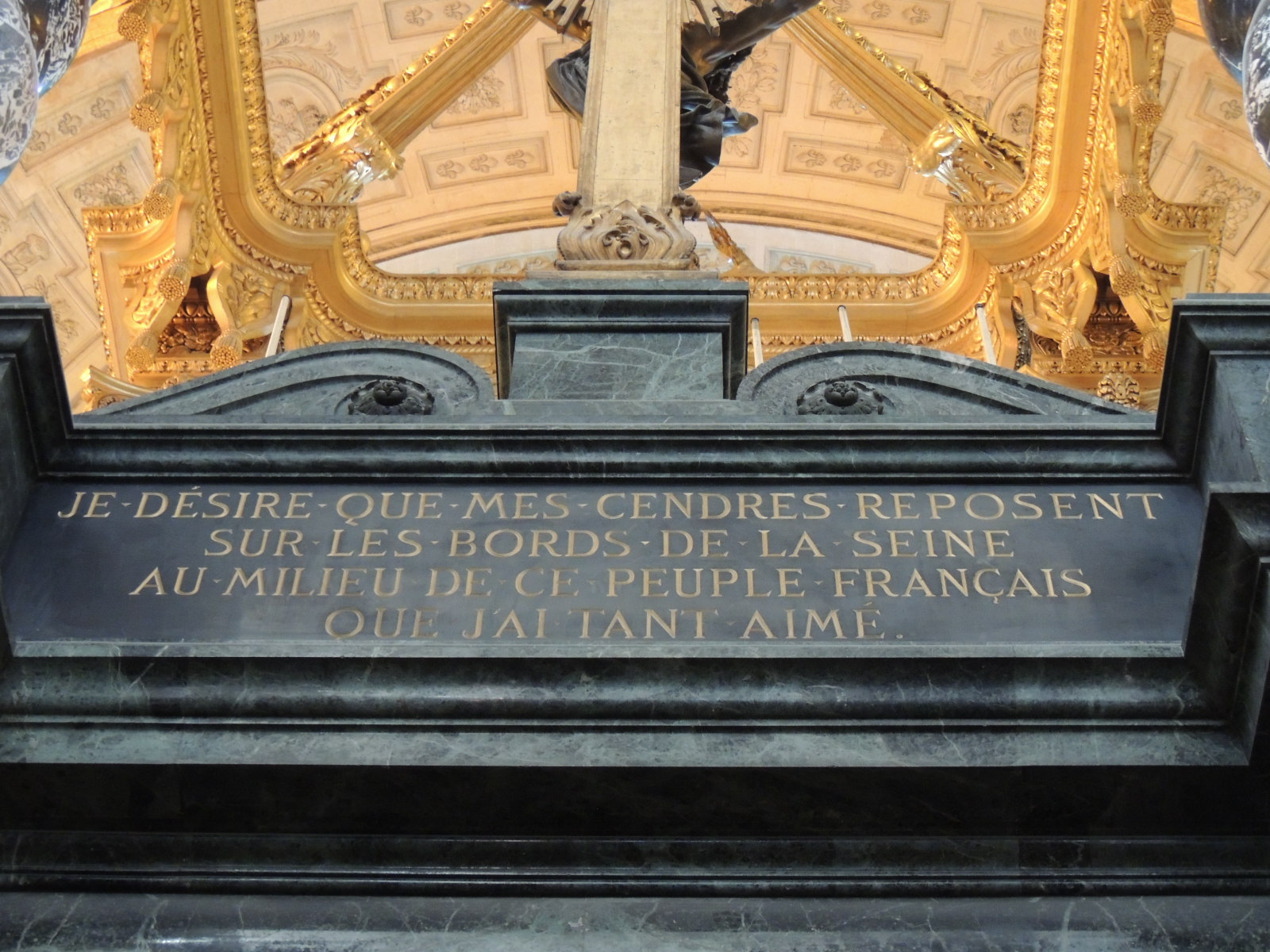
Inscription recalling Napoleon's wish to be buried in Paris

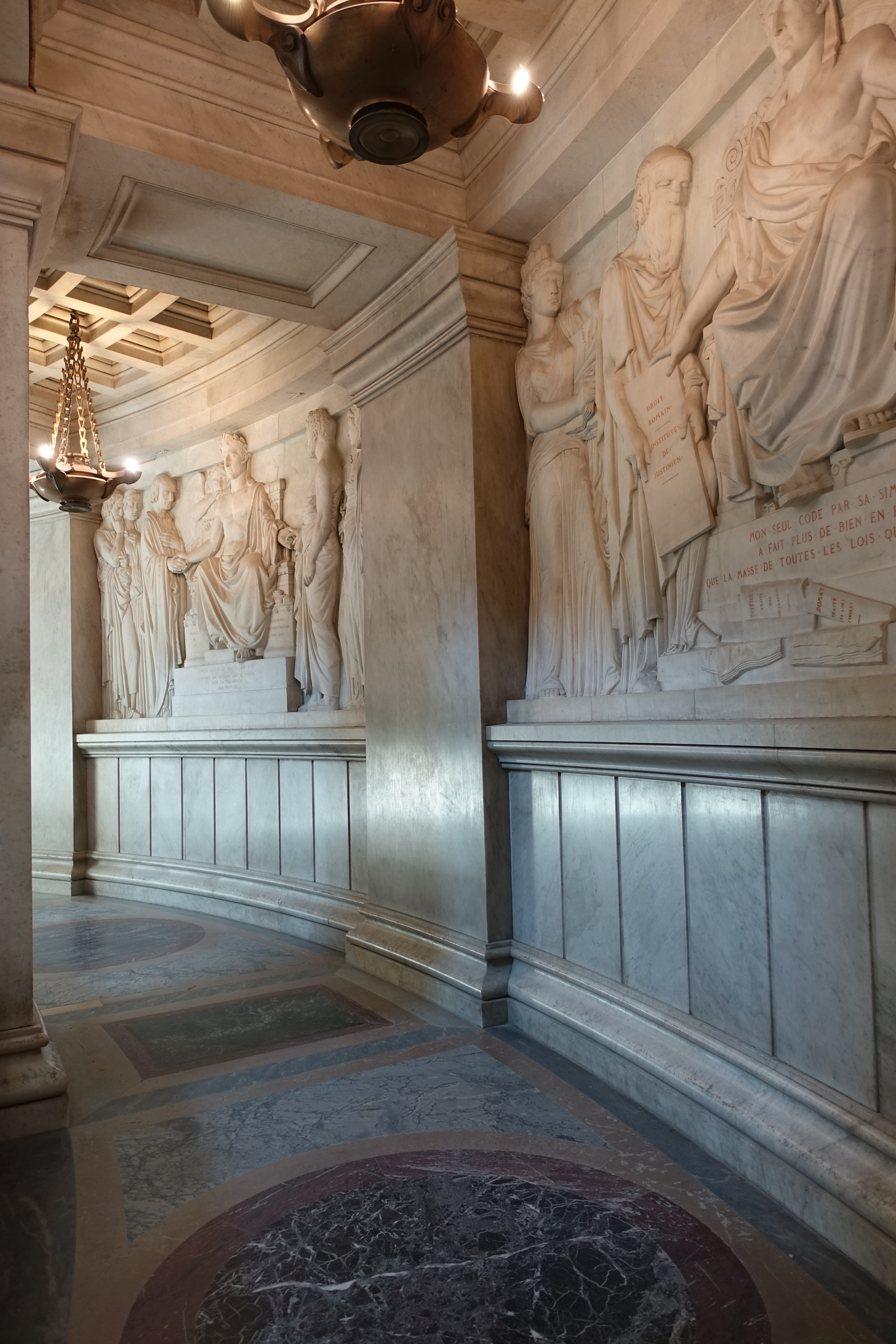
Circular gallery with Simart's reliefs

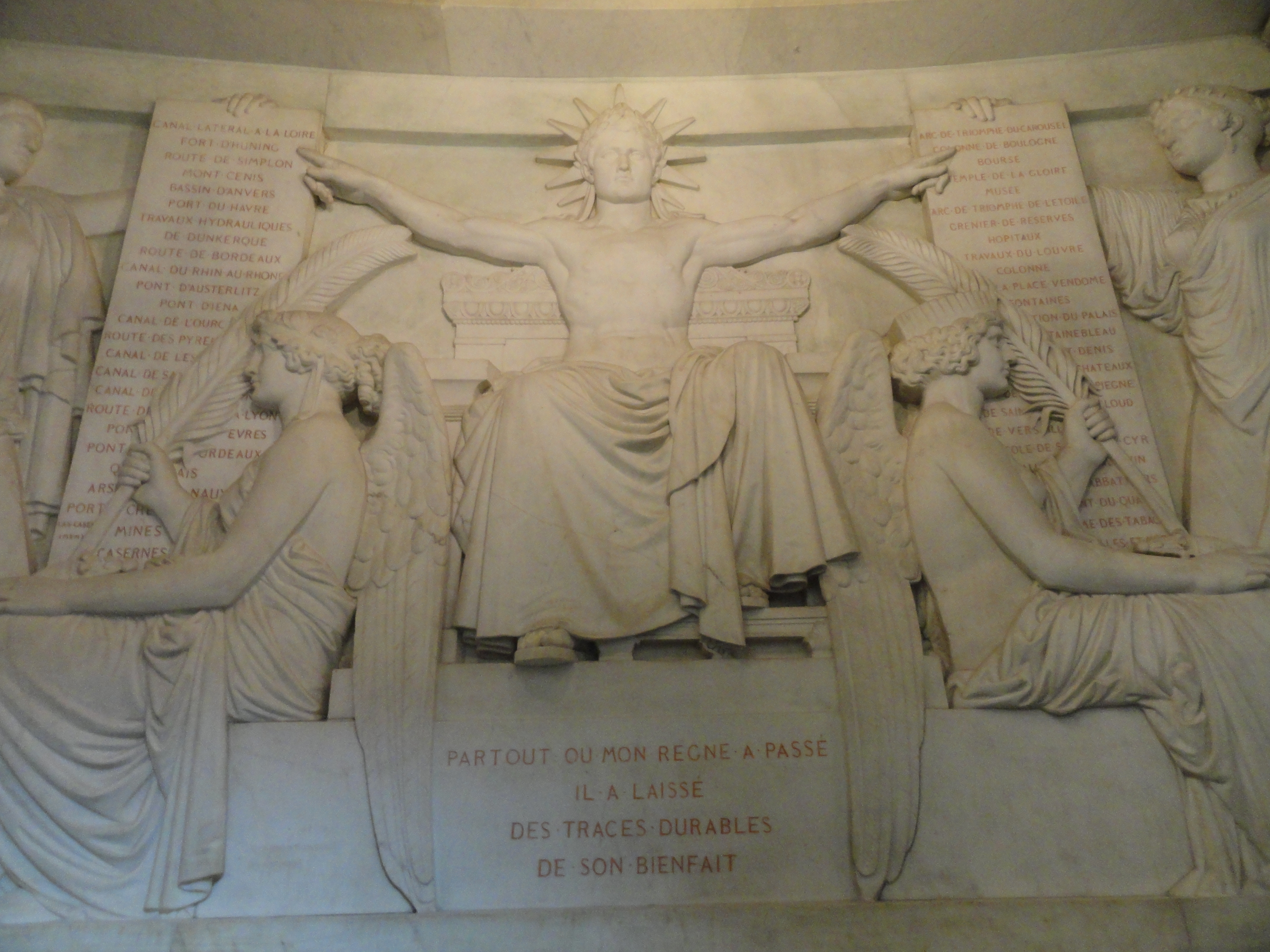
Grands travaux (Simart)

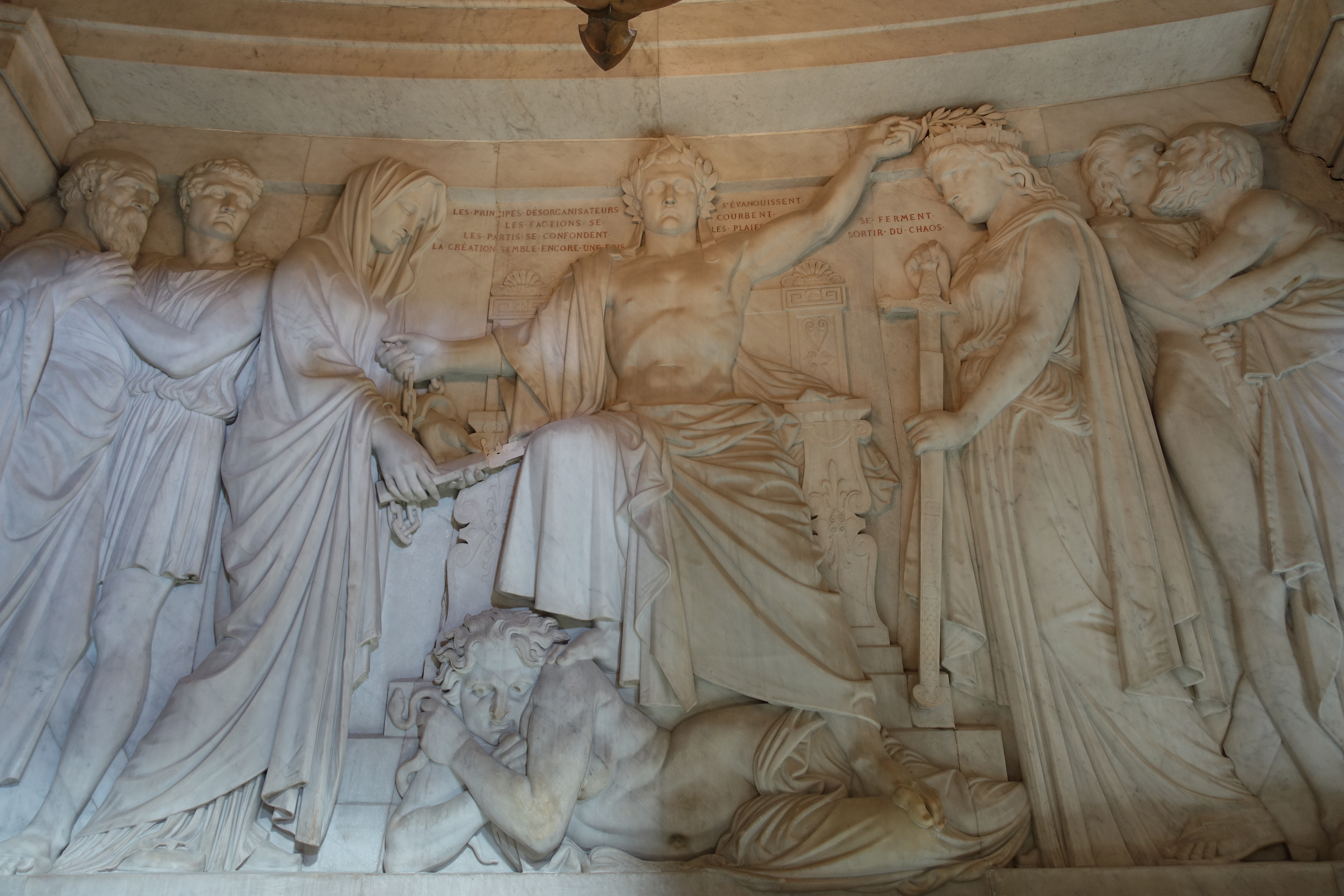
Pacification (Simart)

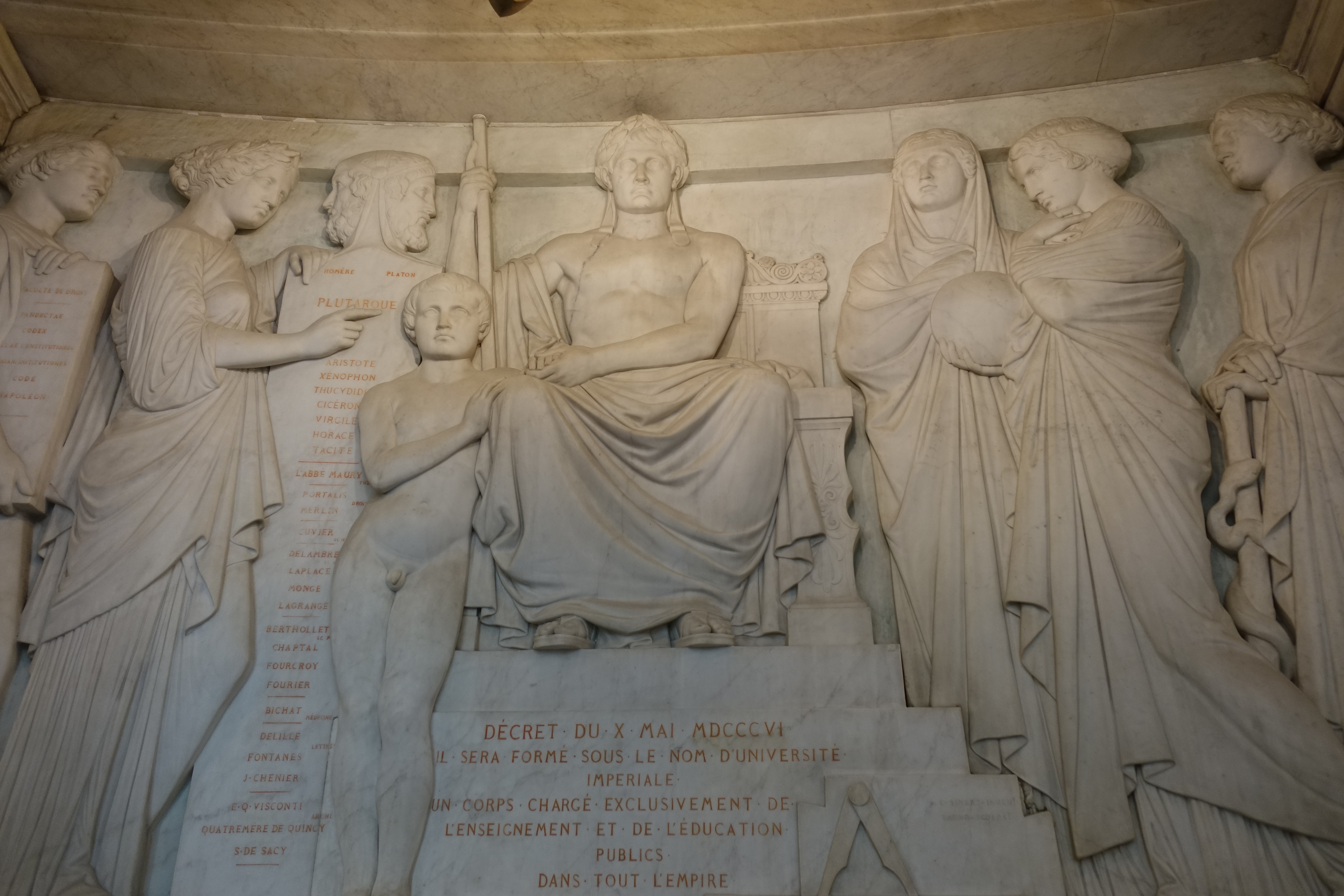
Université impériale (Simart)

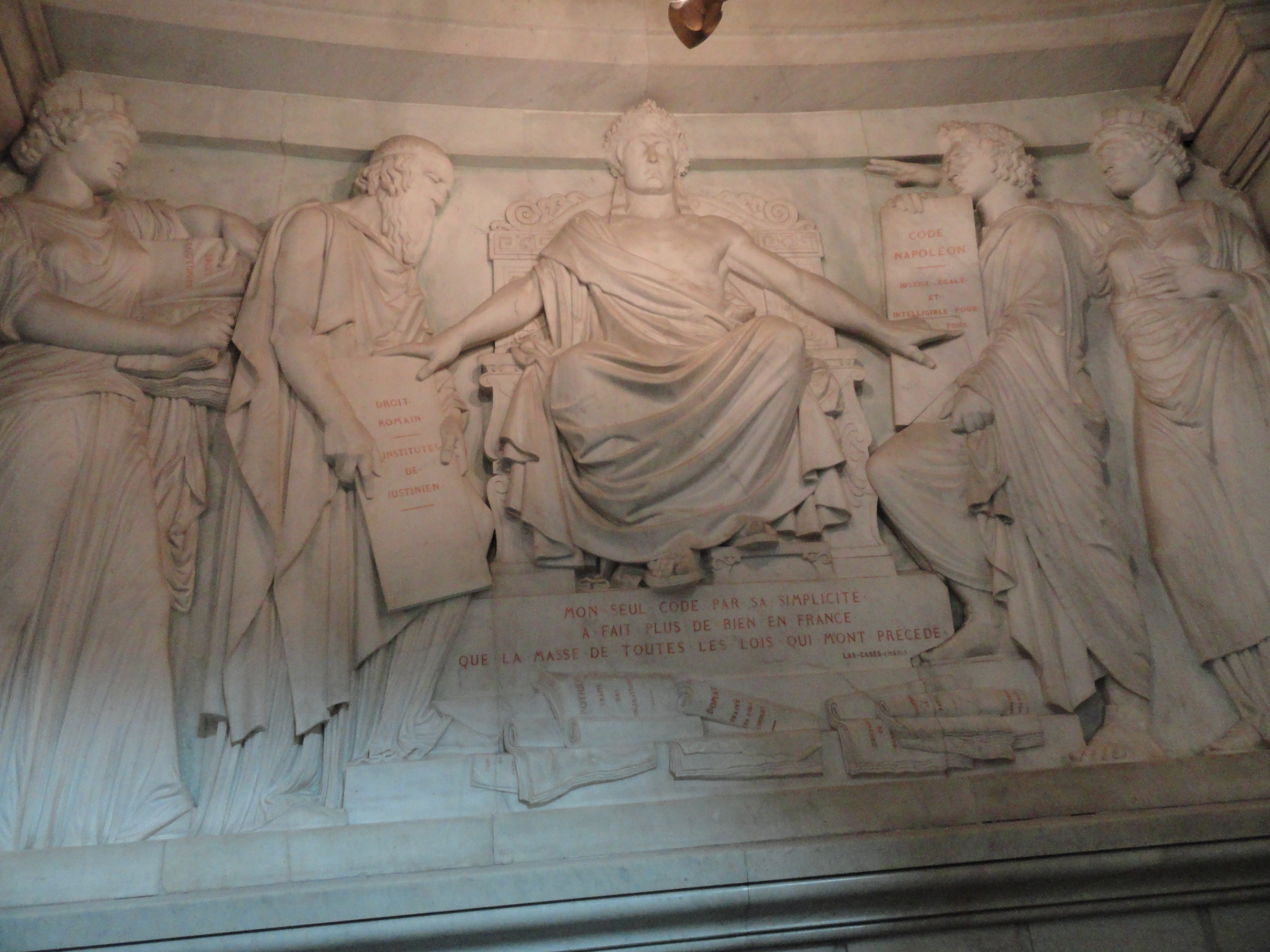
Code civil (Simart)

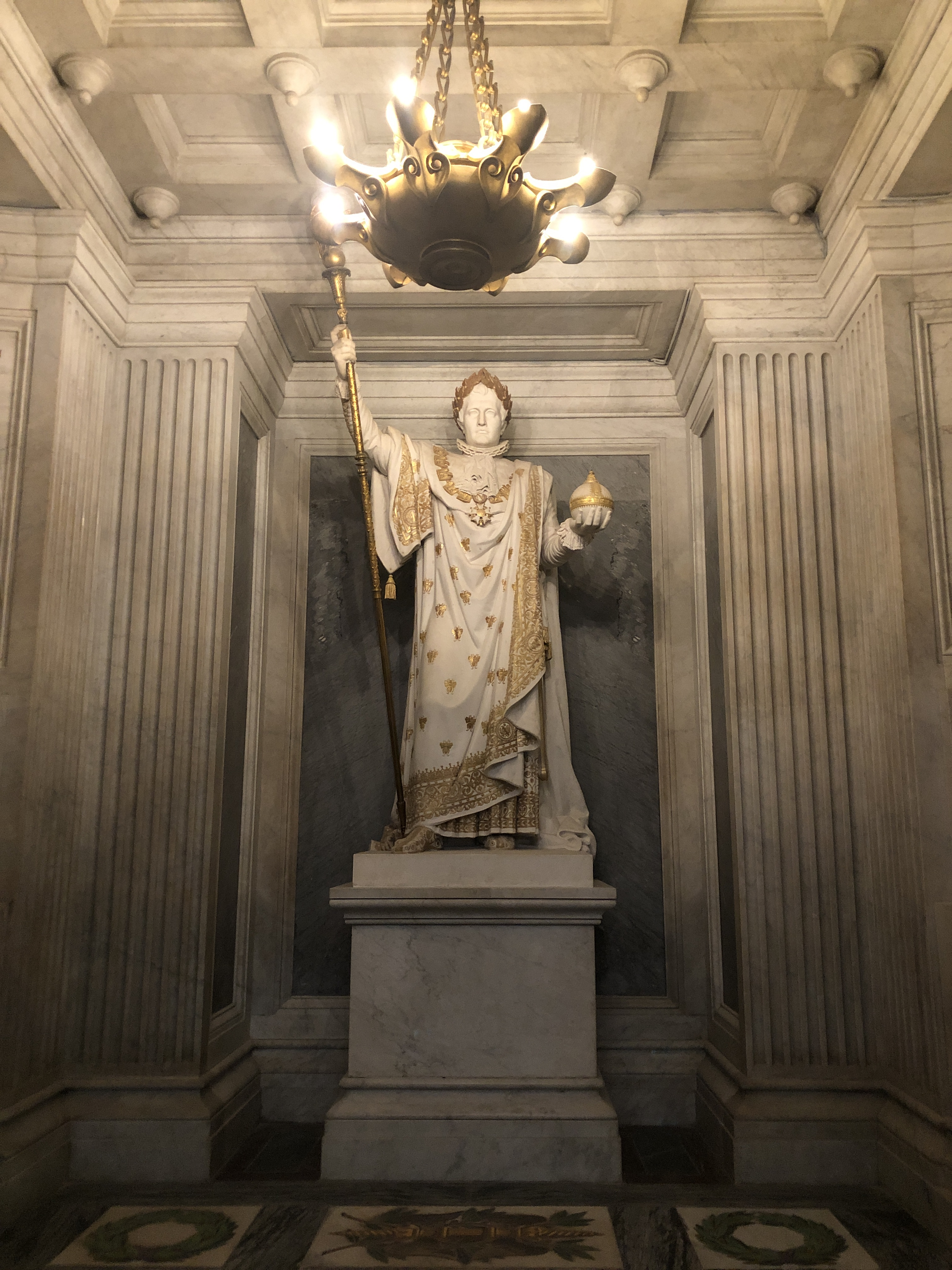
Tomb of Napoleon II and Simart's statue in the cella

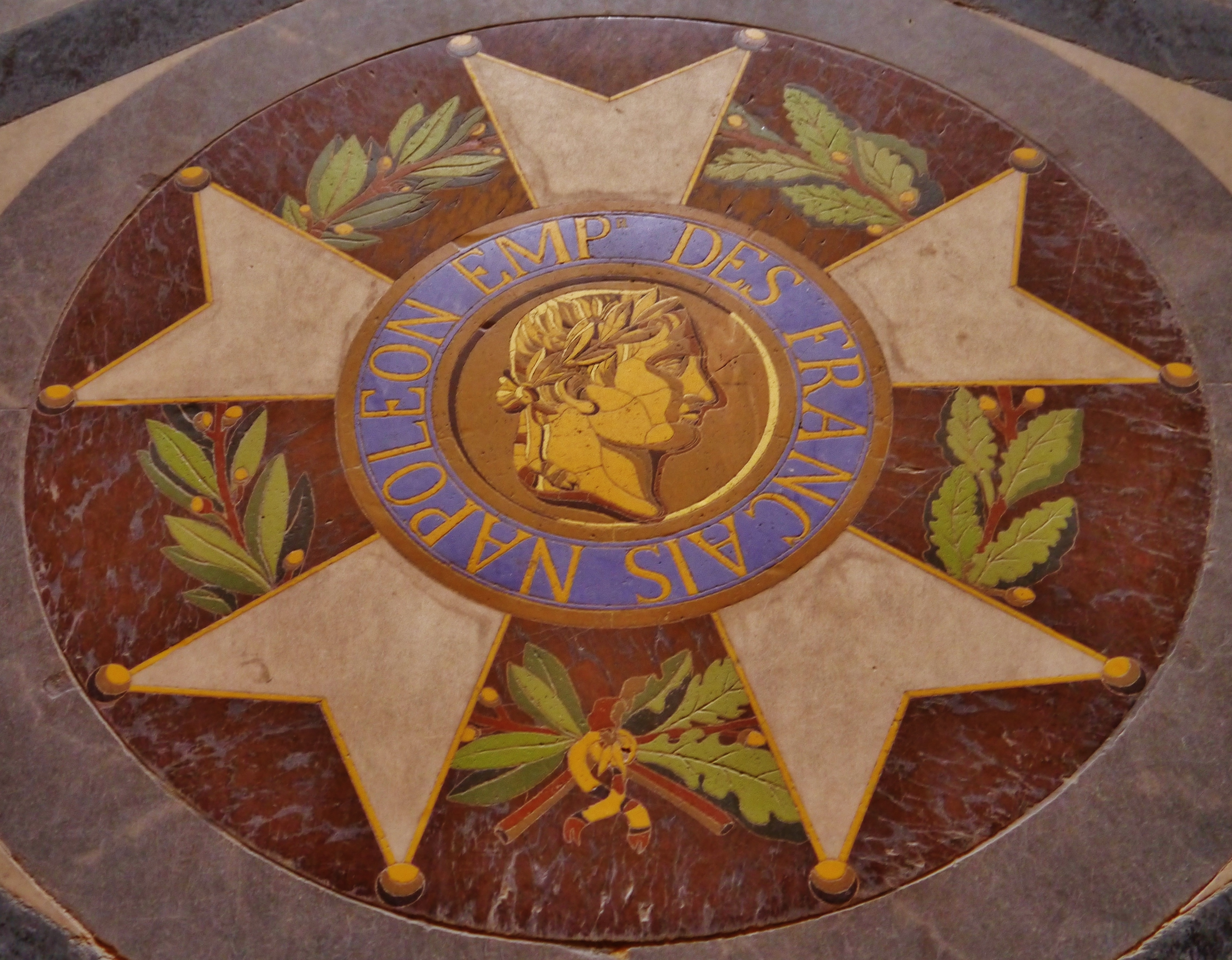
Stone mosaic of the Legion of Honour

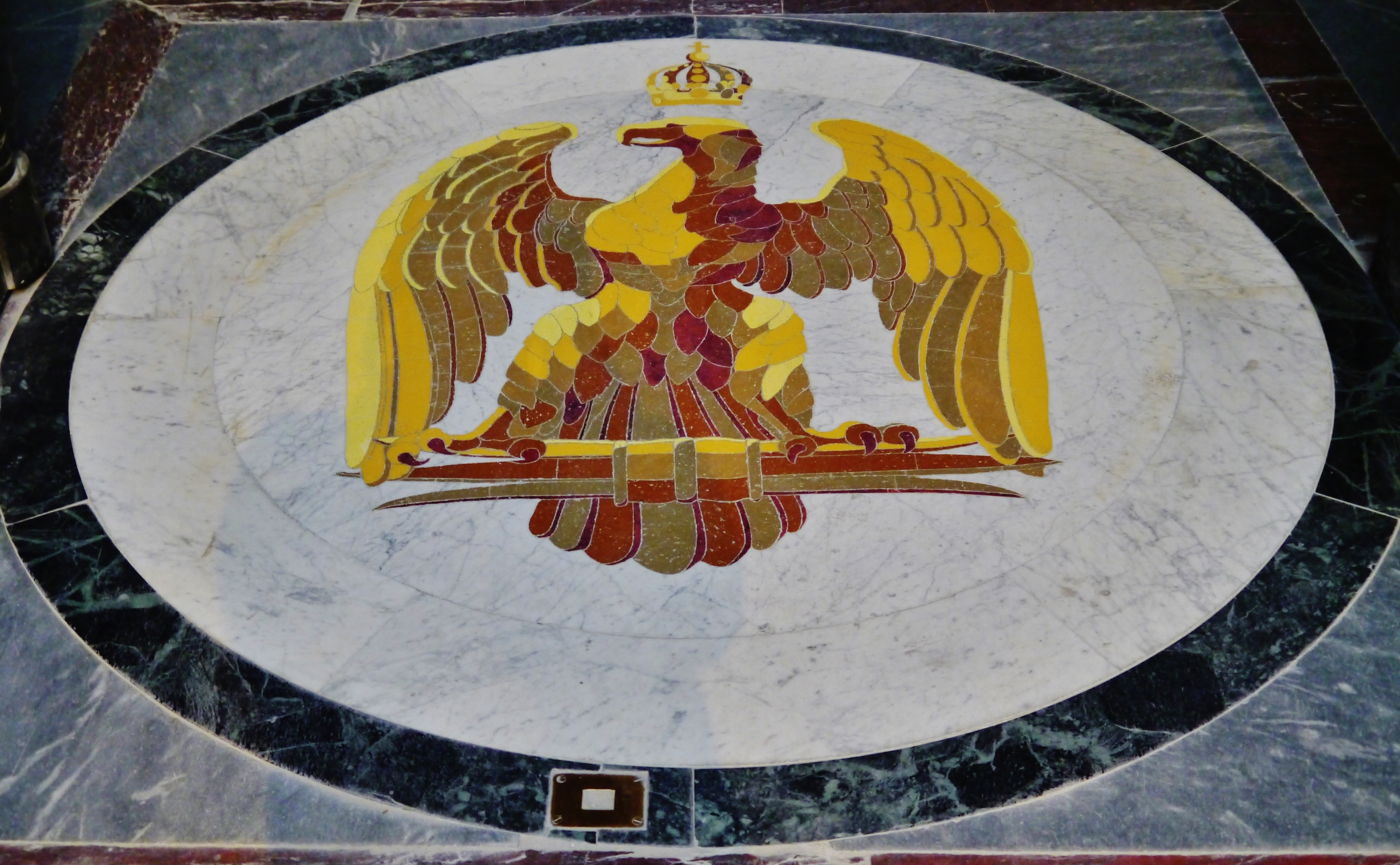
Stone mosaic of the imperial eagle

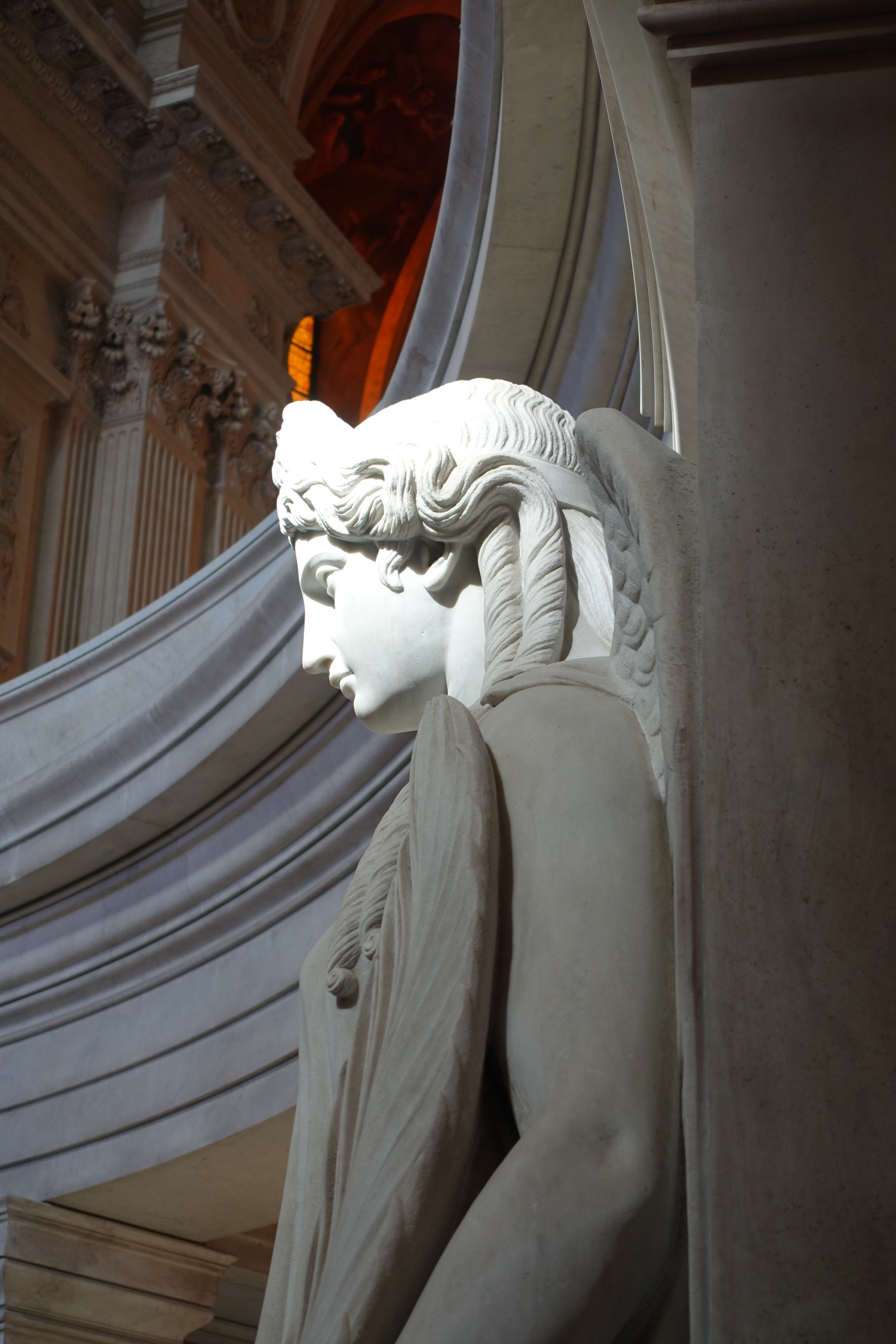
One of Pradier's victories

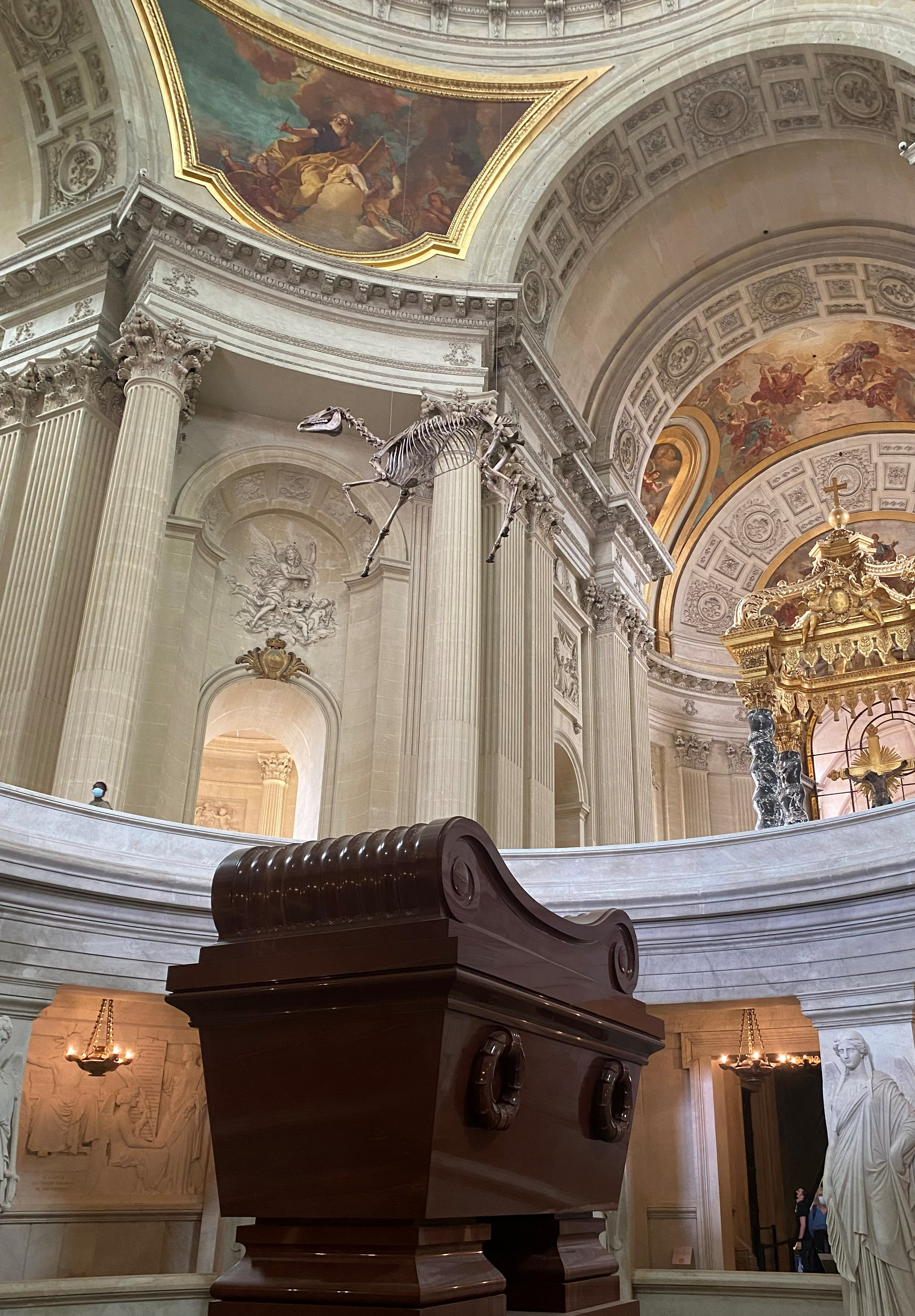
Memento Marengo installation by Pascal Convert above the tomb, 2021

== See also ==
- Equestrian statue of Napoleon
