= Hôtel de Ville, Rouen =

Town hall in Rouen, France

Hôtel de Ville
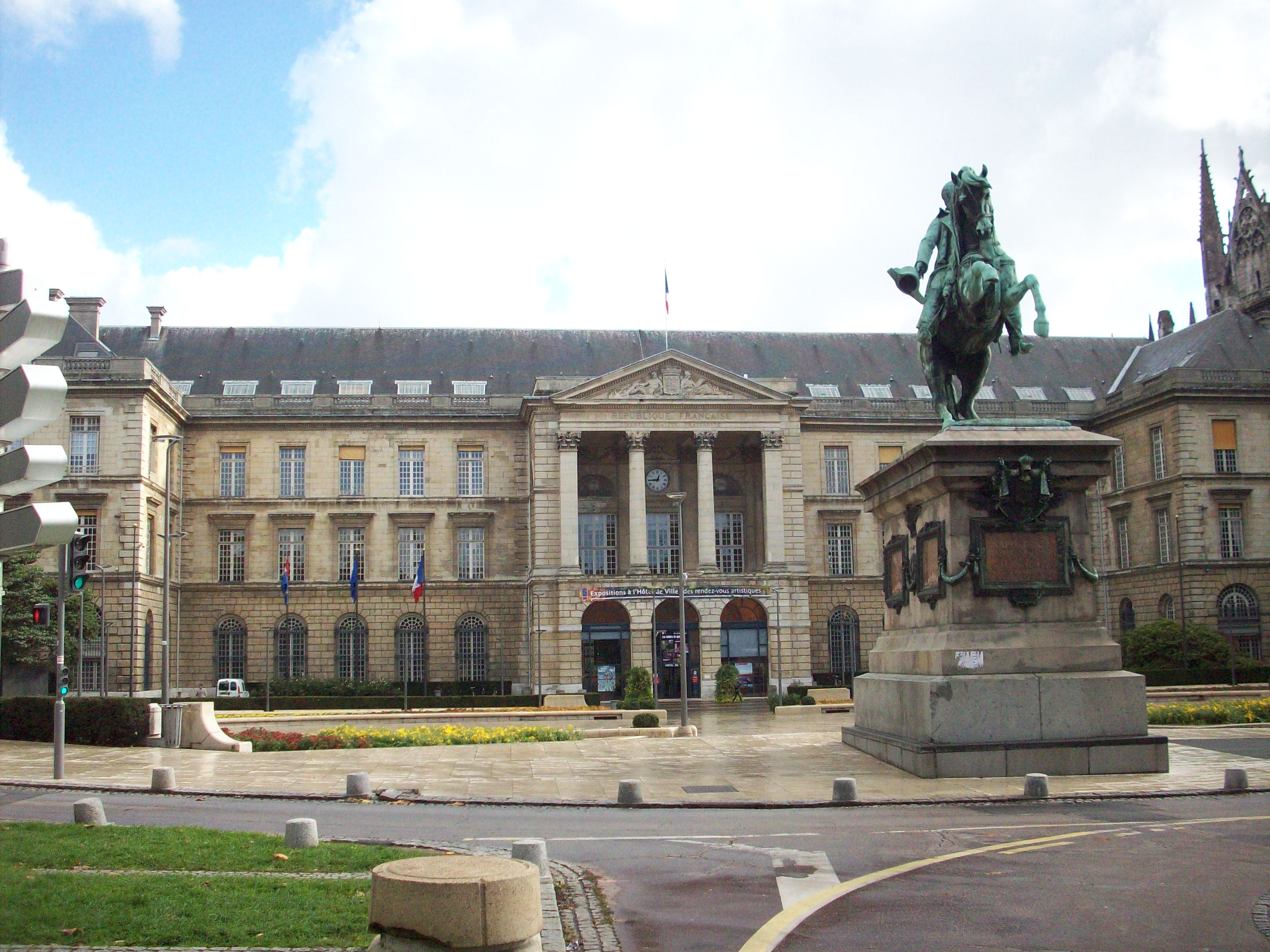
- Main frontage of the Hôtel de Ville in October 2010

General information
- Type: City hall
- Architectural style: Neoclassical style
- Location: Rouen, France
- Coordinates: 49.4432°N 1.1000°E
- Completed: 1825

Design and construction
- Architects: Jean-Pierre Defrance, Jean-Baptiste Le Brument and Charles-Felix Maillet du Boullay

Monument historique
- Official name: Hôtel de ville
- Type: Inscrit
- Designated: 1948
- Reference no.: PA00100851

The Hôtel de Ville (French pronunciation: [otɛl də vil], City Hall) is a historic building in Rouen, Seine-Maritime, northern France, standing on Place du Général de Gaulle. It has housed the city council of Rouen since 1800. The garden façade and roofs were designated a monument historique by the French government in 1948.

== History ==
=== Earlier buildings ===
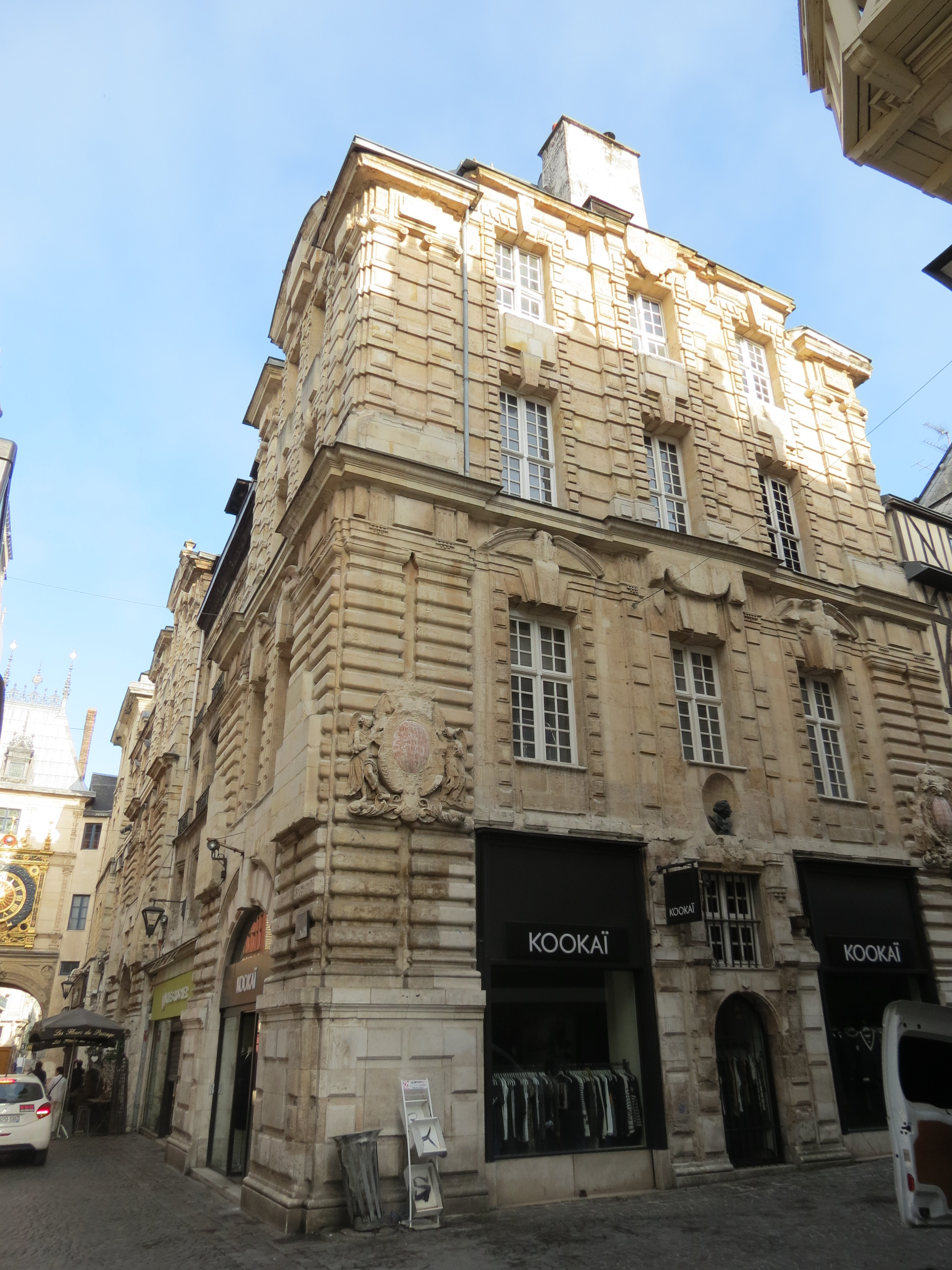
The old Hôtel de Ville on Rue du Gros-Horloge

The city council initially held its meetings in the Halle aux Marchands, close to the Église Saint-Éloi, in the mid-12th century. It then met in a building on Rue du Gros-Horloge, previously belonging to Simon de Montfort, 5th Earl of Leicester, which was granted to them by Philip II in 1220.

After the second Hôtel de Ville became dilapidated and too small to house the city council, a third Hôtel de Ville was erected on Rue du Gros-Horloge to a design by Jacques Gabriel in the Renaissance style in 1607. It was built atop the cellars of the previous building and the ground floor consisted of a series of shopping arcades.

After nearly two centuries of use, the third Hôtel de Ville became inadequate and was sold for commercial use in 1796. The façades of the former Hôtel de Ville were listed as historical monuments in 1966. In the late 18th century, the city council was briefly accommodated in the Hôtel de la Première Présidence on Rue Saint-Lô, which had been designed by Jean-Jacques Martinet and completed in 1721.

=== Current building ===
The current Hôtel de Ville was established in the former dormitories of the monks of Saint-Ouen Abbey on a site to the immediate north of the abbey. It was designed by Jean-Pierre Defrance and Jean-Baptiste Le Brument in the neoclassical style, built in ashlar stone and was completed in the mid-18th century. However, it became vacant upon its deconsecration in 1790 and the city council decided to acquire the former abbey dormitories and moved into the building in May 1800. A programme of works to convert the former dormitories into a municipal building was carried out to a design by Charles-Felix Maillet du Boullay and was completed in 1825.

The design involved a symmetrical main frontage of 19 bays facing onto a new square, with the end sections of the three bays each projected forward as pavilions. The ground floor was rusticated and arcaded with a series of round headed openings. The central section of three bays, which was also projected forward, featured a tetrastyle portico on the first floor: it was formed by Corinthian order columns supporting an entablature and a modillioned pediment, with a coat of arms in the tympanum. The building was fenestrated by casement windows with moulded surrounds and cornices and, at roof level, there was a balustraded parapet. Internally, although the principal room was the council chamber, there was a public library on the first floor and a museum on the second floor.

An equestrian statue of Napoleon by the sculptor, Gabriel-Vital Dubray, was unveiled in front of the building by the industrialist, Henri Barbet, on 15 August 1865. The building was badly damaged in a fire on the night of 30 December 1926 and, although the paintings and statues were saved, the municipal archives from 1800 to 1926 were destroyed. The building was subsequently restored to a design by Edmond Lair.

The Hôtel de Ville was occupied by German forces starting in June 1940. On 19 April 1944, during the Second World War, the building was damaged by American aerial bombing. Following the liberation of the town by Canadian troops on 30 August 1944, the French tricolour flag was hoisted on the building by local residents.

== Sources ==
- Cook, Theodore Andrea (1899). The Story of Rouen. J. M. Dent & Co.
- Liquet, François-Isidore (1862). Rouen, son histoire, ses monuments etc. A. Lebrument.
