= Annie Lami =

Annie Lami was an Italian literary translator, "a prolific translator of Anglo-American novels and short stories".

Her 1933 translation (with Adriano Lami) of Dubliners into Italian in 193 was "a literary event which passed nearly unnoticed". Lami's translations had to cope with the restrictions imposed by Fascist censorship in Italy.

== Works ==
=== Translations ===
- Pallieter. Translation from the Dutch Pallieter by Felix Timmermans. Milan: Delta, 1929.
- Il pozzo della solitudine: romanzo. Translation from the English The Well of Loneliness by Radclyffe Hall. Milan: Dall'Oglio, 1930. Introduction by Guido da Verona.
- La stirpe di Adamo: romanzo. Translation from the English Adam's Breed by Radclyffe Hall. Milan: Corbaccio, 1932.
- (Tr. with Adriano Lami) Gente di Dublino. Translation from the English Dubliners by James Joyce. Milan: Corbaccio, 1933.
- Estaci [Ecstasy]. Translation from the English Wolf Solent by John Cowper Powys. 1935.
- Via della magnolia: romanzo. Translation from the English Magnolia Street by Louis Golding. 1938
- (Tr. with Maria Allesandri) I marciapiedi di New York. Translation from the English East Side, West Side by Marcia Davenport. Milan: Corbaccio Dall'oglio, 1949.

=== Other ===
- (ed.) Le migliori pagini dello Sterne by Laurence Sterne. Milan: Signorelli, 1931
- (ed. with introduction and notes) Buffon: extraits by Georges-Louis Leclerc, Comte de Buffon, 1932.
