= Lamy (surname) =

Lamy is a surname. Notable people with the surname include:

== A–C ==
- Alexandra Lamy (born 1971), French actress
- Amédée-François Lamy (1858–1900), French military officer
- Benoît Lamy (1945–2008), Belgian motion picture writer and director
- Bernard Lamy (1640–1715), French theologian and mathematician
- Brigitte Lamy (born 1950), French curler
- Charles Lamy (1857–1940), French actor
- Charles Lamy (New York politician) (1849–?), American merchant and politician
- C. Josef Lamy (fl. 1930s–?), German pen manufacturer, founder of Lamy
- Claude-Auguste Lamy (1820–1878), French chemist

== D–I ==
- Étienne Lamy (1845–1919), French political writer
- François Lamy (politician) (born 1959), French politician
- François Lamy (theologian) (1636–1711), French Benedictine ascetical and apologetic writer
- Gérard Lamy (1919–2016), Québécois-Canadian politician
- Guillaume Lamy (1644–1683), French physician and Epicurean materialist
- Ingmari Lamy (born 1947), Swedish fashion model

== J–O ==
- James Lamy (1928–1992) American bobsledder
- Jason Lamy-Chappuis (born 1986), Franco-American skier
- Jean Lamy, French slalom canoeist
- Jean-Baptiste Lamy (1814–1888), French Catholic archbishop
- Jean-Claude Lamy (1941–2025), French journalist, writer and publisher
- Jehan Lamy (fl. 1540s), author of Le langaige du Bresil
- Jenny Lamy (born 1949), Australian sprinter
- Jerome Lamy (1726–1781), Austrian Benedictine Biblical scholar, writer and educator
- Joseph Alfred Lamy (Lamy Père; 1850–1919), French archetier (maker of bows for musical string instruments)

== P–Z ==
- Pascal Lamy (born 1947), French politician and World Trade Organization Director-General
- Pedro Lamy (born 1972), Portuguese automobile racer
- Peronet Lamy (died before 1453), Gothic painter and manuscript illuminator
- Pierre-Henri Lamy (born 1987), French footballer
- Pierre Marie Édouard Lamy de la Chapelle (1804–1886), French botanist
- Steven Lamy, American international relations professor
- Thomas Joseph Lamy (1827–1927), Belgian Biblical scholar and Orientalist
- Vincent Lamy (born 1999), Canadian soccer player
