= Alphonse Lami =

French sculptor and Egyptologist (1822–1867)

- Born: 22 June 1822; Paris, France
- Died: 17 July 1867 (aged 45); Alexandria, Egypt
- Education: Ecole des Beaux-Arts
- Occupations: Sculpture, Egyptologist
- Family: Stanislas Lami (son)
- Awards: Legion d'honneur

Alphonse Lami (22 June 1822 in Paris – 17 July 1867 in Alexandria) was a French sculptor and Egyptologist of Italian descent.

== Biography ==
Lami was the son of François Lami, the illegitimate son of prince Francesco Borghese) and Louise Hélène Heim (granddaughter of Jean-Baptiste Nicolet. He joined the Ecole des Beaux-Arts on 7 October 1846, studying under Abel de Pujol and Francisque Duret.

He first exhibited at the Académie des Beaux-Arts's Paris Salon of 1850 with a marble statue entitled "Liseuse". He then went to Egypt where from 1852 to 1853 he took part in the excavation of the Serapeum of Saqqara, which were headed by his friend Auguste Mariette.

Returning to Paris, he married Alexandrine-Marie Bidauld (granddaughter of the rural painter and member of the Académie des Beaux-Arts Jean-Joseph-Xavier Bidauld) in 1853 - their son Stanislas Lami was a noted sculptor and art writer - and devoted himself to studying artistic anatomy and produced a flayed or écorche figure digging with a shovel, which he exhibited at the Salon of 1857. This work was also presented at the Académie des Sciences and was the report of an ecology written in the name of MM. Claude Bernard, Pierre Rayer, Horace Vernet and Jean Louis Armand de Quatrefages de Bréau. Later, in 1861, Lami published an album of engravings after this écorché under the title "Myologie superficielle du corps humain". Lami was made a knight of the Légion d'honneur on 12 August 1859.

In 1865, Alphonse Lami took part in the scientific commission sent to Mexico by the ministry of public instruction. Suffering from a liver disease he had caught from his stay in the tropics, he unwisely undertook a new trip to Egypt on his return to France from Mexico. He arrived in Alexandria when his condition suddenly worsened and he died there in July 1867.

== Works ==
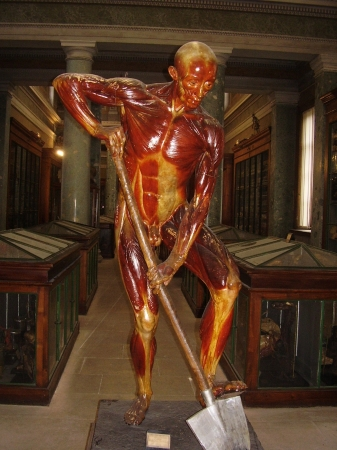
L' Écorché, by Alphonse Lami (Musée d'Anatomie de Montpellier)

- Bust of Michel Chevalier
- Liseuse, exhibited at the Salon of 1850
- L'Ecorché, exhibited at the 1857 Salon, Musée d'Anatomie de Montpellier

== Sources ==
- Archives de la Seine.
- La Parentèle de Charles et Yvonne de Gaulle
- Dictionnaire des sculpteurs du XIX° siècle by Stanislas Lami.
