= Lami, Rio Grande do Sul =

Neighbourhood in Porto Alegre, Brazil

Coordinates: 30°14′S 51°05′W

Lami
- Bairro
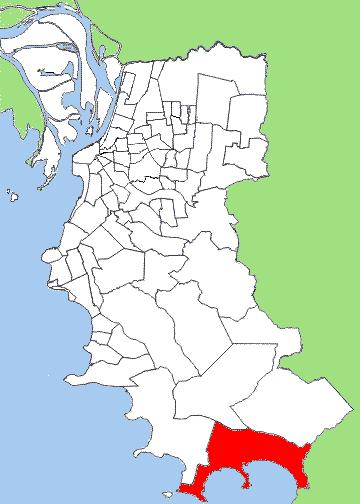
- View of Lami
- Interactive map of Lami
- Country: Brazil
- State: Rio Grande do Sul
- Municipality: Porto Alegre

Area
  - Total: 17.495 km^{2} (6.755 sq mi)

Population (2022 census)
  - Total: 6,677

Lami is a neighbourhood (bairro) in the far south of Porto Alegre, the capital of the Brazilian state of Rio Grande do Sul. It lies on the shore of the Guaíba, at the boundary with the municipality of Viamão. At the 2022 census it had 6,677 inhabitants. The bairro was named and delimited by municipal Law 6,893 of September 12, 1991; its present boundaries were set by Law 12,112 of August 22, 2016, which replaced the 1991 law.

== History ==
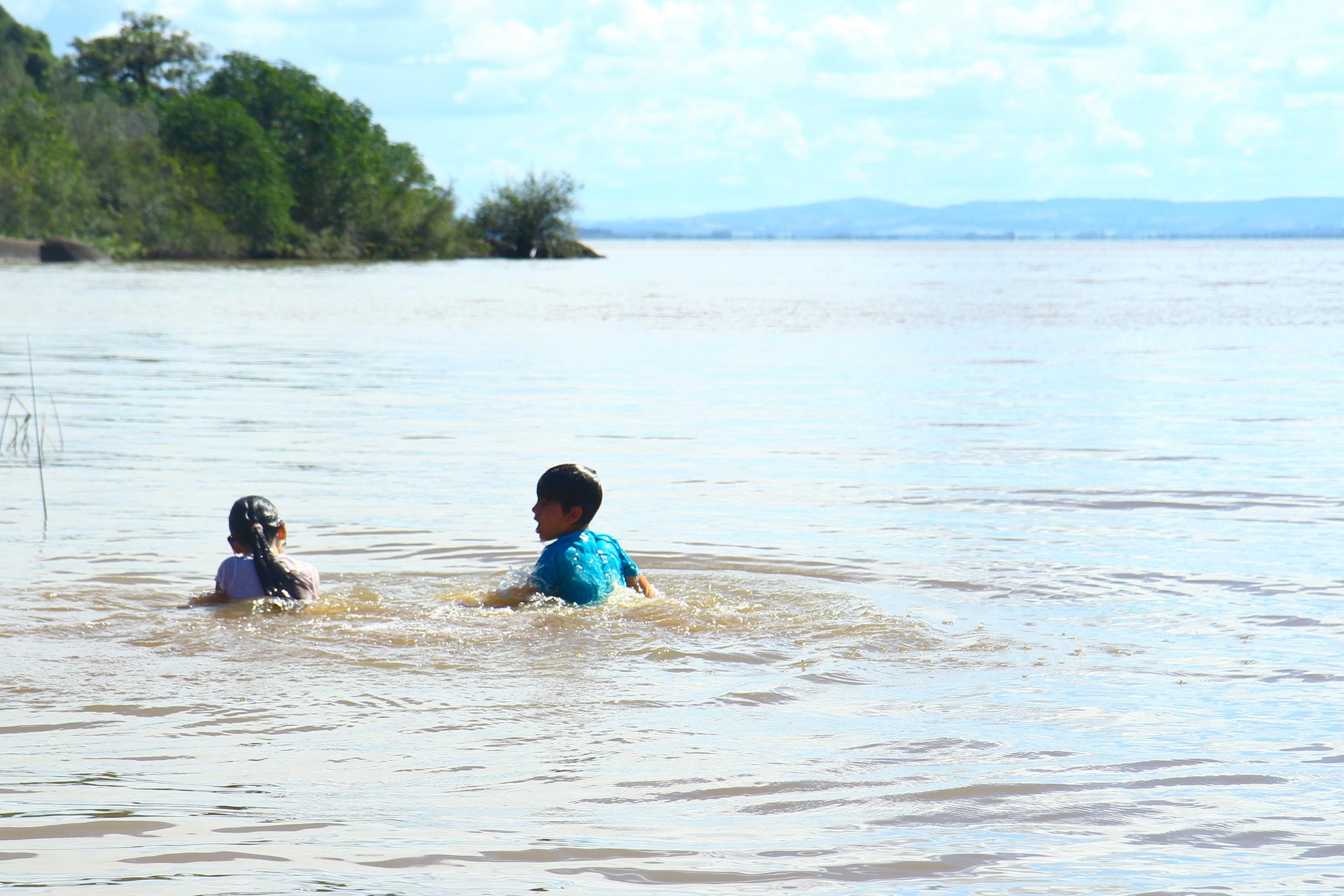
Bathers in the Guaíba at Lami beach, 2018

Until the 1970s, Lami was an isolated fishing settlement. Its inhabitants could live from fishing, because the waters of the Guaíba were not yet unfit for it, but the lack of a road link with the city centre kept the fishermen far from markets and the beach far from summer visitors. This began to change in the 1970s with the construction of a paved road from Belém Novo and the creation of the biological reserve. In the 1950s, the city had considered the area first for a housing estate and later for a recreation centre for municipal employees; both plans were dropped because the swampy ground would have required costly landfill.

== Biological reserve ==
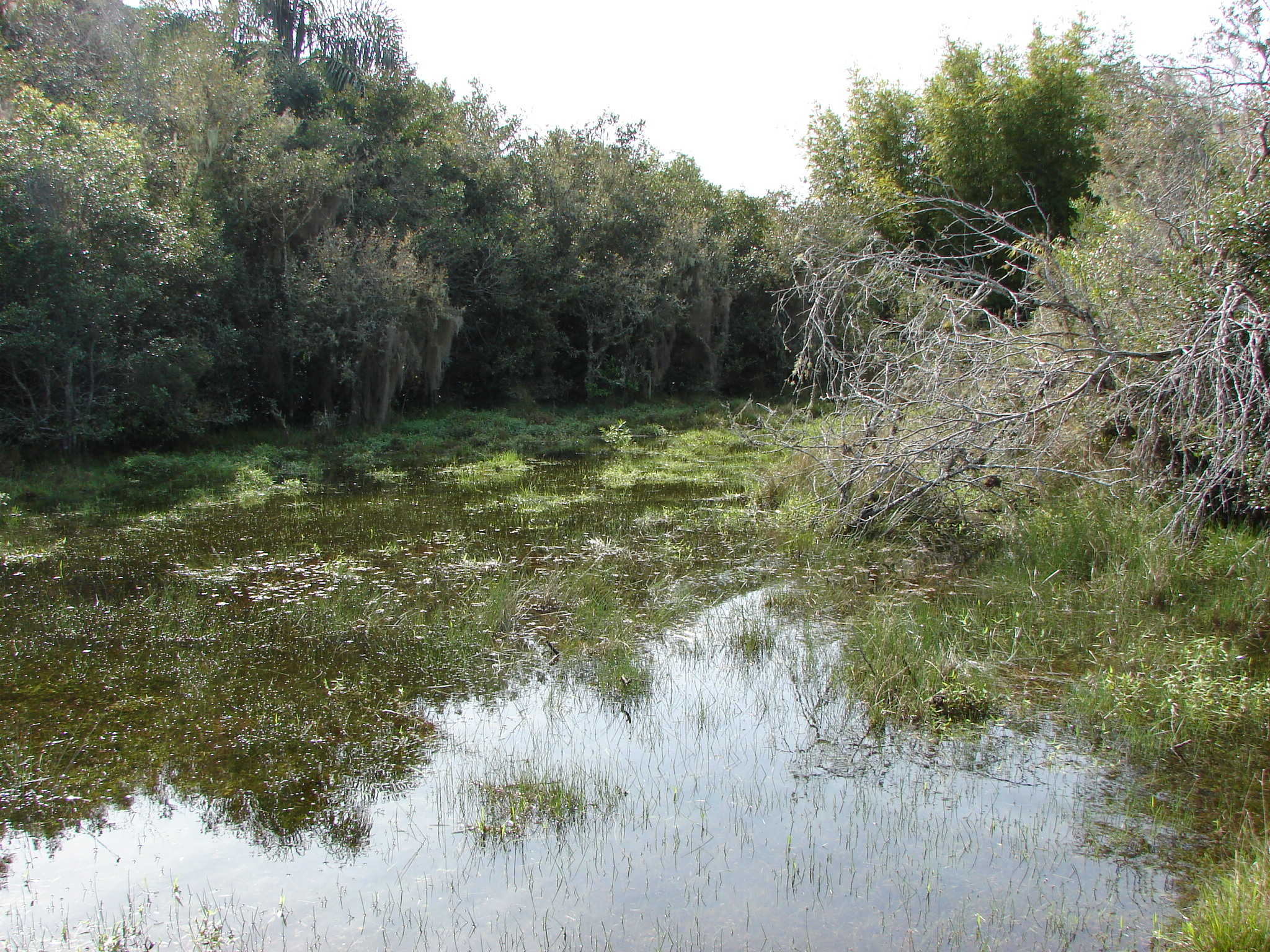
Wetland in the Lami José Lutzenberger Biological Reserve

Lami is home to the Lami José Lutzenberger Biological Reserve, created in 1975 after the discovery in the area of Ephedra tweediana, a rare plant of the restinga woodlands. The reserve covers about 204 hectares; its purposes are nature conservation, scientific research and environmental education.

== Demographics ==
At the 2022 census, Lami had 6,677 inhabitants, of whom 6,567 lived in the urban area and 110 in the rural area. The municipal neighbourhood profile places the bairro in the Extremo Sul region of the city's participatory budget, with an area of 17.495 km^{2} (6.755 sq mi), about 3.7% of the municipality; the average income of its residents is well below the city average.
