= Jerome Lamy =

Austrian scholar (1726–1781)

Jerome Lamy (1726 in Linz – 1781) was an 18th-century Benedictine Biblical scholar and teacher at Salzburg.

== Bibliography ==
- Introductio in Vetus Testamentum (2 vols., Steyr, 1765);
- Introductio in sancta quatuor Evangelia (Venice, 1775);
- Introductio in Acta Apostolorum (Pavia, 1782);
- Fasciculus Myrrhæ, a commentary on the Passion (Steyr, 1766);
- Die sieben Busspsalmen (Salzburg, 1776).
