= Belém Novo =

Coordinates: 30°12′S 51°10′W

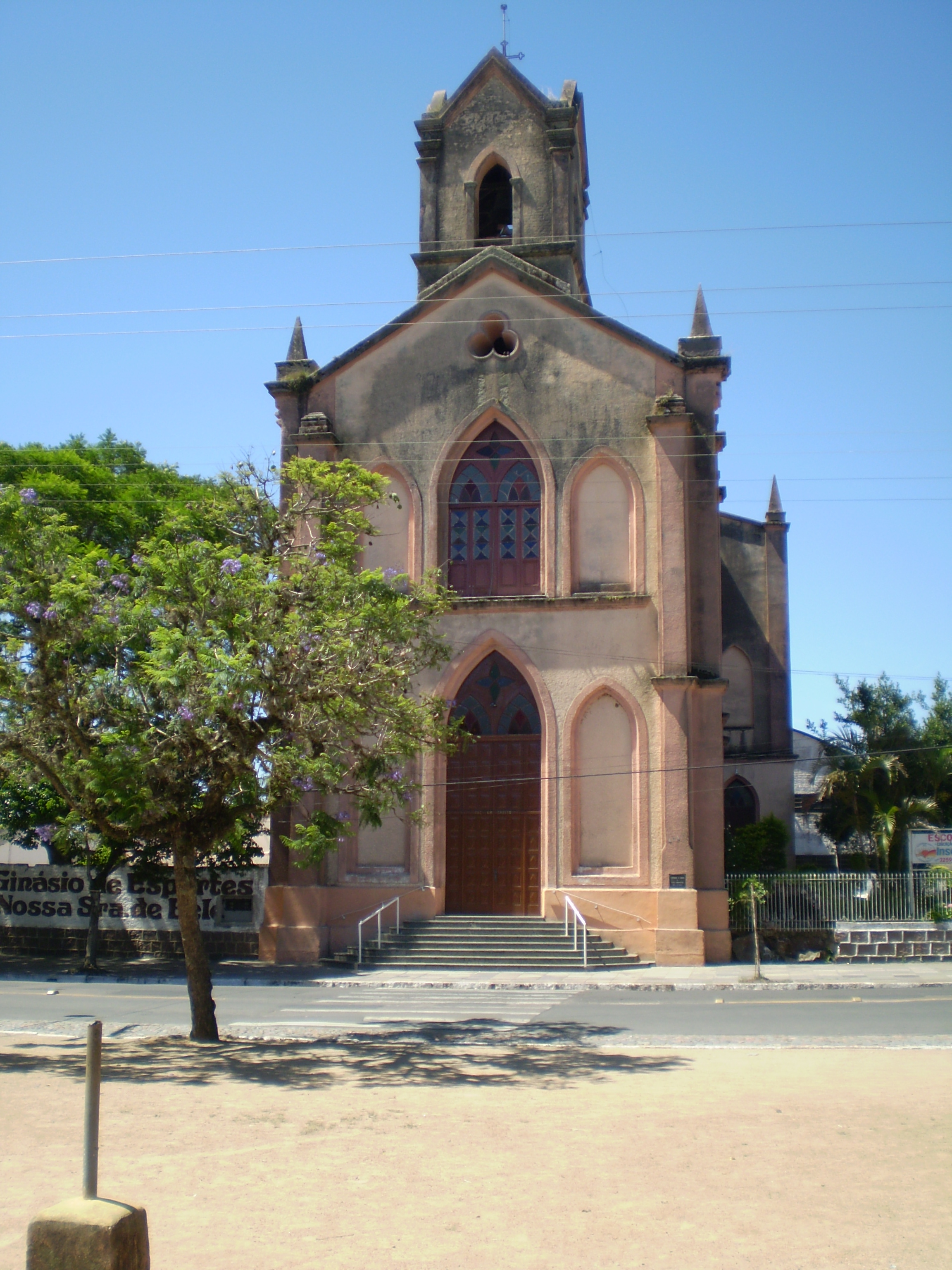
The Igreja de Nossa Senhora de Belém, built between 1876 and 1884.

Belém Novo ('New Bethlehem') is a neighbourhood in the city of Porto Alegre, the state capital of Rio Grande do Sul, Brazil. It was created by Law 6893 from September 12, 1991. Located on the bank of Guaíba Lake, Belém Novo is considered part of the rural zone of the city.
