= Stanislas Lami =

French sculptor and art historian

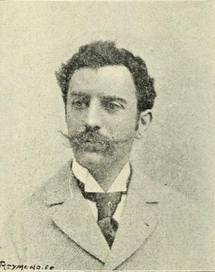
- Born: 30 November 1858; Paris, France
- Died: 31 January 1944 (aged 85); Paris, France
- Occupations: Sculptor, art historian
- Parent: Alphonse Lami (father)
- Family: Charles Sedelmeyer ((father-in-law)

Stanislas Lami (30 November 1858 – 31 January 1944) was a French sculptor, publisher and art historian.

== Biography ==
=== Early life ===
Lami was born in Paris, France the son of Marie Bidauld and Italian-French sculptor and egyptologist Alphonse Lami. On 24 June 1891 he married Émilie Sedelmeyer, the daughter of Austrian and French art dealer and editor Charles Sedelmeyer

=== Art works and publications ===
Some of his works are on show in museums in Spain. The musée d'Orsay has his marble sculpture of a Chien danois (c.1892) – he also produced a Death-Mask of Berlioz (1884) now held at the bibliothèque de l'Opéra de Paris. He gave one of his works to his relation Charles de Gaulle. Stanislas Lami exhibited frequently at the Paris Salons, including that of 1897, and at the Chicago salon of 1893. In the end his descendants held onto the majority of his works. He died in Paris in January, 1944, aged 85.

Stanislas Lami also published an important dictionary of French sculptors, which is still the largest ever dictionary of sculptors.

- Dictionnaire des sculpteurs de l'antiquité au VIe siècle de notre ère (Paris, 1884, 149 P.)
- Dictionnaire des sculpteurs de l'École française du Moyen Âge au règne de Louis XIV (Paris, 1898, 584 p.)
- Dictionnaire des sculpteurs de l'École française sous le règne de Louis XIV (Paris, 1906, 508 p.)
- Dictionnaire des sculpteurs de l'École française au XVIIIe siècle (Paris, 1910–1911, 2 vol.)
- Dictionnaire des sculpteurs de l'École française au XIXe siècle (Paris, 1914–1921, 4 vol.)
