= Guido da Verona =

Italian writer

Guido da Verona (the pseudonym of Guido Verona; 7 May 1881 – 5 April 1939) was an Italian poet and novelist.

Born in Saliceto Panaro to a Jewish family, Verona started his career as a poet in 1901 with the poetry collection Commemorazione del fatto d'arme di Brichetto, followed by I frammenti d'un poema (1902) and Bianco amore (1907).

He gained a larger popularity as a novelist, starting from 1911 when he published his first novel Colei che non si deve amare, considered among the most representative examples of the Italian Feuilleton. He later was the most commercially successful Italian writer between 1914 and 1939: particularly his novel Mimì Bluette, fiore del mio giardino, which reached 300,000 copies in 1922, an impressive run in Italy where illiteracy characterized the majority of the population.

He was a signatory to the Manifesto of Fascist intellectuals in 1925; in 1929 he published a parody novel of Alessandro Manzoni's The Betrothed, that actually was an implicit satire against fascism.

He became an intellectual unpopular with the Fascist regime and marginalized as a Jew after the approval of Italian racial laws. Da Verona committed suicide in Milan at age 57.
