= Equestrian statue of Napoleon =

Statue of Napoleon in Rouen, France

Coordinates: 49.4434°N 1.0989°E

Monument to Napoleon I
- Monument à Napoléon Ier
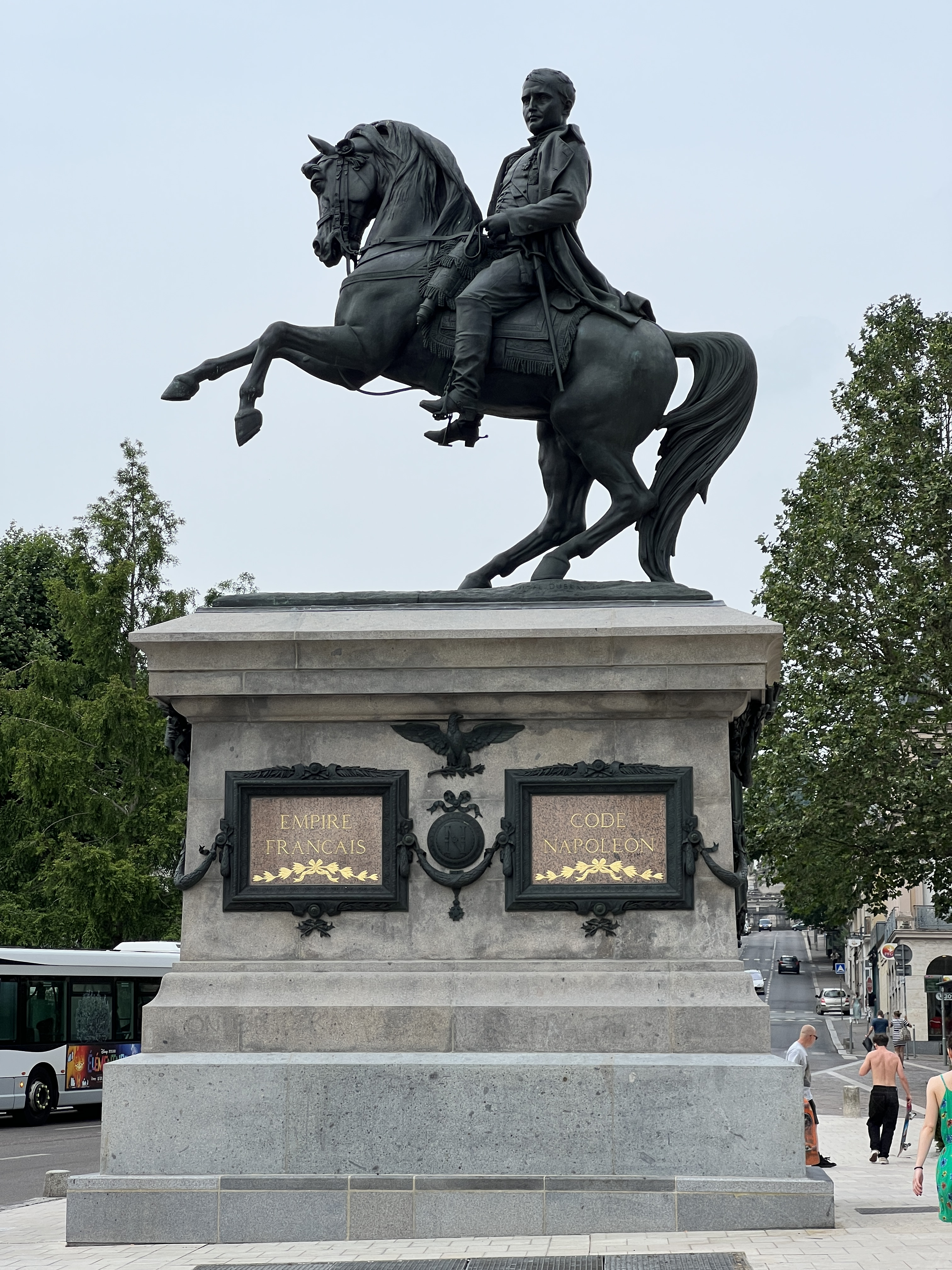
- Location: Place du Général-de-Gaulle; Rouen, Normandy, France
- Designer: Gabriel-Vital Dubray
- Type: Equestrian statue
- Material: Bronze
- Completion date: 1865
- Dedicated to: Napoleon

The equestrian statue of Napoleon is a monument located at Place du Général-de-Gaulle in the French city of Rouen in Normandy. The equestrian statue depicts Napoleon on horseback and was erected in 1865. It was sculpted in bronze by Gabriel-Vital Dubray, and its pedestal was designed by Louis Desmarest. It stands in front of the Hôtel de Ville in Rouen.

In 1881, during the Third French Republic, the city's administration saw the statue of the emperor as contrary to their values. There were plans to melt it into a new statue of an effigy of the republic, or to remove the man and leave only the horse; these plans did not come to fruition due to lack of funds.

In June 2020, the statue was taken down for repairs. Fractures in the hoof of the horse meant that it could have fallen down. A treasure chest of bronze, silver and gold coins of Napoleon III – nephew of Napoleon I and the reigning emperor at the time of inauguration – was found inside the pedestal.

In September 2021, Socialist mayor Nicolas Mayer-Rossignol wished to replace it with a statue or work of art dedicated to the recently deceased feminist Gisèle Halimi. This plan was strongly opposed by the leader of the city's opposition, Jean-François Bures. Historian Thierry Lentz, director of the Fondation Napoléon, called the plan "cancel culture" and argued that Napoleon was a benefactor of Rouen, making him more locally relevant than Halimi.

In December 2021, a survey of 4,080 residents found that 68% wanted the statue to remain, and the city council said it would respect the result. Later in December 2021, the statue was registered as a monument historique.
