= Francisque Joseph Duret =

French sculptor

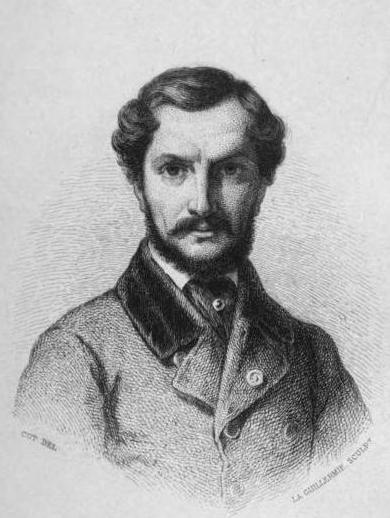
Francisque Duret; portrait by Pierre Auguste Cot; engraved by Auguste Laguillermie

Francisque Joseph Duret (French pronunciation: [fʁɑ̃sisk ʒozɛf dyʁɛ]; 19 October 1804 – 26 May 1865) was a French sculptor, son and pupil of François-Joseph Duret (1732–1816).

== Life and career ==
Before becoming a sculptor, Francisque Duret had shown interest in pursuing a career in theater. He studied for a brief time at the Conservatoire and his friend Charles Blanc (1813-1882), in an article which he dedicated in 1866, attested to the quality of observing human behavior which Duret had acquired outside his studies of drama: "His continual studies of the pantomime led him to pin down the language of gesture and the meaning of each disposition". Finally, it was the work of the sculptor which he decided to pursue.

After his tutelage under his father, who passed when Duret was but twelve years old, he also studied under Bosio, and won the Prix de Rome in 1823, which he shared with Augustin Dumont for the bas-relief Evandre sur le corps de son fils Pallas. He remained in Italy until 1828. Upon his return to Paris, he received numerous official commissions which assured him of his prestige alongside his work as professor at l'Ecole des Beaux-Arts, where he had among his students Jean-Baptiste Carpeaux, Jules Dalou as well as Louis-Léon Cugnot.

In 1833 he exhibited his Neapolitan Fisher Dancing the Tarantella, now in the Louvre, a spirited statue in bronze, which established his reputation. In the same class is his Neapolitan Improvisatore (1839, Leipzig Museum). His works executed for public buildings include: France Protecting her Children (1855), a group in the grand style for the Louvre; two bronze atlantes at Napoleon's tomb in the Invalides; a colossal Christ in the church of the Madeleine; the statues of Comedy and Tragedy for the Théâtre Français; marble statues of Dunois, Philippe of France, Chateaubriand, and Richelieu at Versailles; and the group for the Fontaine Saint-Michel, representing that saint wrestling with Satan.

One of his works, Grape-picker Extemporizing, made in 1839, shows a man playing a mandolin. The sculpture shows the instrument in the period when its popularity had declined outside of Italy. The instrument had left the concert halls, becoming a folk instrument.

He received the medal of honor in 1855, was an Officer in the Legion of Honor, and was made a member of the Institut de France in 1845.

== Selected works ==
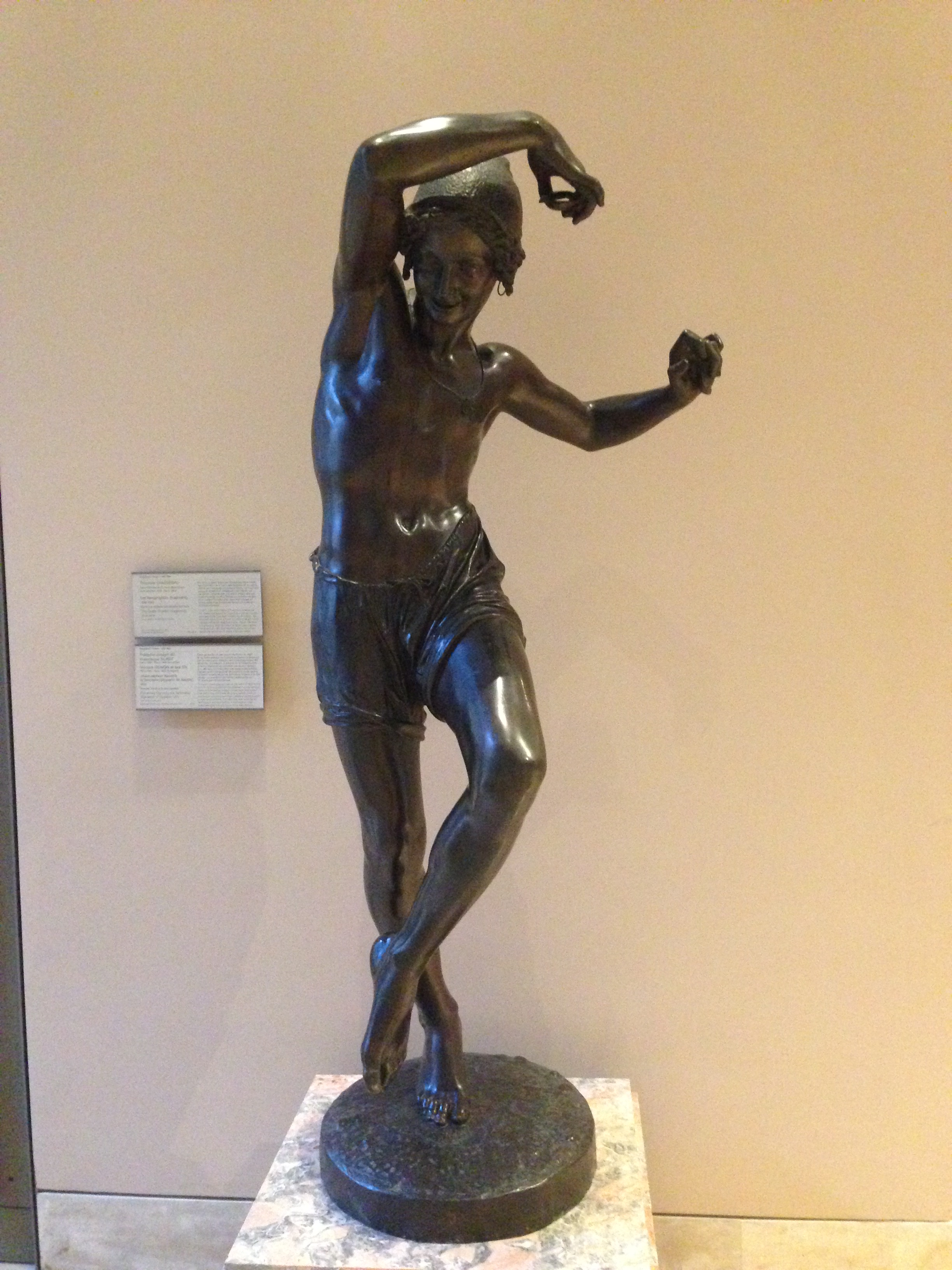
Neapolitan Fisher Dancing the Tarantella, 1833

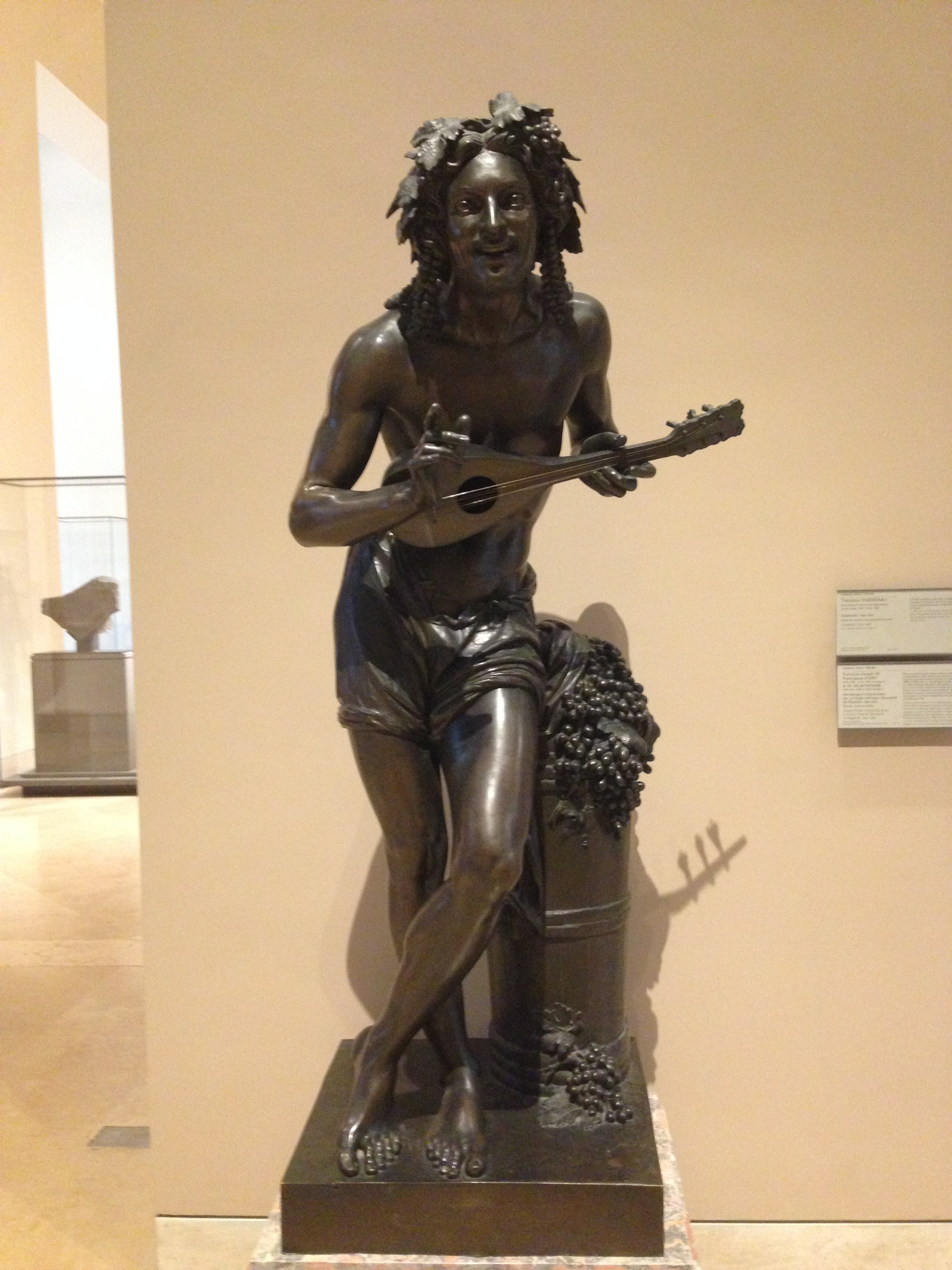
Grape-picker Extemporizing,1839

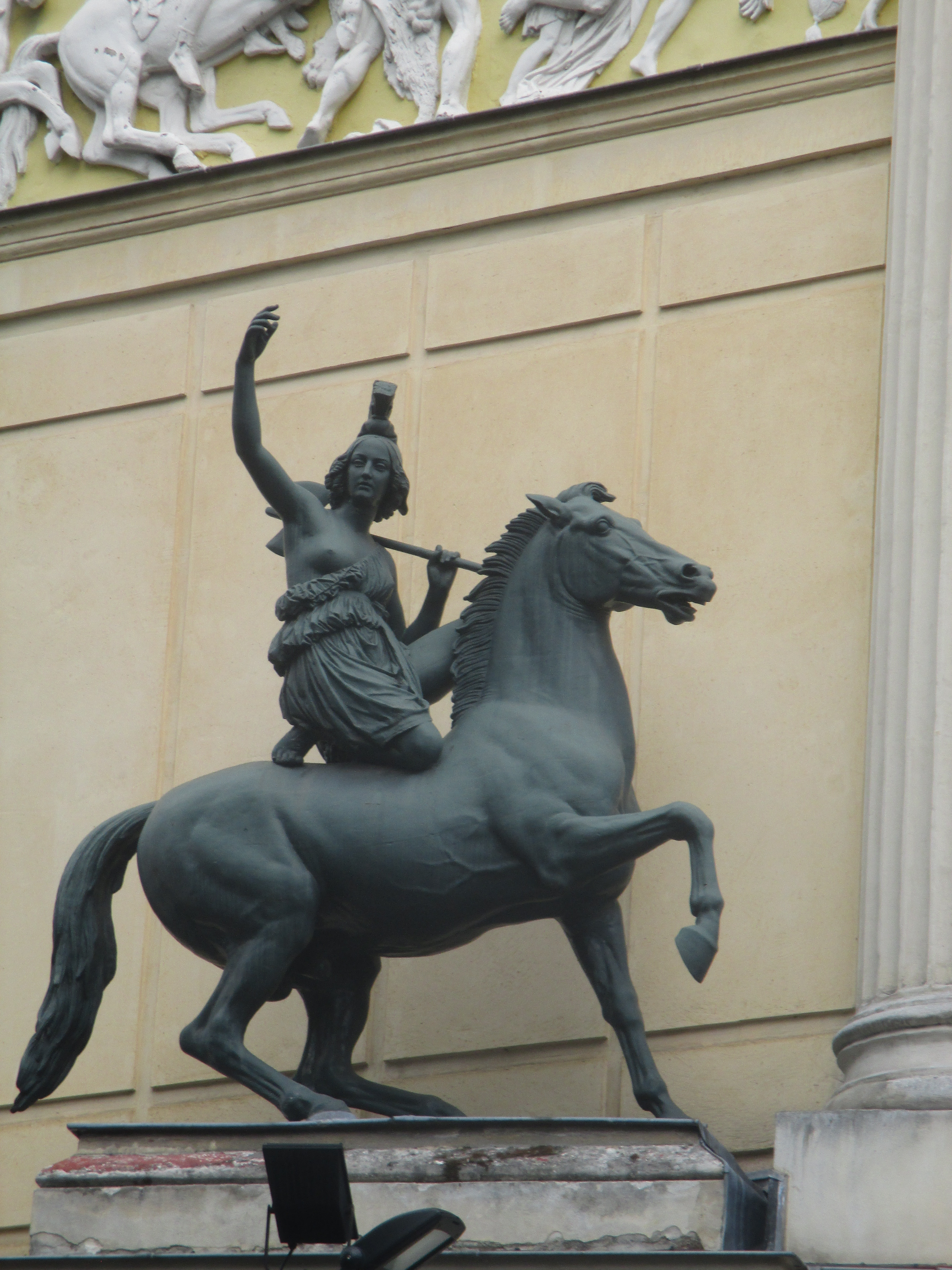
Cirque d'hiver Paris

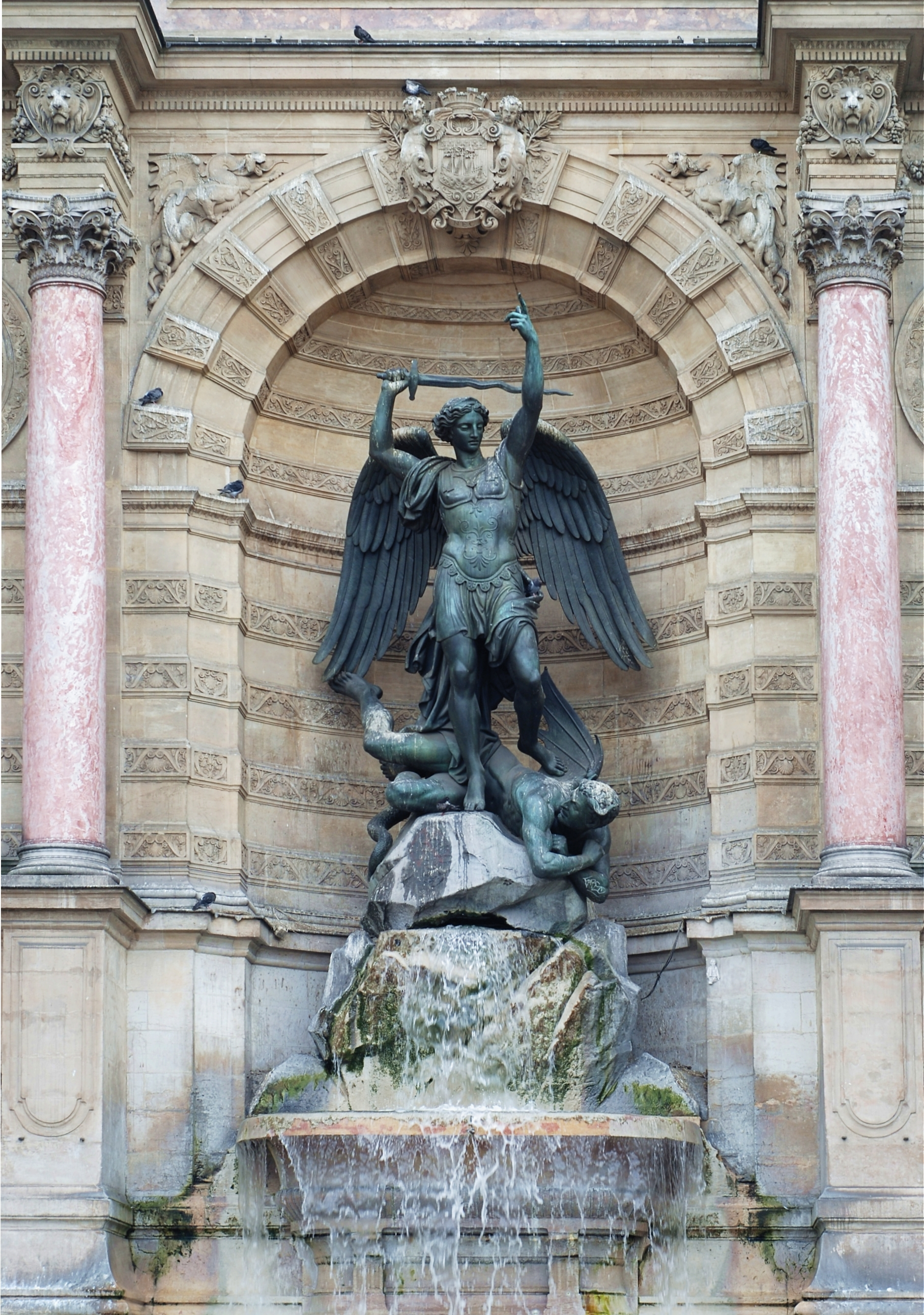
Fontaine Saint-Michel, Paris

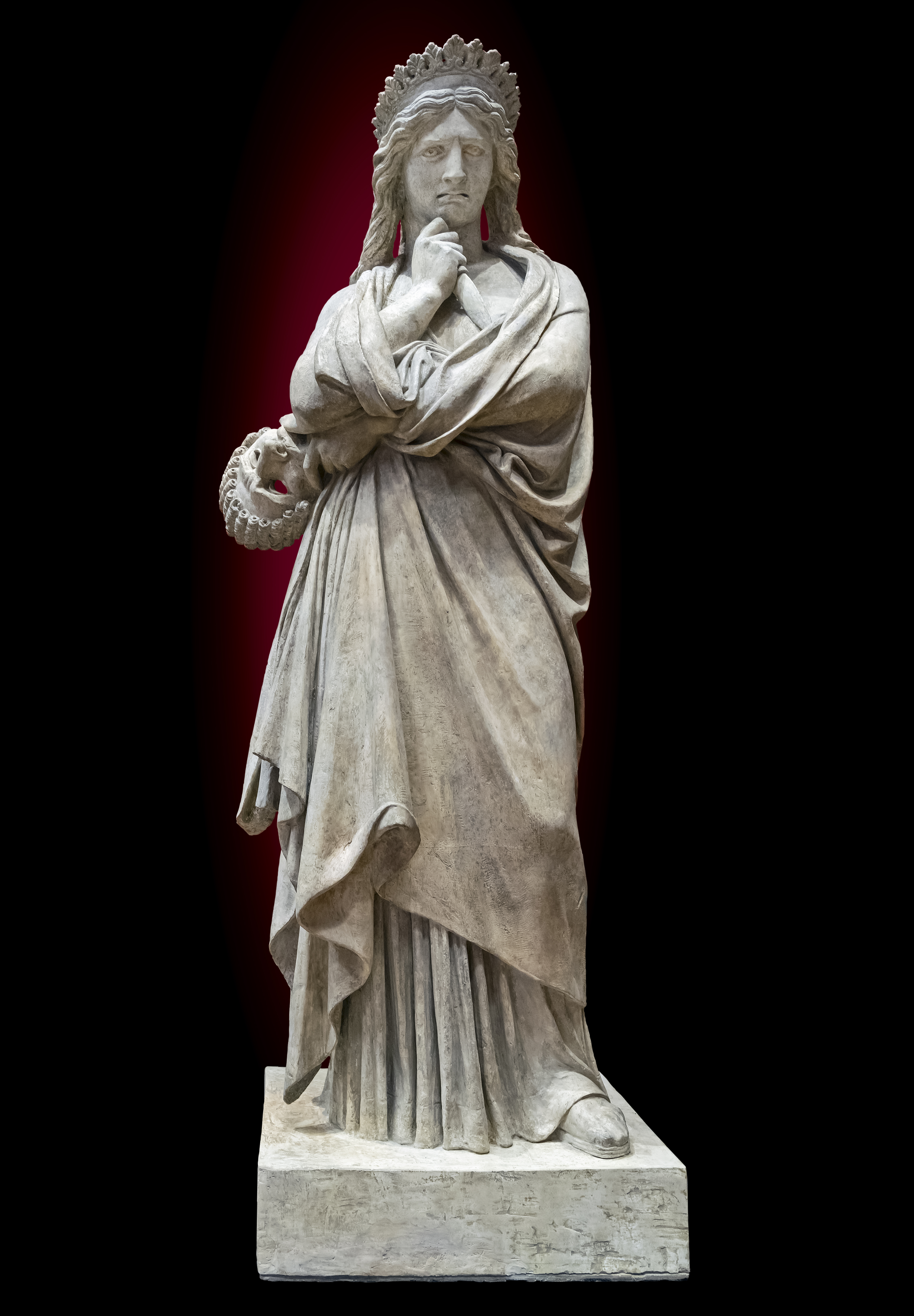
The tragedy (musée des Augustins, Toulouse), c. 1851-1875
