= Café Frascati =

Former cafe in Paris, France

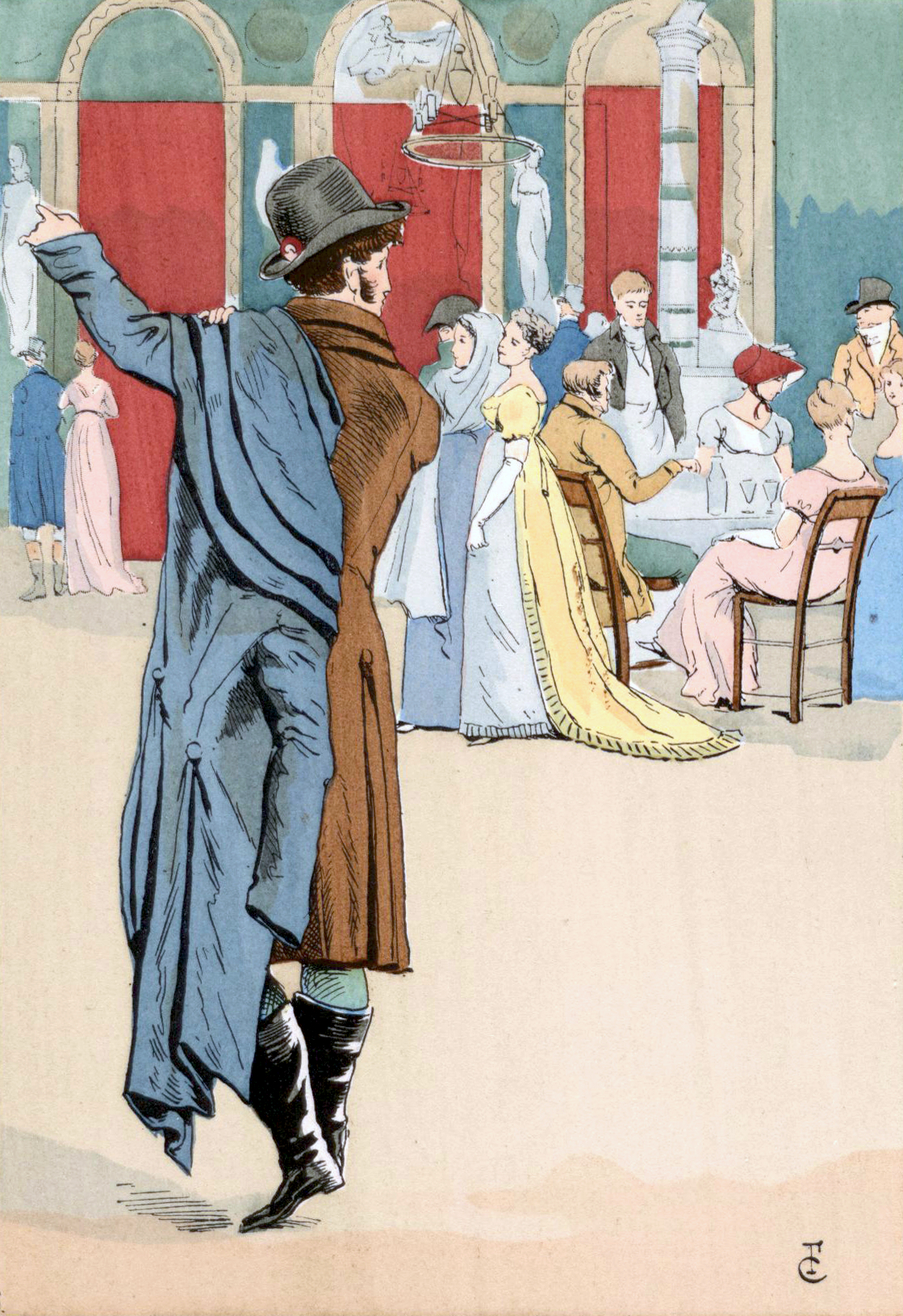
The Café Frascati, in 1800.

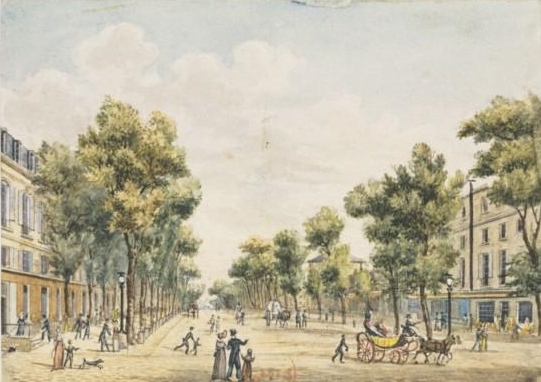
The Boulevard Montmartre and the Café Frascati, in 1822, by Christophe Civeton.

Le Café Frascati was a Parisian café founded in 1789. It became defunct in 1857.

== History ==
The café was founded in 1789 on the corner of the Boulevard Montmartre and the Rue de Richelieu under the name of Jardins de Frascati. It was purchased in 1792 by a Neapolitan gelatiere named Garchi, who changed the name to the Café Frascati.

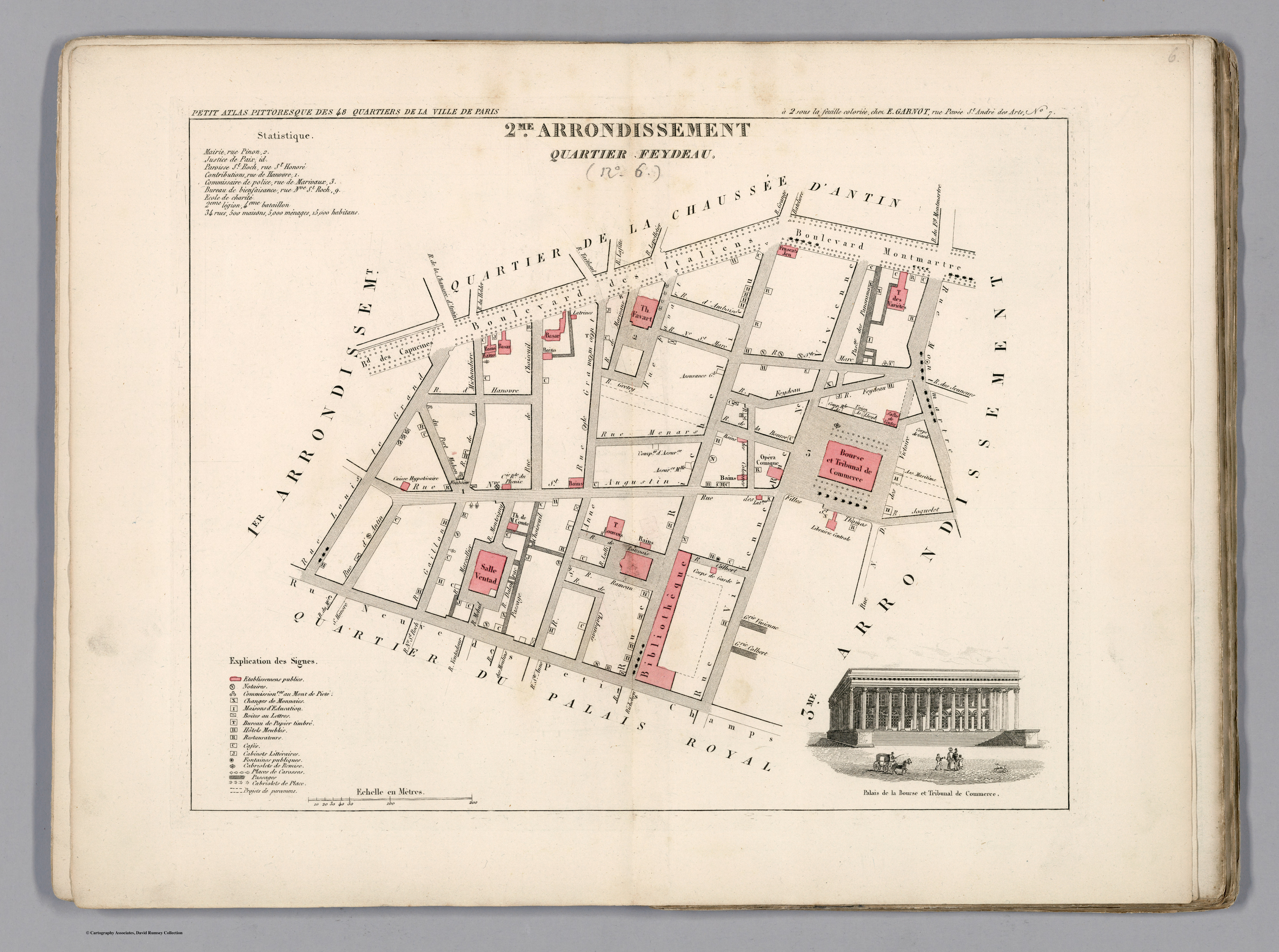
Plan of the quartier Feydeau in the former 2nd arrondissement in 1834.

Frequented primarily by men and woman of light morals, the establishment was at once a gambling hall, a restaurant and a patisserie renowned for its ices. It was a pleasant place, also possessing a garden.

Several proprietors followed Garchi. In 1846, the Café Frascati was acquired by Borel, the proprietor of the Rocher de Cancale; the café was demolished the next year.

== Description ==
An English traveler describes the premises in 1802: "The entry hall resembled that of the house of some great lord; the ground floor was divided in elegant salons, splendidly lit and adorned with mirrors. These salons opened onto a garden filled with illuminated orange trees and acacias, with grottos, temples, and fairy alleyways; the joyful effect of the colored lamps, along with the general vivacity make one think of the stories of the Thousand and One Nights."

Around the same time, another Englishman wrote:

A stairway leads to a lovely vestibule, and from there to a hall surrounded with mirrors and decorated with festoons of artificial flowers. At the far end is a beautiful statue of the Medici Venus. Near that statue an arcade opens, giving access to a suite of six magnificent rooms, superbly gilded and also decorated with mirrors and with chandeliers of diamond-shaped crystals, which shine like so many sparking waterfalls. The rooms where one takes coffee or ices are like beacons of light. One moves from one room to the other through arcades or through double doors adorned with mirrors. The garden, small but skillfully arranged, is composed of three alleys flanked with oranges, acacias and pots of roses; at the far end rises a tower constructed on a rock, along with temples and rustic bridges; on each side are little labyrinths. A terrace extends the length of the boulevard, and looks out over it; it is edged in front with lovely vases of flowers and on either side by sorts of alleys decorated with mirrors. There, in the course of an hour, a stranger, the stranger, split between surprise and admiration, can see close to three thousand of the most beautiful and most distinguished women of Paris, whose cheeks are no longer disfigured with rouge, and who, from the harmony and grace of their appearance, would lead one to believe that the most beautiful women of Greece, in this most brilliant of epochs, live and move before his eyes.

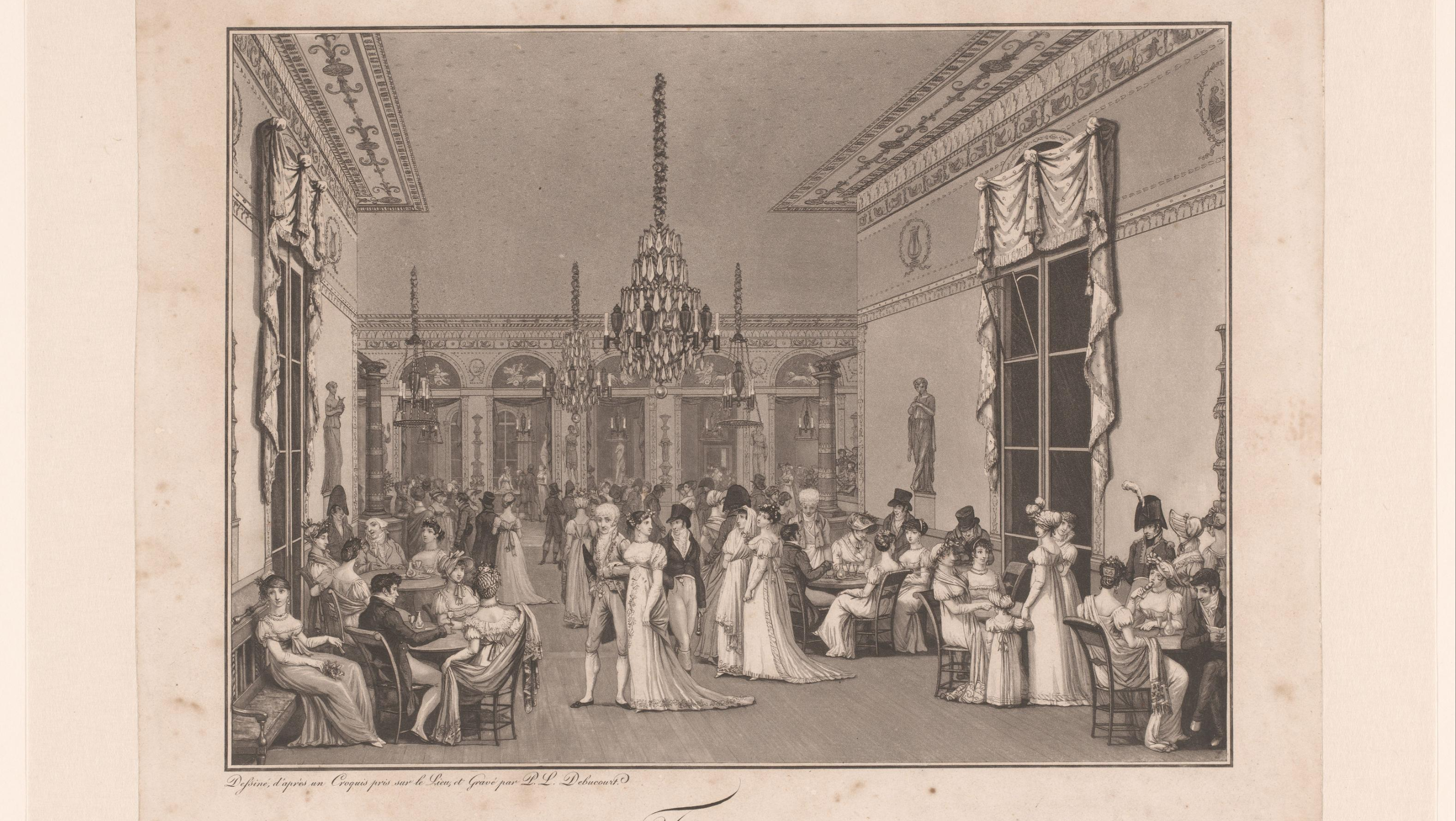
The Café Frascati, 1807, aquatint by Philibert-Louis Debucourt

== In literature ==
The Café Frascati is chiefly remembered thanks to the literature of the 19th century, where it is very often mentioned.

Alexandre Dumas describes it in Georges: it is there that the rich mulatto comes to bet wildly, dazzle the Parisian elite, and brave their racism.

In Balzac's La Comédie humaine, the Café Frascati is mentioned 12 times, and the Café Frascati in Rome two times, in Sarrasine. In La Fausse Maîtresse, it is depicted as a place where one goes to see and be seen; in Illusions perdues, it is a hell of gaming and debauchery, but also a place of high gastronomic repute where the lorette Florine comes to order dishes for her great dinners. It is also mentioned in La Fille aux yeux d'or, Les Employés ou la Femme supérieure, Splendeurs et misères des courtisanes.

== La religieuse ==
According to Gaëlle Jan, writing on the website plurielle.fr, it was the Café Frascati that in 1856 created the religieuse, a chocolate or coffee pastry still baked today.

== Bibliography ==
- Luc Bihl-Willette, Des tavernes aux bistrots. Une histoire des cafés, Paris, L'Âge d'Homme, 1997 ISBN 9782825107737.
- André Castelot, L'Histoire à table, Paris, Plon-Perrin, 1972, p. 297, 319, 473, 558, 654.
- Hillairet, Jacques (1963). Dictionnaire historique des rues de Paris. Paris: Les Éditions de Minuit. ; réédition 1985 ISBN 9782707310545.
- Rabier, Soirées de Frascati, ou Mémoires de feu le Cher de Saint-Fulchrand, Paris, Constant-Chantpie, 1828, Texte en ligne.
- René Héron de Villefosse, Histoire et géographie gourmandes de Paris, Éditions de Paris, 1956, p. 56, 57, 61, 70, 80, 83.
