= Alfred de Dreux =

French painter (1810–1860)

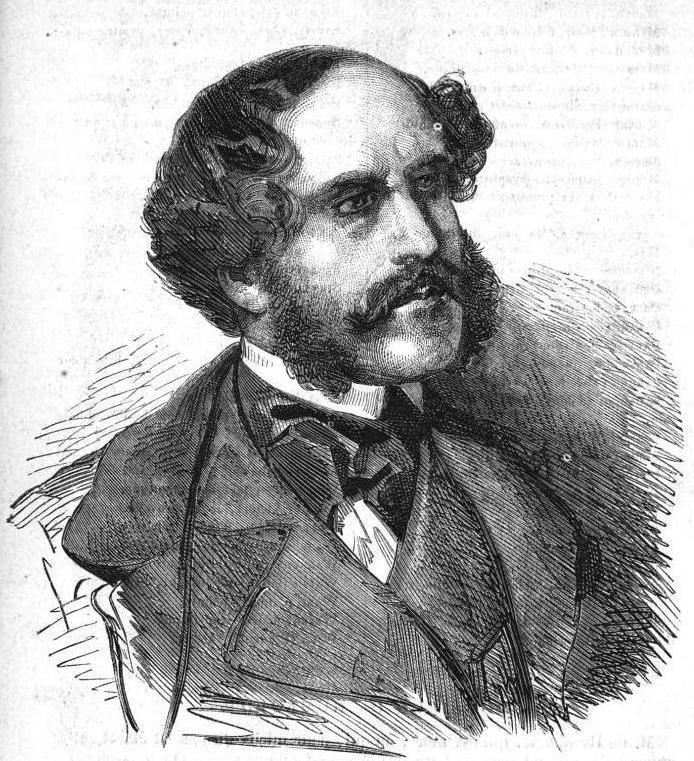
- Alfred de Dreux from the Almanach de la littérature, du théâtre et des beaux-arts (1860)
- Born: Pierre-Alfred Dedreux; 23 March 1810; Paris, France
- Died: 5 March 1860 (aged 49); Paris, France
- Education: Théodore Géricault and Léon Cogniet

Pierre-Alfred Dedreux, who signed his works as Alfred de Dreux (French pronunciation: [alfʁɛd də dʁø]; 23 March 1810, in Paris – 5 March 1860, in Paris) was a French portrait and animal painter, best known for his scenes with horses.

== Biography ==
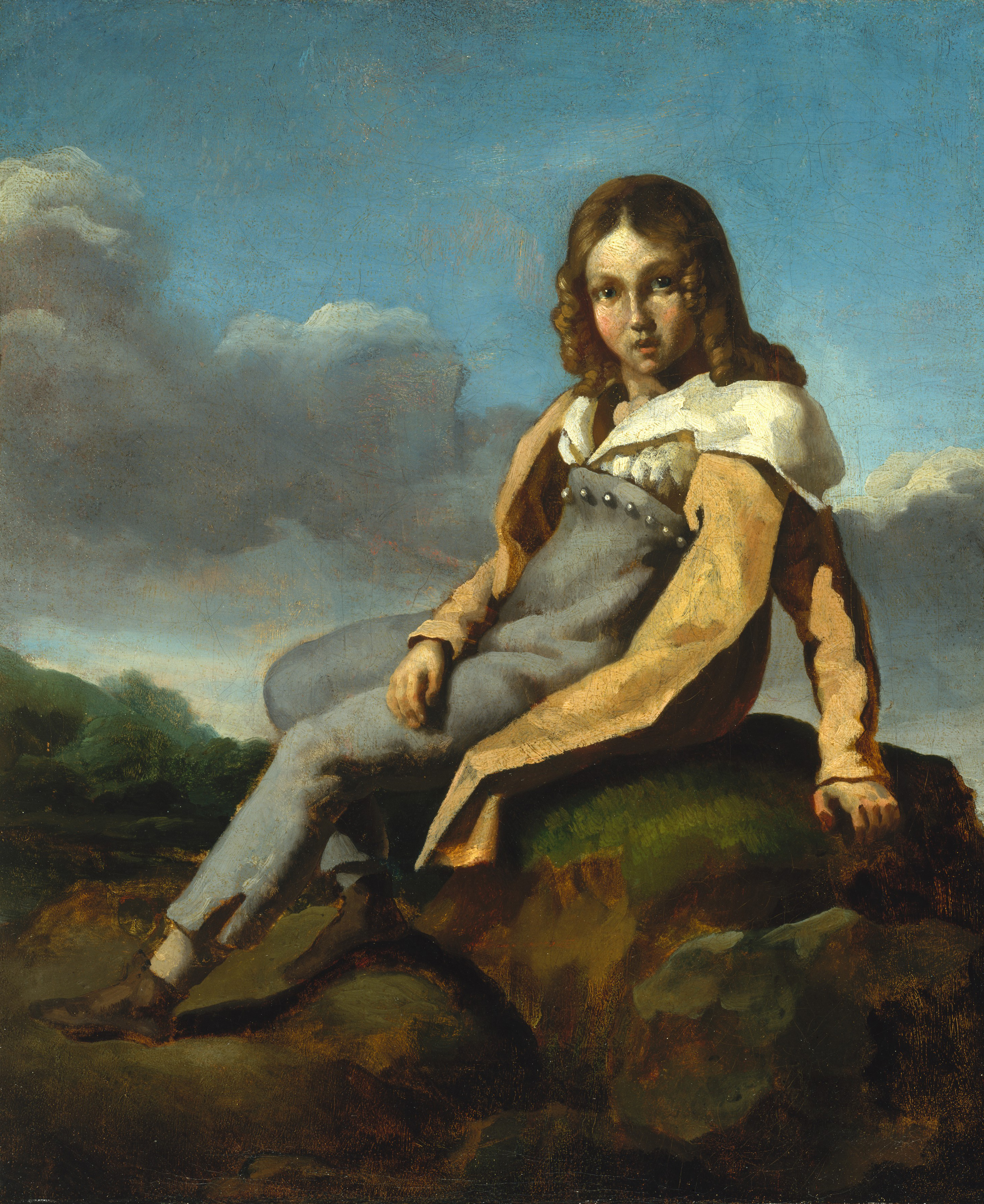
Portrait of Alfred de Dreux as a boy of about 10, by Théodore Géricault

Alfred de Dreux was born in 1810 into a privileged and colourful family. He was the first child and only son of the architect, Pierre-Anne Dedreux (1788-1834). His sister, Élise (1812-1846) was the mother of writer Louis Becq de Fouquières. After his father won the Prix de Rome for architecture in 1815, he lived at the Villa Médicis in Rome. While there, Théodore Géricault, a friend of the family, made portraits of him (pictured) and Élise.

In 1823, at the urging of his uncle, the painter Pierre-Joseph Dedreux-Dorcy, he began studying art with Géricault who was a family friend and a lover of horses. Later, he studied at the studio of Léon Cogniet. By this time, horses had become his favorite subject. His first exhibition at the Salon came in 1831 with the painting Interieur del Salon, which won him immediate fame. The following year, an equestrian portrait of the Duc d'Orléans became his entry to a position in the workshops of Eugène Isabey.

From 1840, he began the now famous series of portraits of horses from the stables of the Duc d'Orléans. The Scènes Equestres was completed in 1842 and the Petits Scènes Equestres in 1847. Dreux made a second portrait of the Duc together with his guards. King Louis-Philippe was so pleased with it that he invited Dreux to accompany him on an official trip to England. Following the revolution of 1848, the French royal family emigrated to England, where Dreux became a frequent visitor. He made many return trips there over the next few years, where the English passion for horses and fox-hunting earned him many commissions from the English aristocracy.

He returned to Paris in 1852 and opened a studio where he created more equestrian portraits, this time of Emperor Napoléon III and his family, but still made frequent trips to England. In 1857, he began sharing a studio with Paul Gavarni, who he met while there. He died from an abscess in his liver that had developed during a stay in England, as evidenced by letters to his family, although a rumor was later circulated that he died in a duel with Count Fleury, Napoleon's aide-de-camp. This rumor is sometimes attributed to Charles Blanc. In 1951, it was repeated in a memoir by Dreux's grandnephew, the writer André de Fouquières.

The logo of Hermès International is based on a drawing by Dreux.

== Selected paintings ==
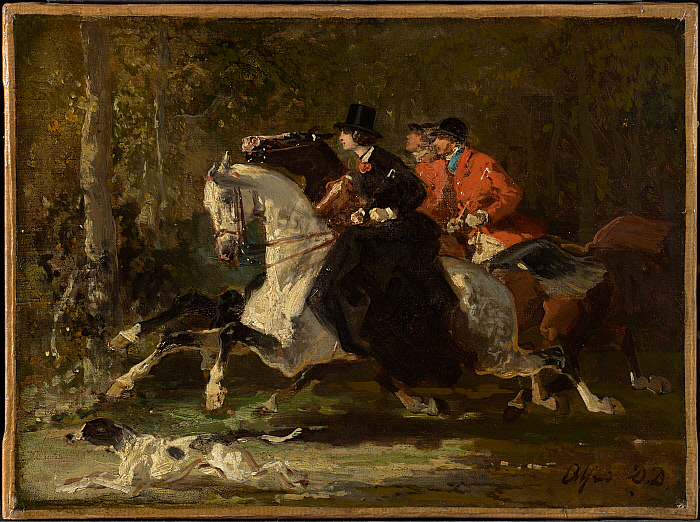
Equestrians (1840–55), oil on canvas, 9 1/2 x 12 3/4 in. (24.1 x 32.4 cm), Clark Art Institute

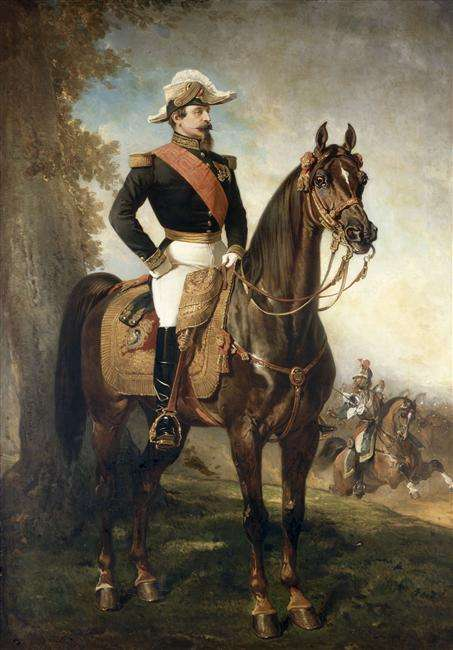
Equestrian portrait
of Napoleon III

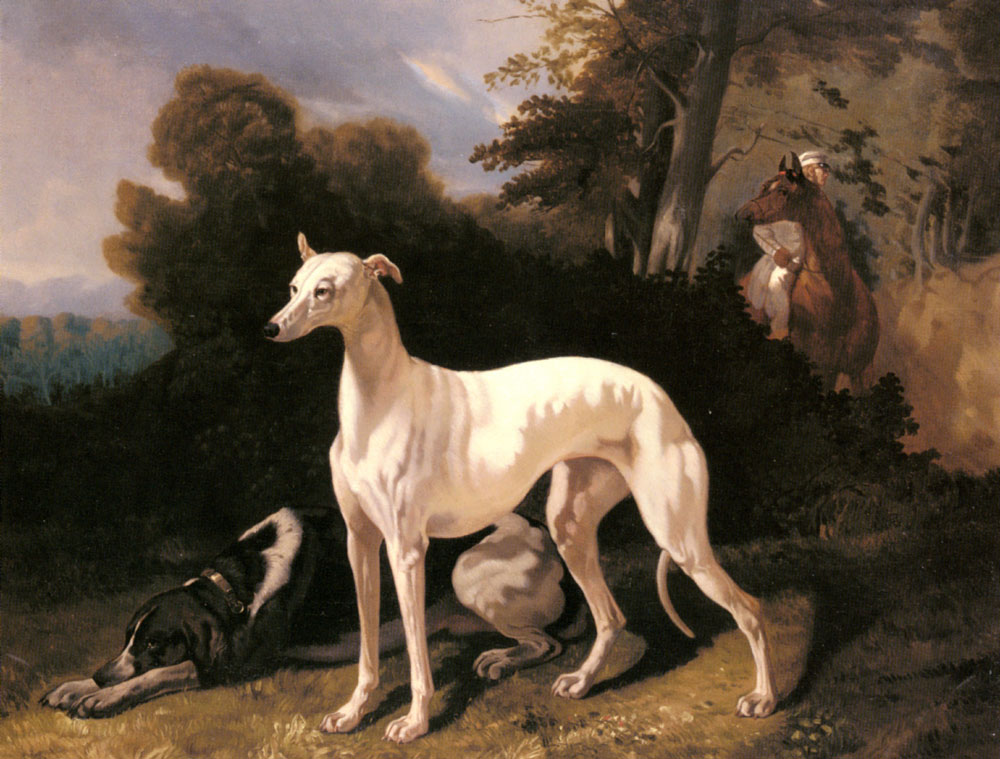
Greyhound and Spaniel

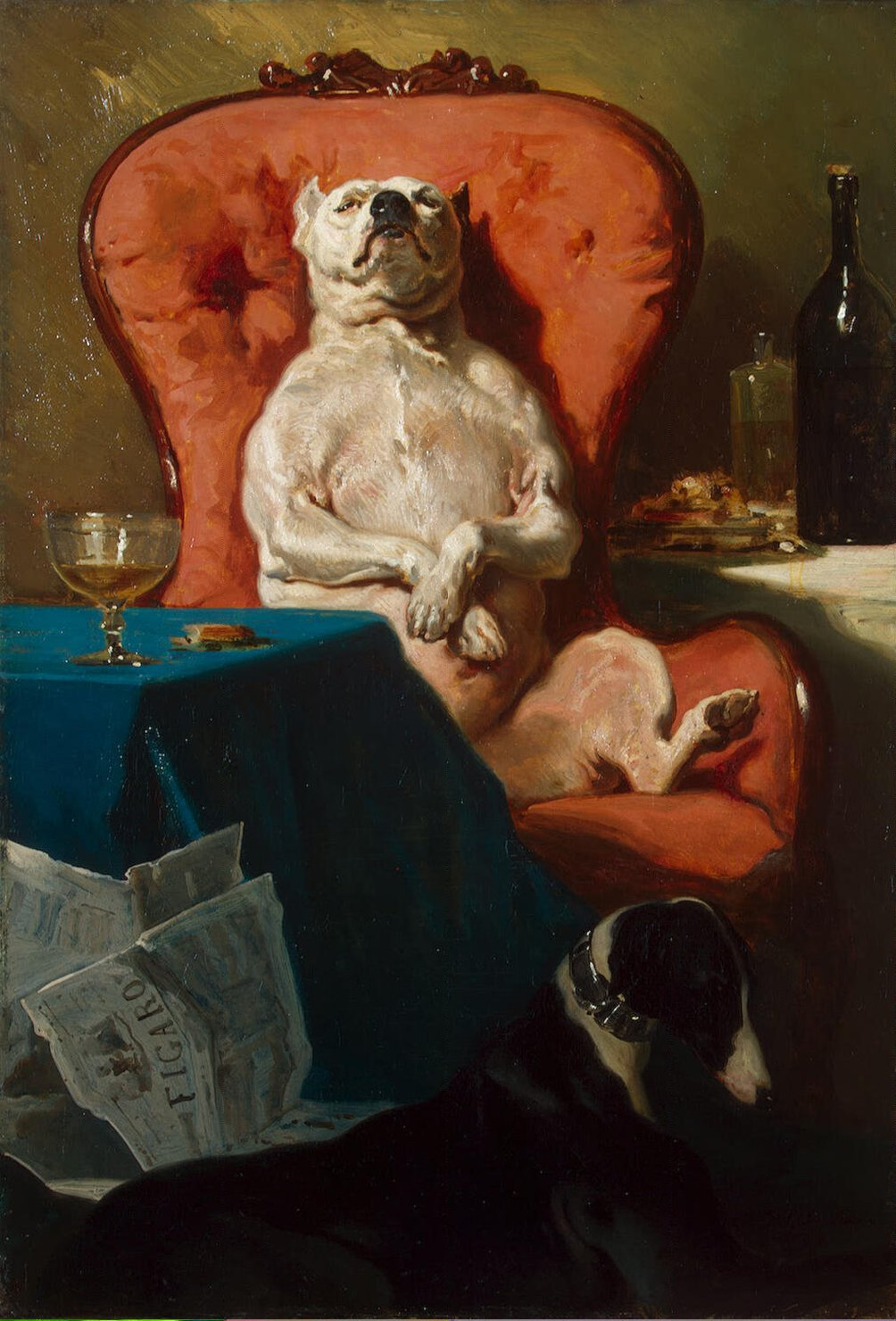
Pug Dog in an Armchair, now at the Hermitage Museum

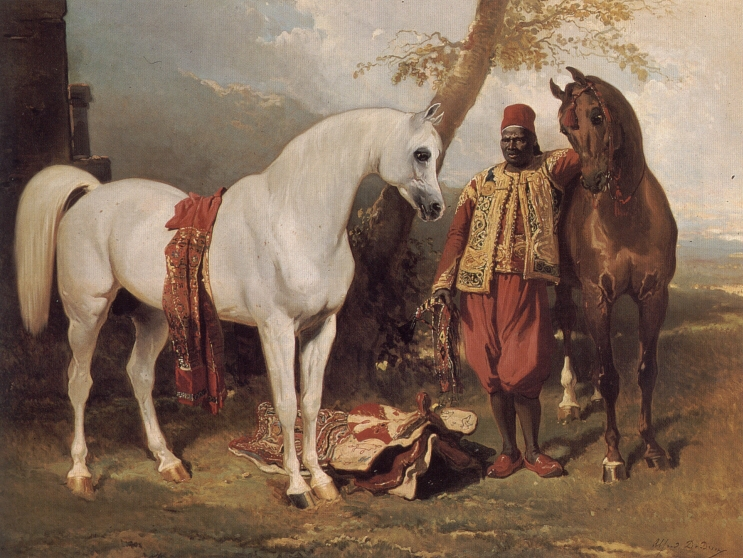
The Mounts of
Abd El Kader

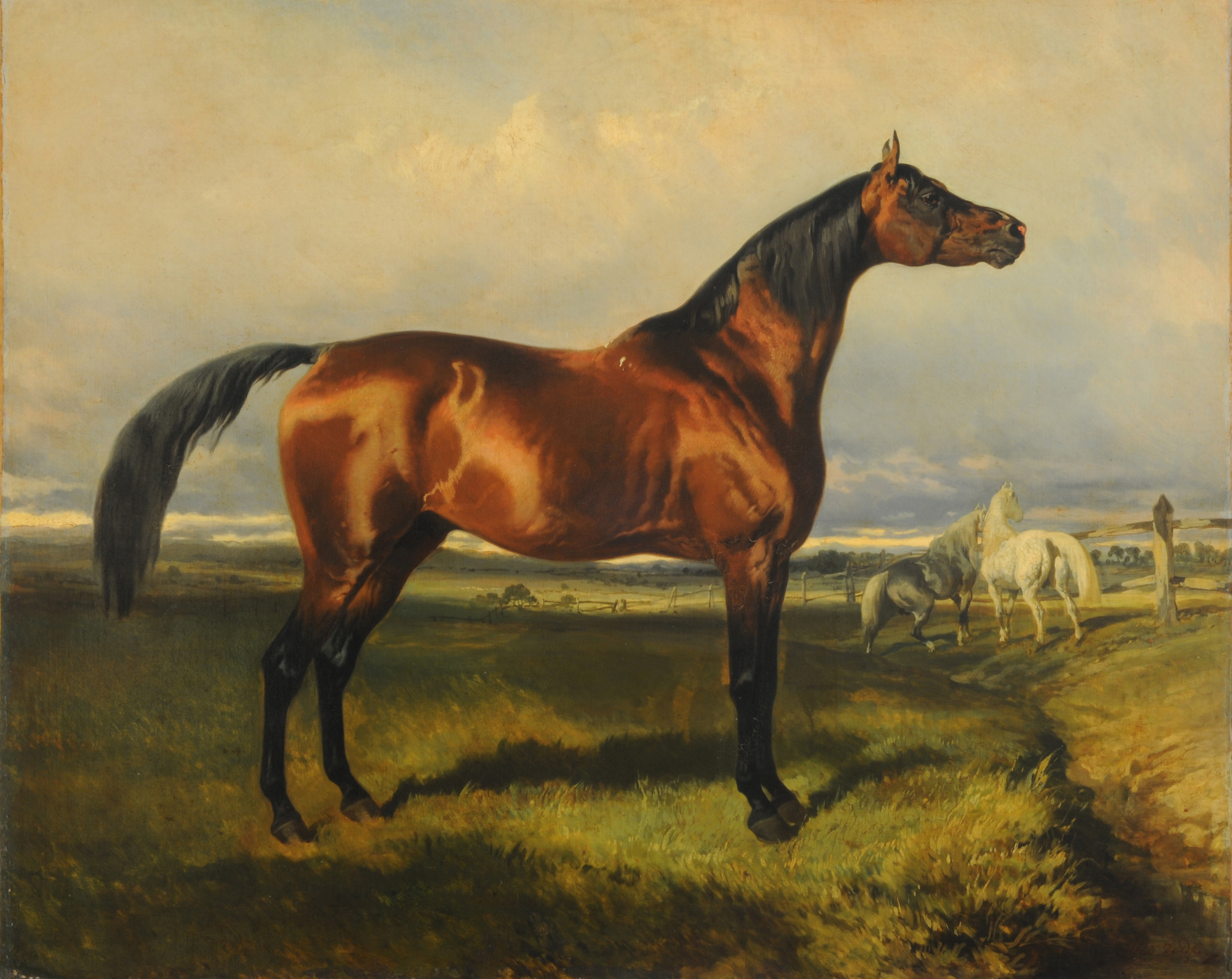
Wild horses
