= Scottish Horseman =

Painting by Gustave Moureau

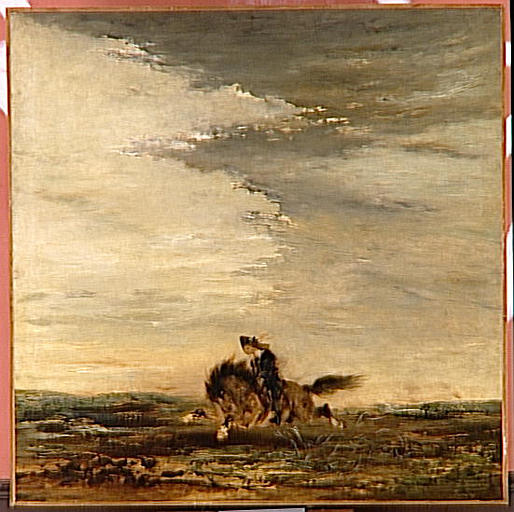
- Artist: Gustave Moreau
- Year: c. 1870
- Medium: oil on canvas
- Dimensions: 145 cm × 145 cm (57 in × 57 in)
- Location: Musée Gustave Moreau; Paris (France)

Scottish Horseman, Pony or Horseman is an 1870s oil on canvas painting by Gustave Moreau, enlarging an earlier painting also entitled Horseman - both works are now in the Musée Gustave Moreau.

The artist's last Romantic work, it was strongly inspired by Eugène Delacroix (especially his Tam O'Shanter and the importance it assigns to the sky, a painting inspired by Robert Burns' ballad Tam O'Shanter). Moreau knew Delacroix and went to his studio after setbacks at the Paris Salons - Tam O'Shanter was still there in 1849 and it may have been there where Moreau saw it. Moreau also painted Galloping Pony (1865-1880), a wax sculpture which he may have used as a model for this painting.

== Context ==
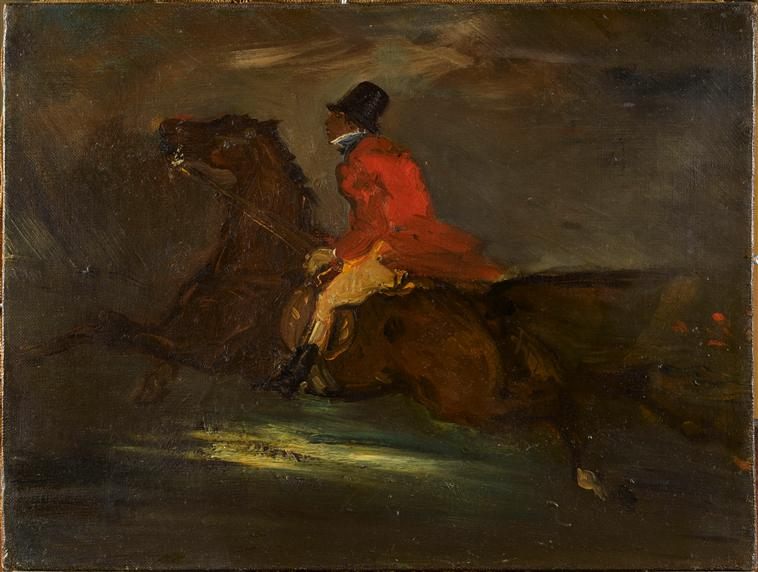
Gustave Moreau, Horseman, 1854, Paris, Musée Gustave Moreau.

Moreau often painted and drew horses during his Romantic period and was probably encouraged to do so by Pierre-Joseph Dedreux-Dorcy, whose favourable opinion had decided the young painter's career.
