= Charles-Edgar de Mornay =

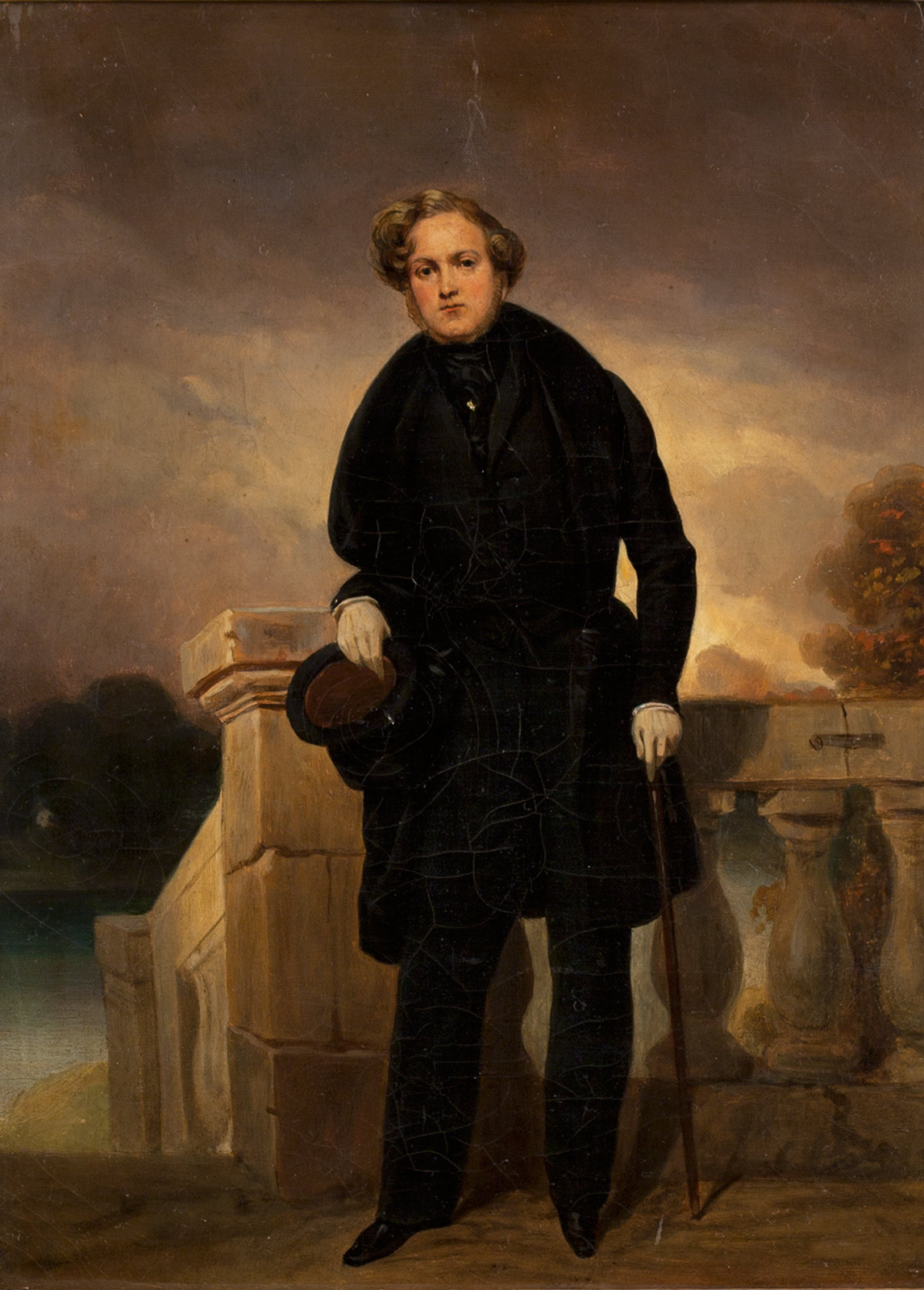
- Portrait by Pierre-Joseph Dedreux-Dorcy

French Ambassador to Morocco
- In office mid-October 1831 – April 4, 1832
- President: Louis Philippe I
- Preceded by: Ambassade de France au Maroc
- Succeeded by: André Louis Dubois (born March 8, 1903 in Bône died November 12, 1998) Préfet de police Etudes au collège de Bône, à la faculté d'Alger, à la faculté de droit de Paris. Licencié en droit.

Personal details
- Born: February 4, 1803 Paris
- Died: December 5, 1878 (aged 75) Fresneaux-Montchevreuil,
- Spouse: Yuliya Samoylova (m. 1863; div. 1863)
- Domestic partner: Mademoiselle Mars

Charles-Edgar de Mornay (February 4, 1803 in Paris - December 5, 1878 in Fresneaux-Montchevreuil), was a French diplomat and the first French ambassador to Morocco, a politician and collector of French painting.

He was a Gentleman of the Bedchamber of Charles X of France.

== Mission to North Africa ==
In mid-October 1831 Louis Philippe I sent de Mornay on a mission to Abd al-Rahman of Morocco. His task was to negotiate a peace treaty and a border delimitation with the Alawite emperor. Following the French conquest of Algeria the mission needed to establish neighbourly relations between the two countries.

His mission had an immediate success: On April 4, 1832 he was able to send a letter declaring to the general-in-chief of the staff of Algiers, Anne Jean Marie René Savary, that Morocco would abandon its claims on the region of Tlemcen and Oran, promise to remain neutral and withdraw their troops from Algeria.

At first Eugène Isabey had been approached to join the diplomatic mission to North Africa. However, when the painter returned from Algiers he had declined, unwilling to make a second trip to Africa. It was therefore Eugène Delacroix who had been chosen to accompany the mission, at his own expense. It was not until the end of 1831 that the painter and Mornay became acquainted, thanks to Henri Duponchel and Armand Bertin, at the request of Mademoiselle Mars, Mornay's official mistress and a friend of both Duponchel and Bertin. She was keen to find a pleasant traveling companion for her lover. Mornay and Delacroix dined together on New Year's Eve, accompanied by the actress.

== Continuation of his career ==
Charles-Edgar de Mornay was resident minister in Baden-Baden, then minister plenipotentiary in Stockholm.
In 1845 he was named a Peer of France.
He returned to private life in 1848.

== Gallery ==
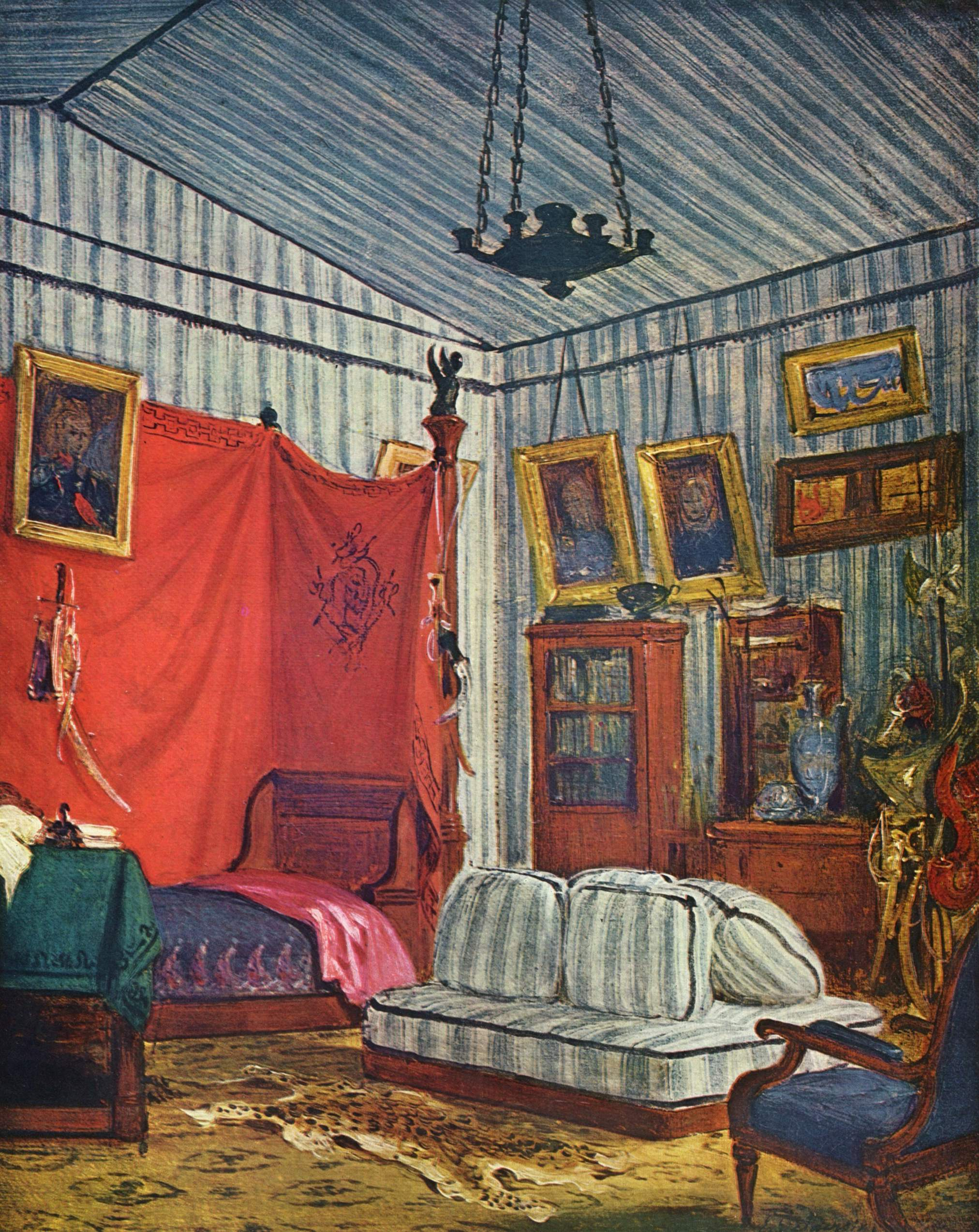
Appartement du comte de Mornay rue de Verneuil. Eugène Delacroix, avant 1833, Musée du Louvre

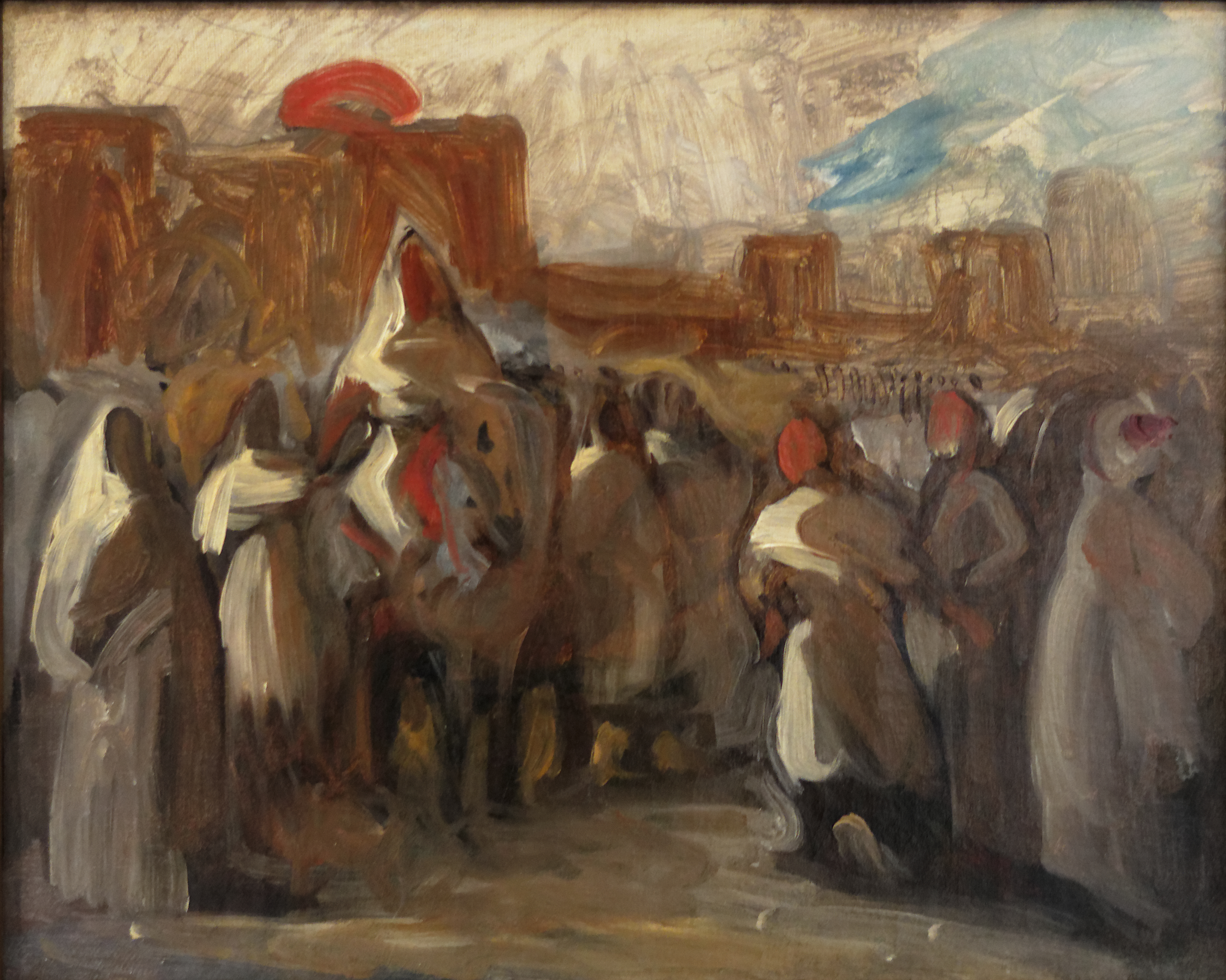
The sultan of Morocco Moulay Abd-er-Rahman receiving Count Mornay.. Eugène Delacroix. Esquisse pour le tableau présenté au salon de 1845 et conservé au Musée des Augustins de Toulouse.

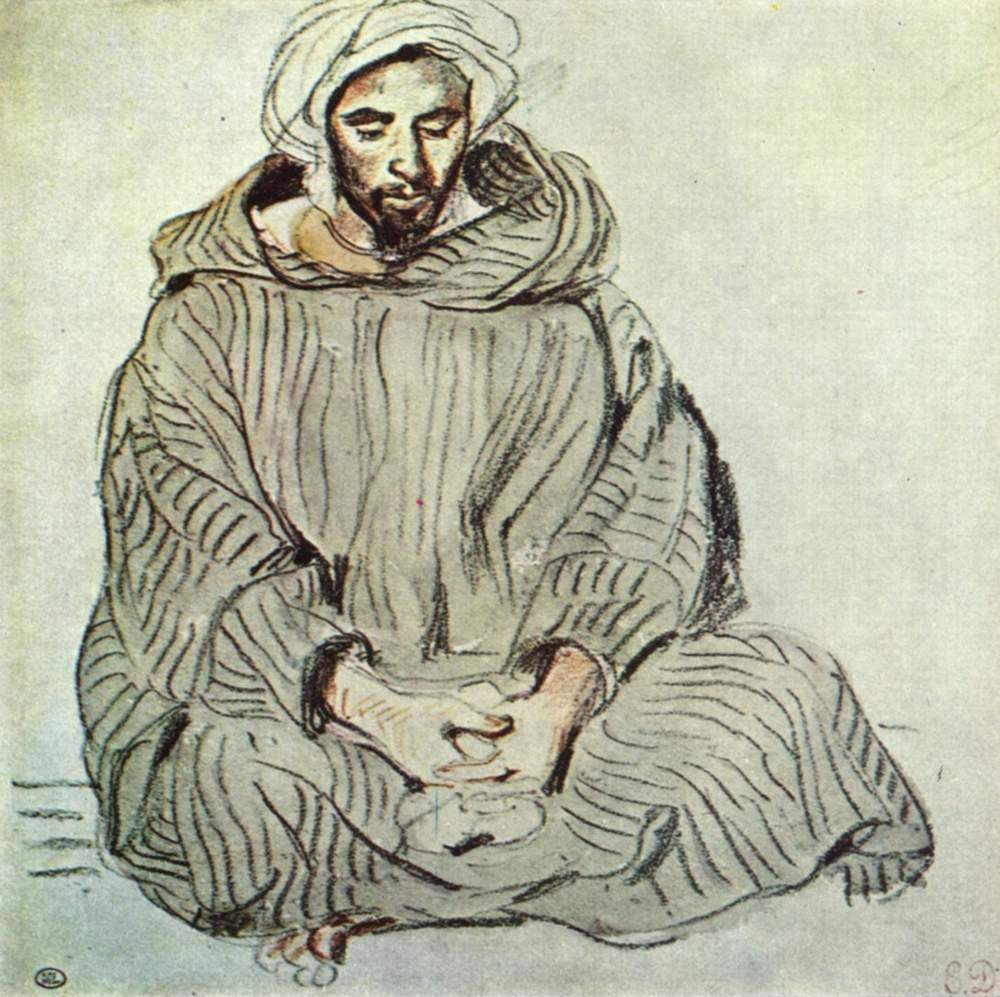
Étude d’arabe assis, Eugène Delacroix.
