= Au Rocher de Cancale =

Restaurant in Paris, France

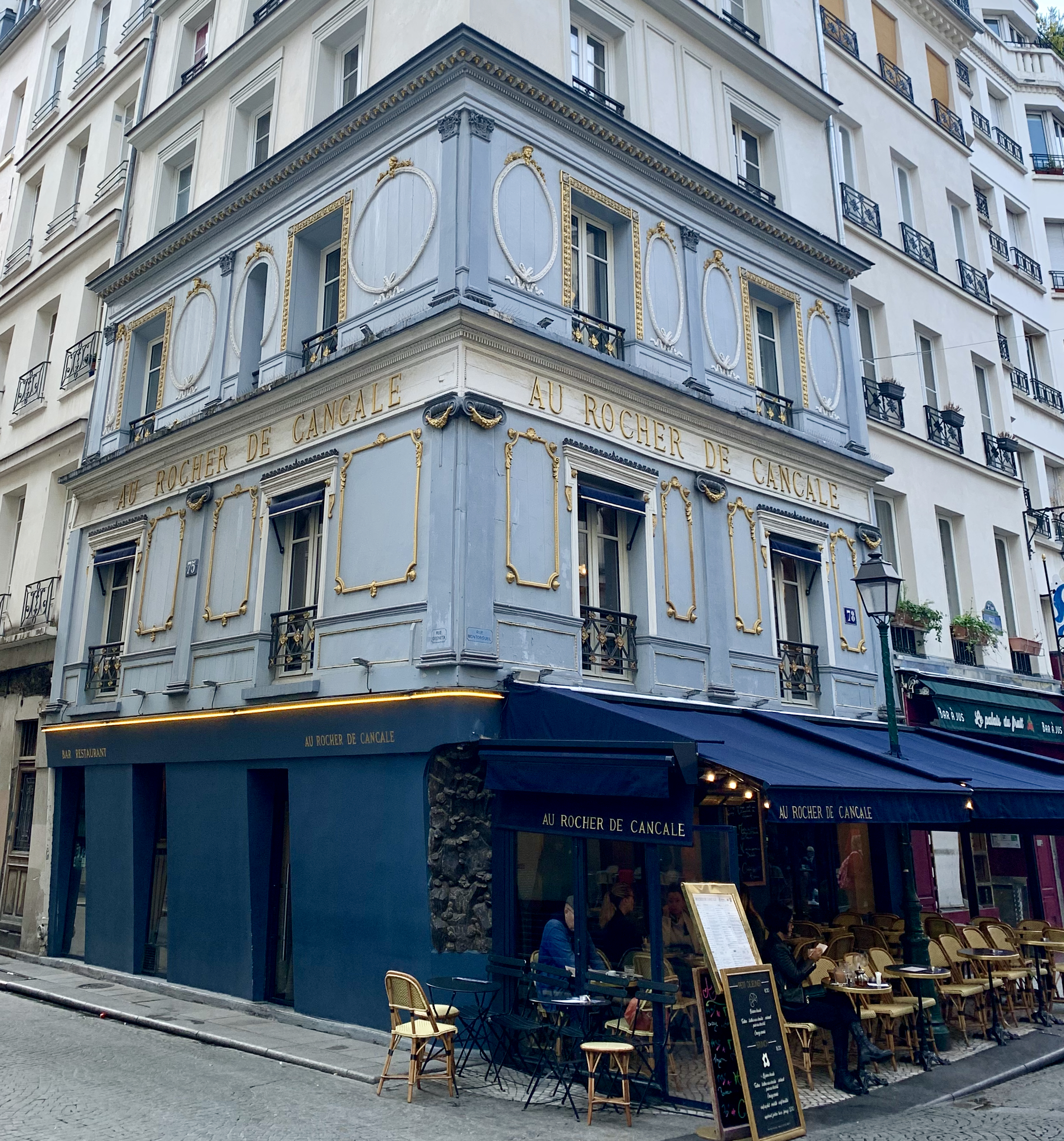
- The restaurant in 2022

- Location within Paris
- 48.86559°N 2.347153°E
- Type: Restaurant
- Location: 78, rue Montorgueil; 2nd arrondissement of Paris; France

History
- Founded: 1804

Monument historique
- Official name: Ancien restaurant Le Rocher de Cancale
- Designated: March 3, 1997
- Reference no.: PA00125451

Au Rocher de Cancale is a restaurant located in the 2nd arrondissement of Paris, France. It was very popular in the 19th century thanks to its suppers offered after theatre and opera shows.

== History ==
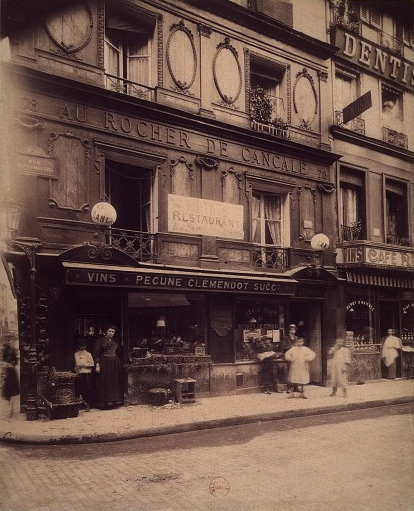
The restaurant in July 1907.

The restaurant was founded in 1804 by Alexis Balaine. It offered oyster specialities after spectacles. Dandies, Lorettes, aristocrats and Jockey Club used to meet at this restaurant, then located at 59 Rue Montorgueil. At the time, the restaurant offered an extensive list of dishes: 10 mutton, 17 veal, 11 beef and 22 poultry starters, 27 entremets and 30 desserts.

In 1809, La Reynière installed its tasting jury in the restaurant.

Honoré de Balzac, Alexandre Dumas, Théophile Gautier and Eugène Sue were patrons of the restaurant.

In 1837, chef Langlais created the "Norman sole" in Le Rocher de Cancale's kitchen.

Balaine's successor, Pierre Frédéric Borrel, went bankrupt and closed the establishment in 1846. The restaurant was latered re-opened under the same name at Rue de Richelieu.

Mr Pécune then moved the restaurant back to Rue Montorgueil (to No. 78). The work Rocher de Cancale is still in the building, as well as frescoes made by Paul Gavarni.

The building was classified as an official Historical Monument on March 3, 1977.

A building of the same name existed in Brussels in 1874.

== In popular culture ==
In Honoré de Balzac's La Comédie humaine, characters Henri de Marsay, Madame du Val-Noble, Coralie, Lucien de Rubempré, Étienne Lousteau and Dinah de La Baudraye were regular patrons of the restaurant. The restaurant is notably cited in Le Cabinet des Antiques, La Muse du département, Illusions perdues, Splendeurs et misères des courtisanes, as well as in other works.

== Bibliography ==
- Lavallée, Théophile (1857). Histoire de Paris depuis le temps des Gaulois jusqu'à nos jours (in French). Michel Lévy frères.
- Terres d'écrivains (2004). Balades littéraires dans Paris du XVIIe au XIXe siècle (in French). Nouveau Monde éditions. ISBN 2-84736-054-9.
- Bihl-Willette, Luc (1997). Des tavernes aux bistrots. Une histoire des cafés (in French). Paris: L'Âge d'Homme. ISBN 2825107735.
