= Bachivillers =

- Part of Montchevreuil
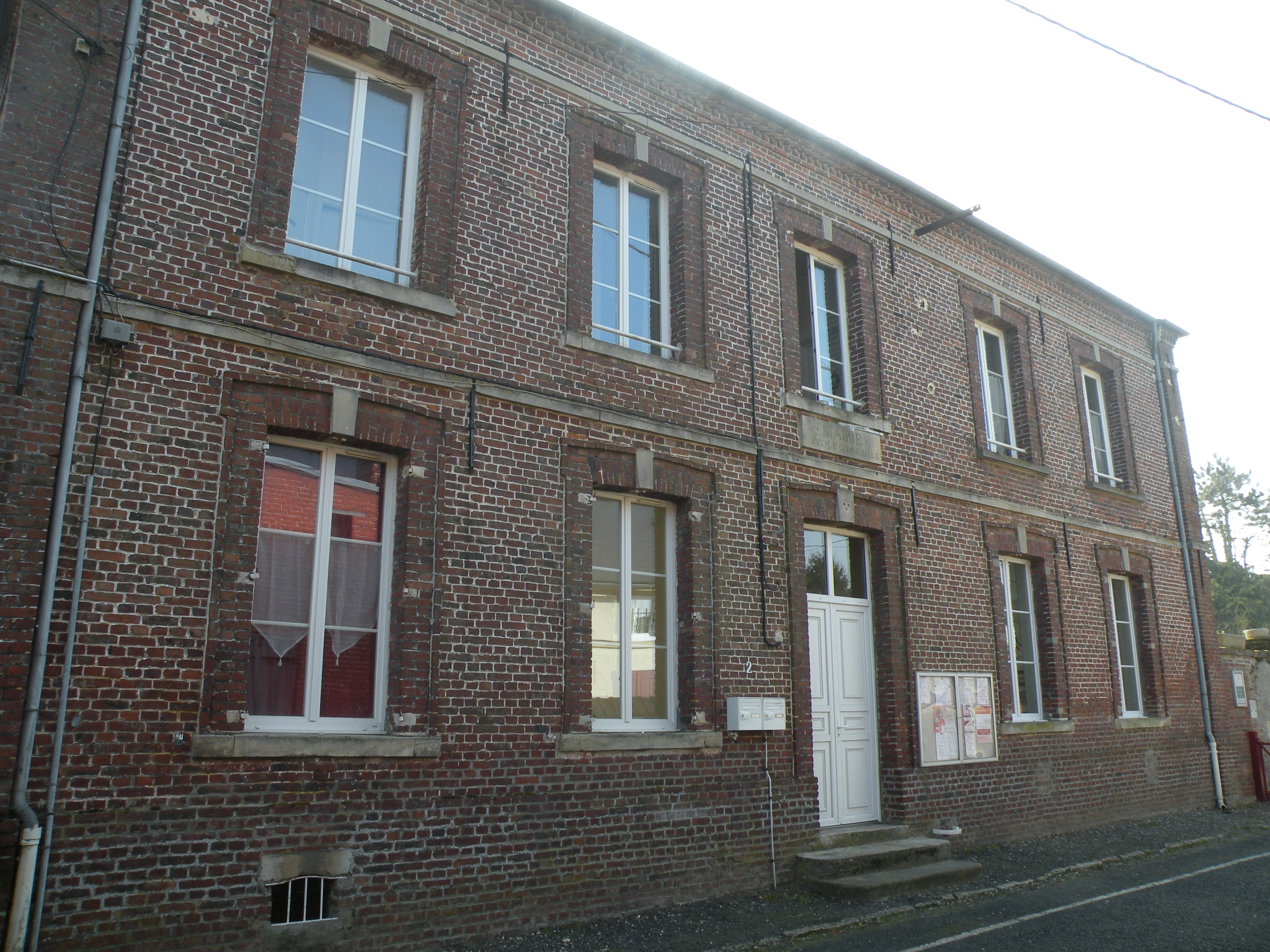
- The town hall in Bachivillers
- Location of Bachivillers
- Location within France Location within Hauts-de-France
- Coordinates: 49°17′28″N 1°57′47″E
- Country: France
- Region: Hauts-de-France
- Department: Oise
- Arrondissement: Beauvais
- Canton: Chaumont-en-Vexin
- Commune: Montchevreuil
- Area^{1}: 5.91 km^{2} (2.28 sq mi)
- Elevation: 130 m (430 ft)
- Highest elevation: 159 m (522 ft)
- Lowest elevation: 110 m (360 ft)
- Population (2023): 565
  - Density: 95.6/km^{2} (248/sq mi)
- Time zone: UTC+01:00 (CET)
  - Summer (DST): UTC+02:00 (CEST)
- Postal code: 60240
- ^{1} French Land Register data, which excludes lakes, ponds, glaciers > 1 km^{2} (0.386 sq mi or 247 acres) and river estuaries.

Bachivillers is a former commune in the Oise department in northern France. On 1 January 2019, it was merged into the new commune of Montchevreuil.

== See also ==
- Communes of the Oise department
