= Montchevreuil =

- Commune
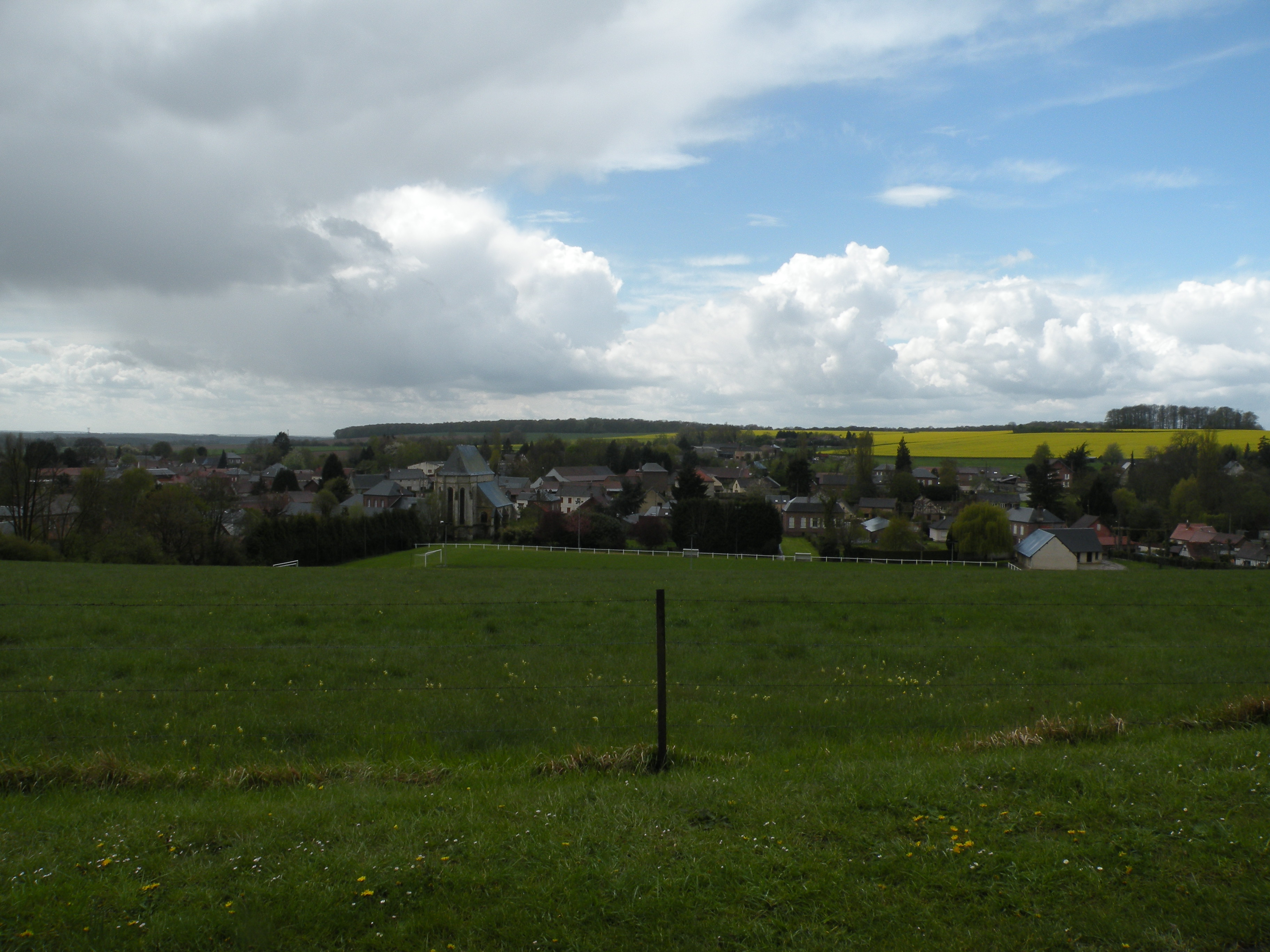
- A general view of Fresneaux-Montchevreuil
- Location of Montchevreuil
- Location within France Location within Hauts-de-France
- Coordinates: 49°16′54″N 2°00′14″E
- Country: France
- Region: Hauts-de-France
- Department: Oise
- Arrondissement: Beauvais
- Canton: Chaumont-en-Vexin
- Intercommunality: Sablons
- Area^{1}: 17.09 km^{2} (6.60 sq mi)
- Highest elevation: 186 m (610 ft)
- Lowest elevation: 102 m (335 ft)
- Population (2023): 1,326
  - Density: 77.59/km^{2} (201.0/sq mi)
- Time zone: UTC+01:00 (CET)
  - Summer (DST): UTC+02:00 (CEST)
- INSEE/Postal code: 60256 /60240
- ^{1} French Land Register data, which excludes lakes, ponds, glaciers > 1 km^{2} (0.386 sq mi or 247 acres) and river estuaries.

Montchevreuil is a commune in the Oise department in northern France. It was established on 1 January 2019 by merger of the former communes of Fresneaux-Montchevreuil (the seat) and Bachivillers.

== See also ==
- Communes of the Oise department
