= Rue Montorgueil =

Street in Paris, France

Coordinates: 48°51′53.80″N 2°20′48.70″E

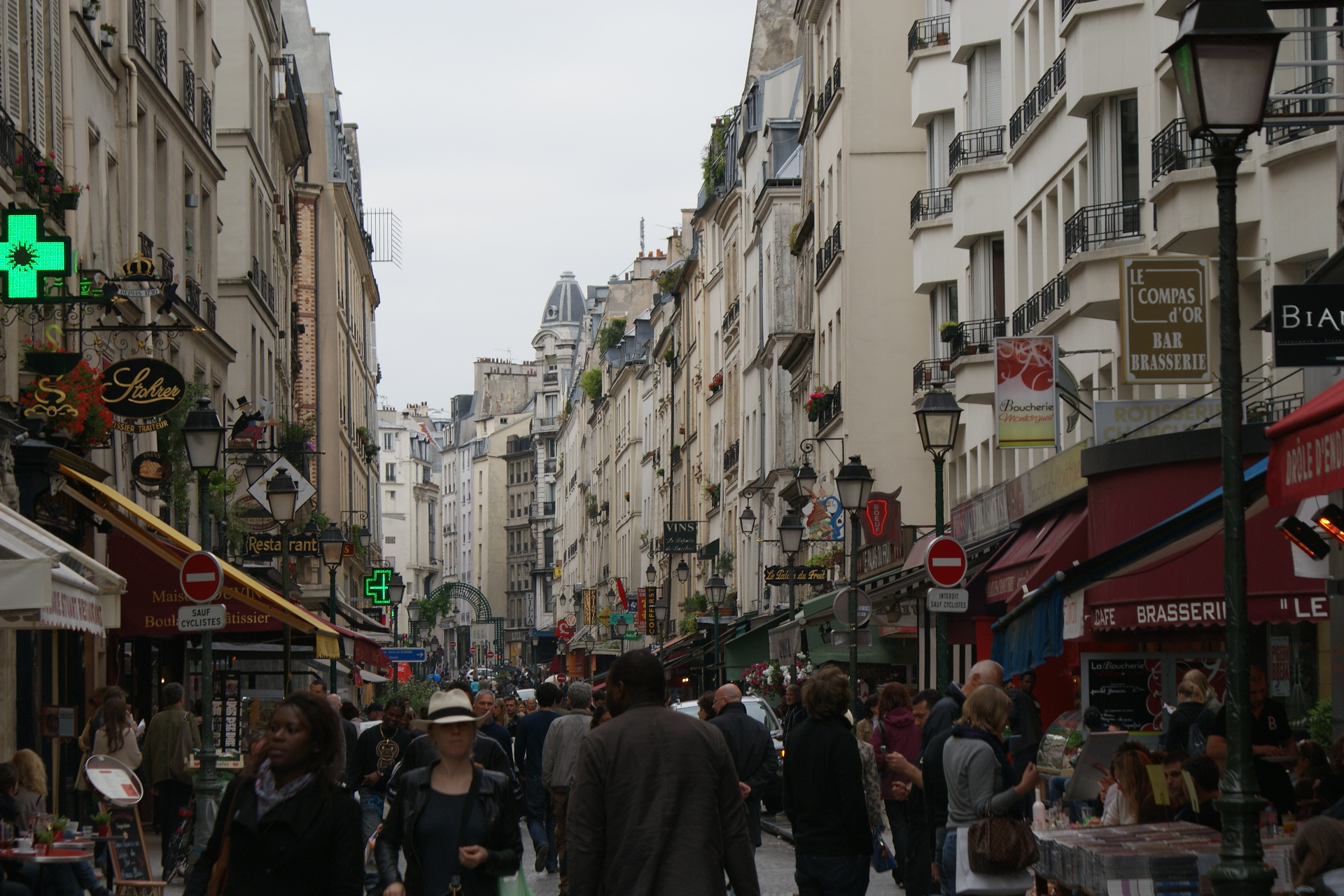
Rue Montorgueil

The Rue Montorgueil (French pronunciation: [ʁy mɔ̃tɔʁɡœj]) is a street in the 1st arrondissement and 2nd arrondissement (in the Montorgueil-Saint Denis-Les Halles district) of Paris, France. Lined with restaurants, cafés, bakeries, fish stores, cheese shops, wine shops, produce stands and flower shops, the Rue Montorgueil is a place for Parisians to socialize while doing their daily shopping. At the southernmost tip of the Rue Montorgueil is Saint-Eustache Church, and Les Halles, containing the largest indoor (mostly underground) shopping mall in central Paris; and to the north is the area known as the Grands Boulevards. While cars are not banned from the street, the priority is for pedestrians who can enjoy the cafés and shops while walking down the cobblestones.

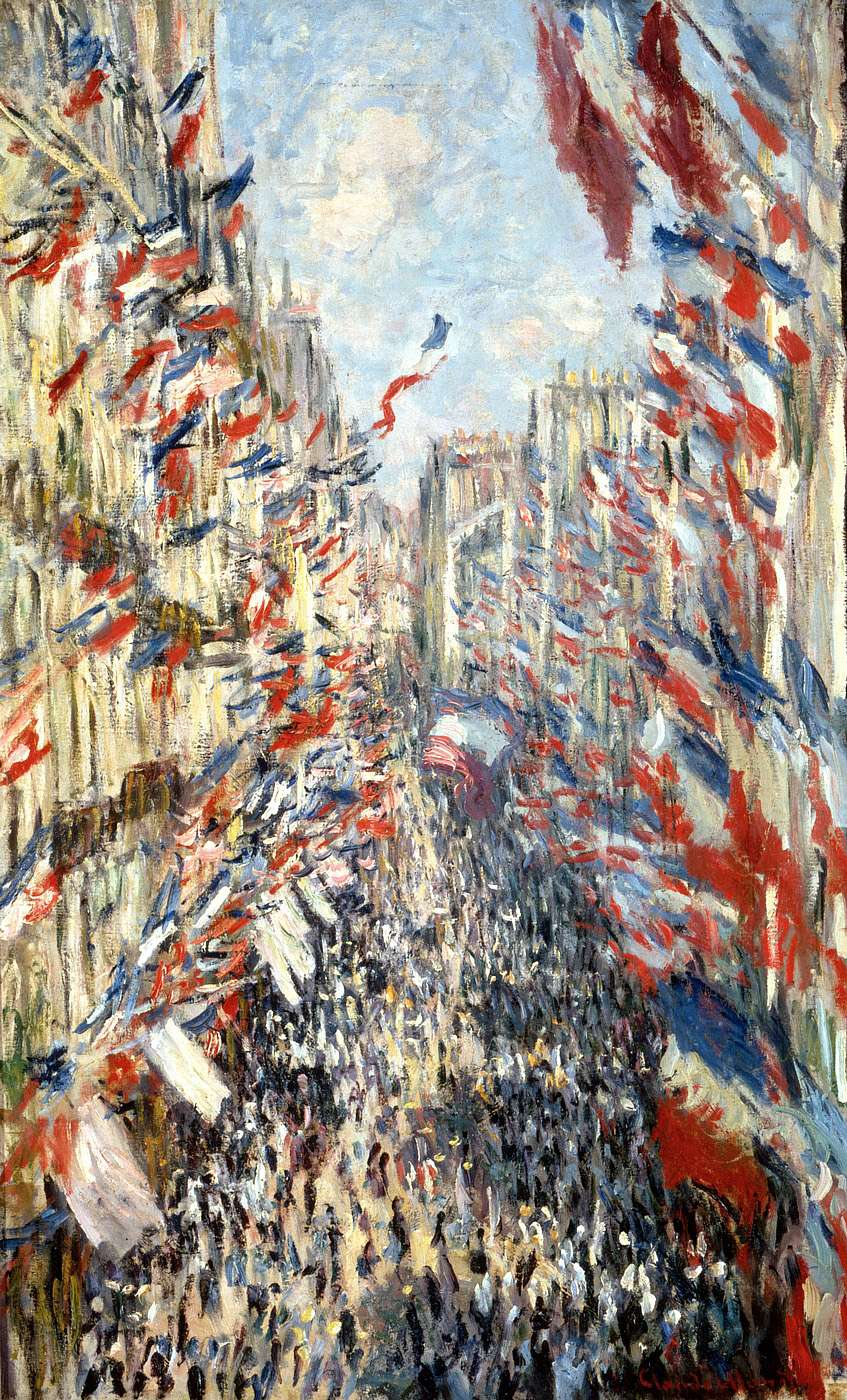
Claude Monet's depiction of Rue Montorgueil in his Rue Montorgueil, Paris, Festival of June 30, 1878

In 1878, Impressionist painter Claude Monet depicted the street in his painting Rue Montorgueil, Paris, Festival of June 30, 1878, which was decked out in flags for the Universal Exhibition.

== Famous restaurants ==
L'Escargot restaurant

- L'Escargot, 38, rue Montorgueil. Founded in 1875 by restaurateur Mignard.
- Au Rocher de Cancale
- La Maison Stohrer, 51, rue Montorgueil. This bakery opened its doors in 1730 and is one of the oldest bakeries in Paris. It was at this location that baba au rhum was invented.
