= La Maison Stohrer =

Pâtisserie in Paris, France

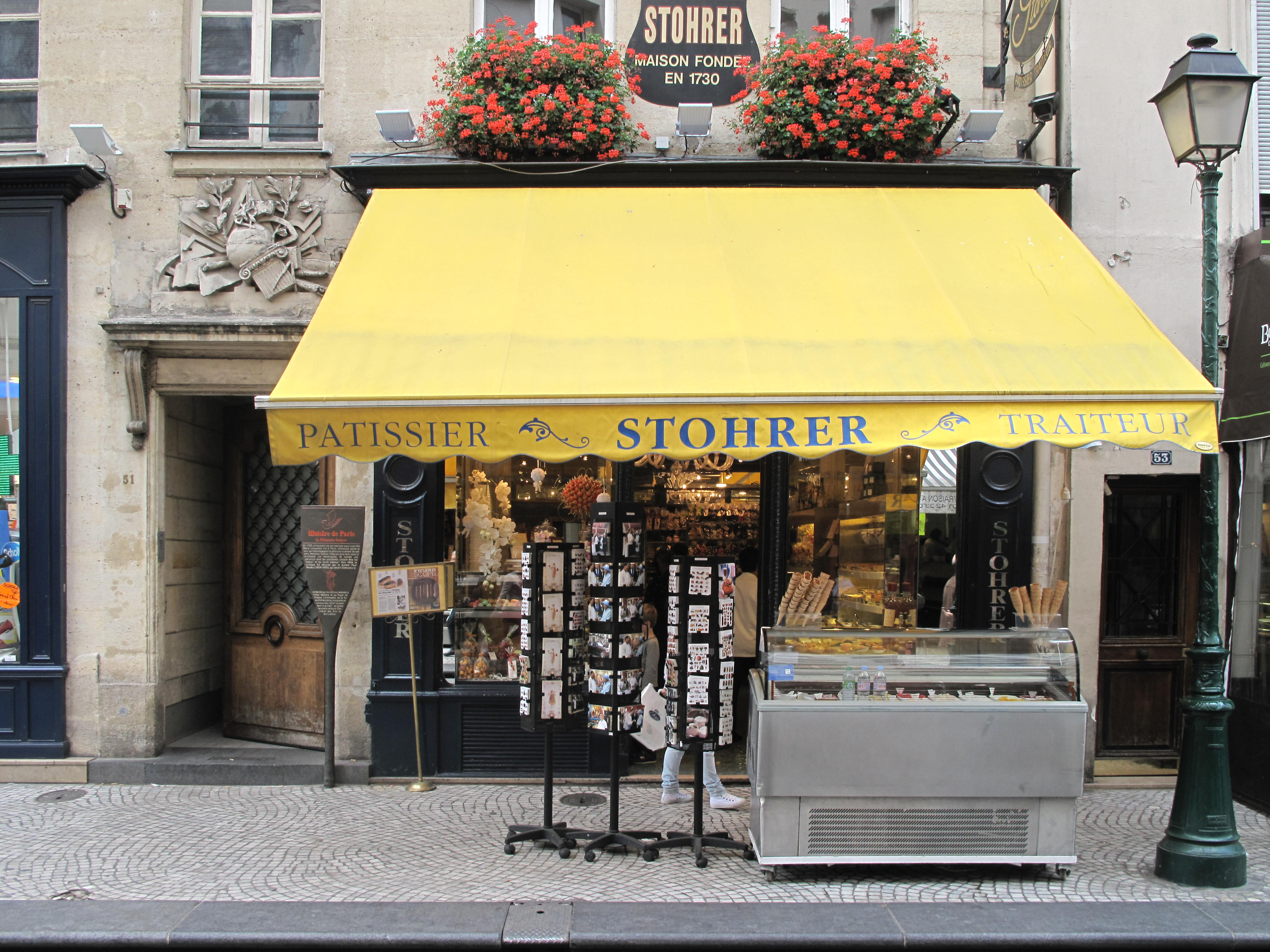
- Exterior of La Maison Stohrer in 2011
- Company type: Pâtisserie
- Industry: Restaurant
- Founded: 1730
- Founder: Nicolas Stohrer
- Website: stohrer.fr

La Maison Stohrer is a pâtisserie. Established in 1730 and located in the 2nd arrondissement of Paris, it is credited as the oldest pâtisserie in the city.

== History ==
=== Early history ===
La Maison Stohrer is credited as the oldest pâtisserie in Paris. It was founded in 1730 by Nicolas Stohrer. Stohrer worked as pastry chef to Stanisław Leszczyński, King of Poland and Grand Duke of Lithuania. In 1725 he accompanied Stanisław's daughter to France on the occasion of her marriage to Louis XV, establishing his bakery on the Rue Montorgueil in the 2nd arrondissement five years later, where it has been located since.

In 1860, the interior of the shop was decorated with frescoes commissioned from a student of Paul-Jacques-Aimé Baudry.

=== Later history ===
Elizabeth II visited the shop in 2004 during the state visit of the United Kingdom to France.

In 2017, La Maison Stohrer was acquired by the Dolfi family, who also own the Mère de Famille, the oldest chocolate factory in Paris, as well as two historic chocolate shops in France.

== Products ==
The rum baba was created at La Maison Stohrer. The shop is also known for its religieuse.
