= Fresneaux-Montchevreuil =

- Part of Montchevreuil
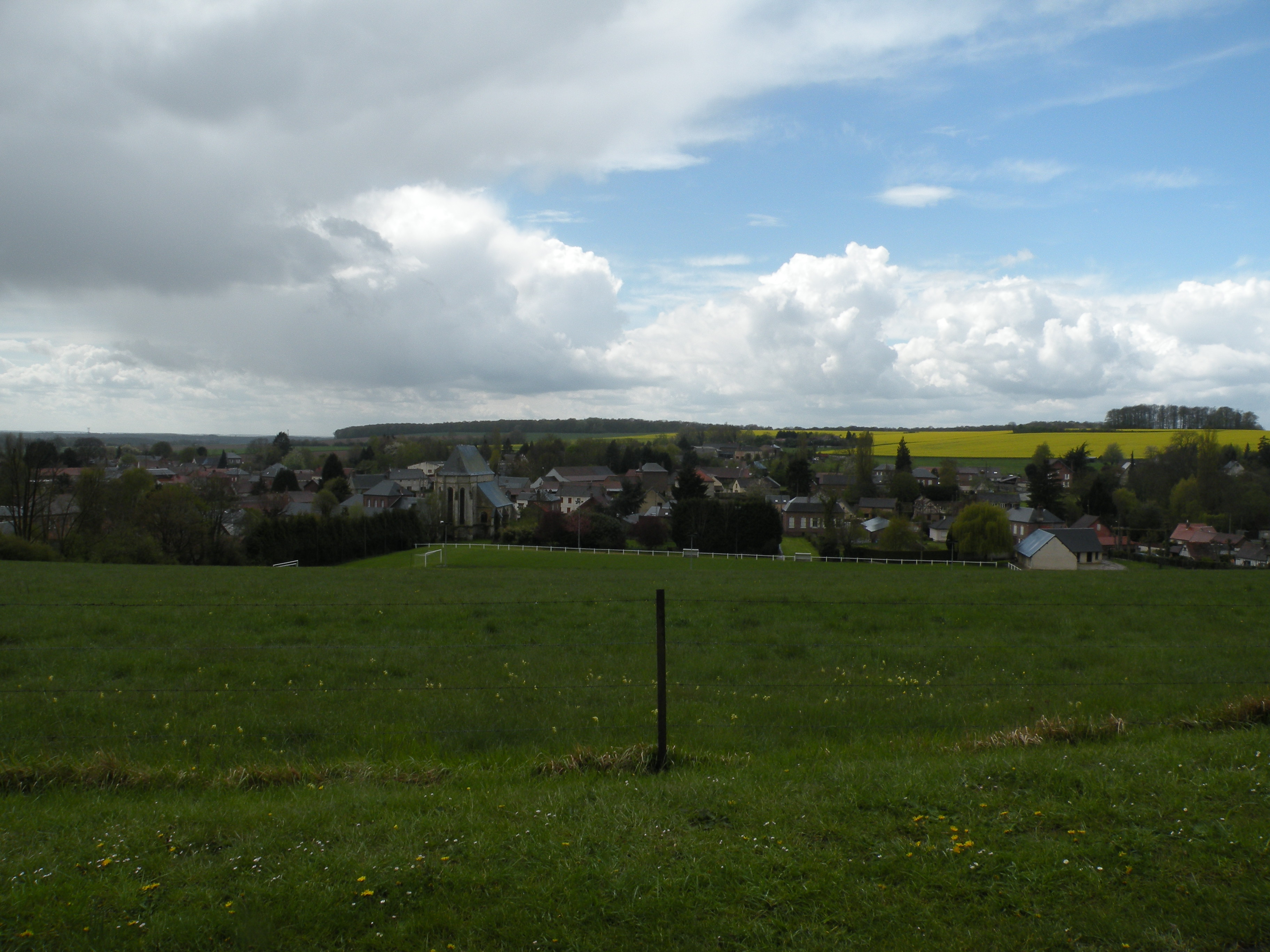
- A general view of Fresneaux-Montchevreuil
- Location of Fresneaux-Montchevreuil
- Location within France Location within Hauts-de-France
- Coordinates: 49°16′54″N 2°00′14″E
- Country: France
- Region: Hauts-de-France
- Department: Oise
- Arrondissement: Beauvais
- Canton: Chaumont-en-Vexin
- Commune: Montchevreuil
- Area^{1}: 11.18 km^{2} (4.32 sq mi)
- Elevation: 130 m (430 ft)
- Highest elevation: 186 m (610 ft)
- Lowest elevation: 102 m (335 ft)
- Population (2022): 764
  - Density: 68.3/km^{2} (177/sq mi)
- Time zone: UTC+01:00 (CET)
  - Summer (DST): UTC+02:00 (CEST)
- Postal code: 60240
- ^{1} French Land Register data, which excludes lakes, ponds, glaciers > 1 km^{2} (0.386 sq mi or 247 acres) and river estuaries.

Fresneaux-Montchevreuil (French pronunciation: [fʁeno mɔ̃ʃəvʁœj]) is a former commune in the Oise department in northern France. On 1 January 2019, it was merged into the new commune Montchevreuil.

== See also ==
- Communes of the Oise department
