= Pierre-Joseph Dedreux-Dorcy =

French painter (1789–1874)

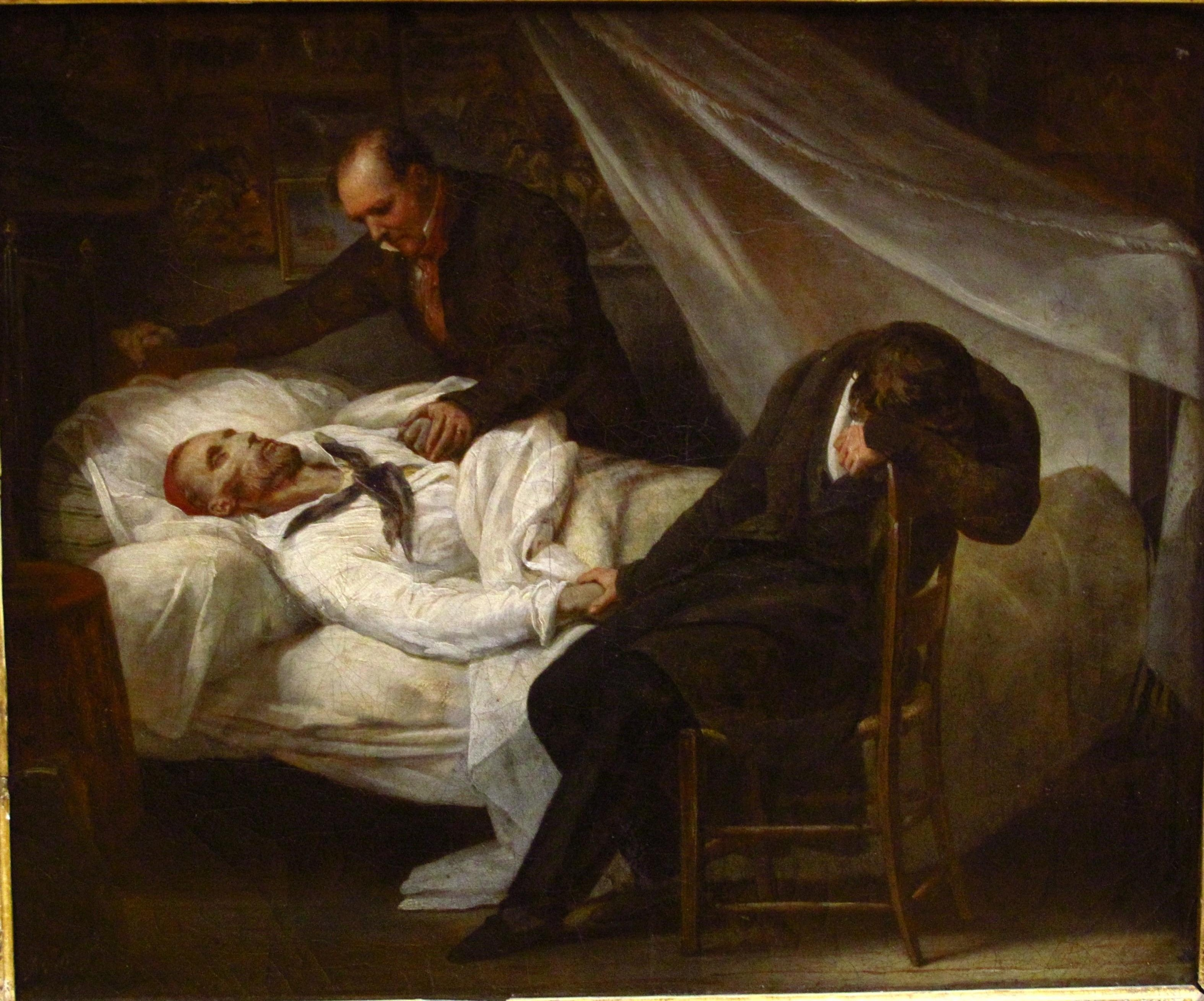
The Death of Géricault, an 1824 painting by Ary Scheffer depicting the death of Théodore Géricault, with his friends Louis Bro and Pierre-Joseph Dedreux-Dorcy (seated in the front).

Pierre-Joseph Dedreux-Dorcy (28 April 1789, Paris – 9 October 1874, Bellevue, Switzerland) was a French genre painter. His surname was Dedreux, but he was usually called Dorcy.

== Biography ==
He was the younger brother of the architect Pierre-Anne Dedreux (1788-1849, winner of the 1815 Prix de Rome), and uncle of the painter Alfred de Dreux. He studied for some time under Guérin. His paintings, one of which, called 'Bajazet et le Berger,' is in the Museum of Bordeaux, are in the style of Greuze. He also painted, together with Géricault, a picture called 'La Baigneuse'.

Dedreux-Dorcy was one of the closest friends of Géricault, having met each other in the atelier of Guérin. When Géricault fell ill after a fall of his horse, he stayed with Dorcy for over a year. Dorcy afterwards was one of the few friends of Géricault present when he died on 18 January 1824. After Géricault's death, Dedreux-Dorcy bought his masterpiece The Raft of the Medusa for 6000 francs, while the French government, bidding for the Louvre, wasn't willing to bid more than 5000 Francs. He afterwards declined an offer to resell it to an American for thrice the price he paid, and sold it one week later to the French government for the same 6000 francs, on the condition that it was to be placed in the Louvre.

== Gallery ==
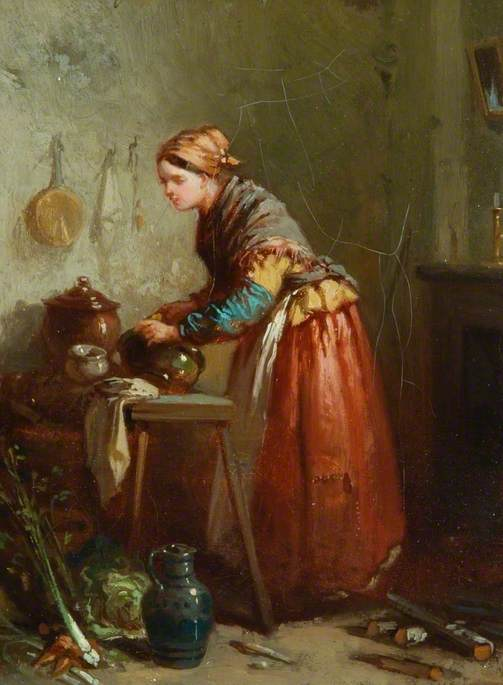
Young Woman Scouring Pans, Barnard Castle, Bowes Museum.

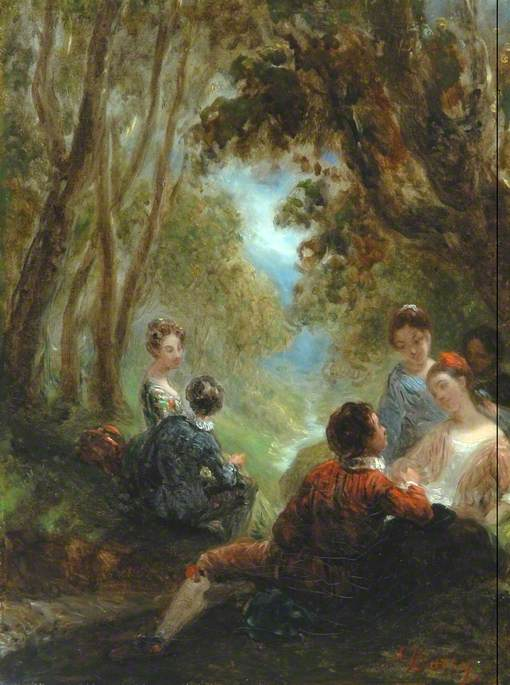
Country Party, Barnard Castle, Bowes Museum.

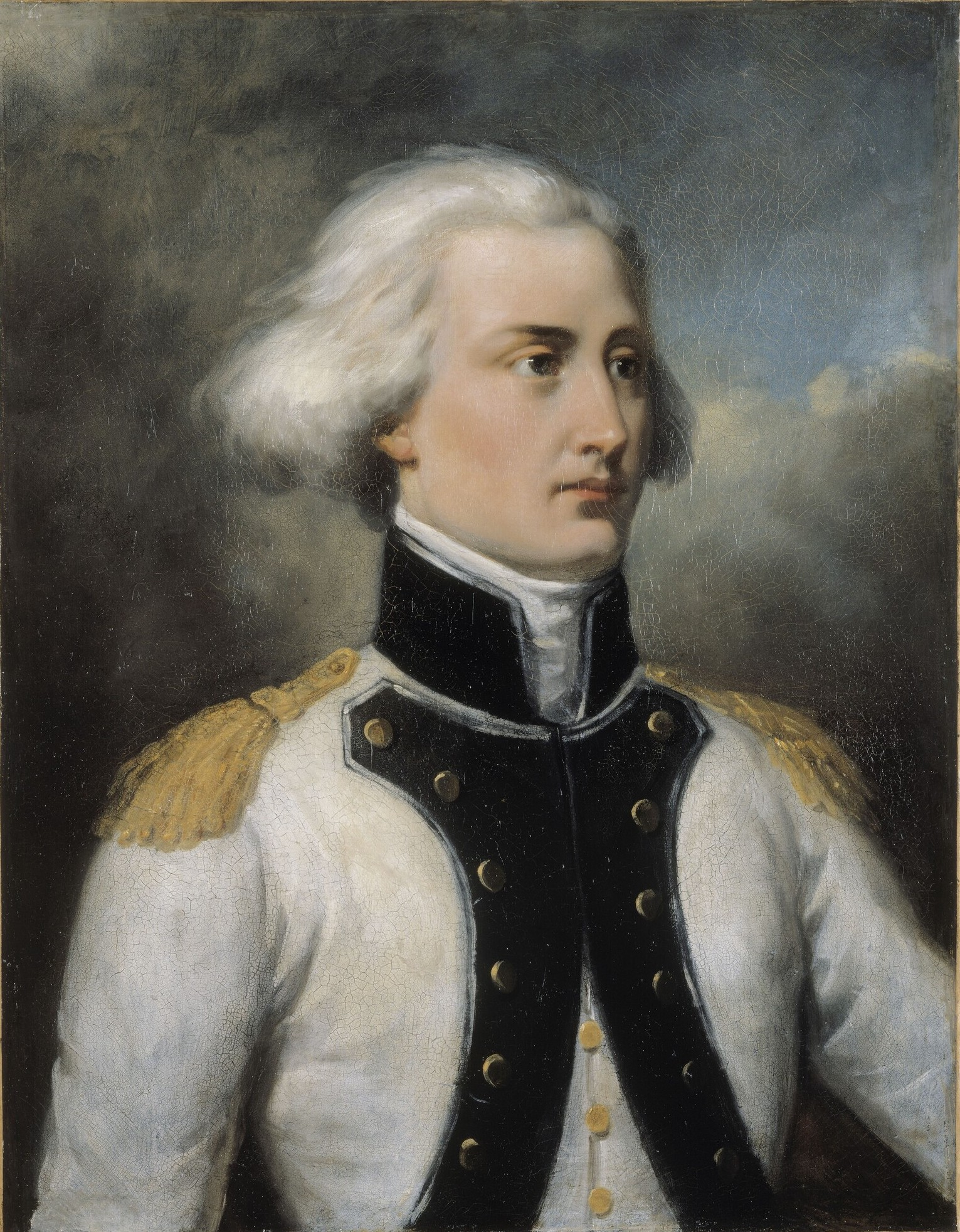
Captain Bon-Adrien Jeannot de Moncey (1754-1842), Versailles, musée de l'Histoire de France.

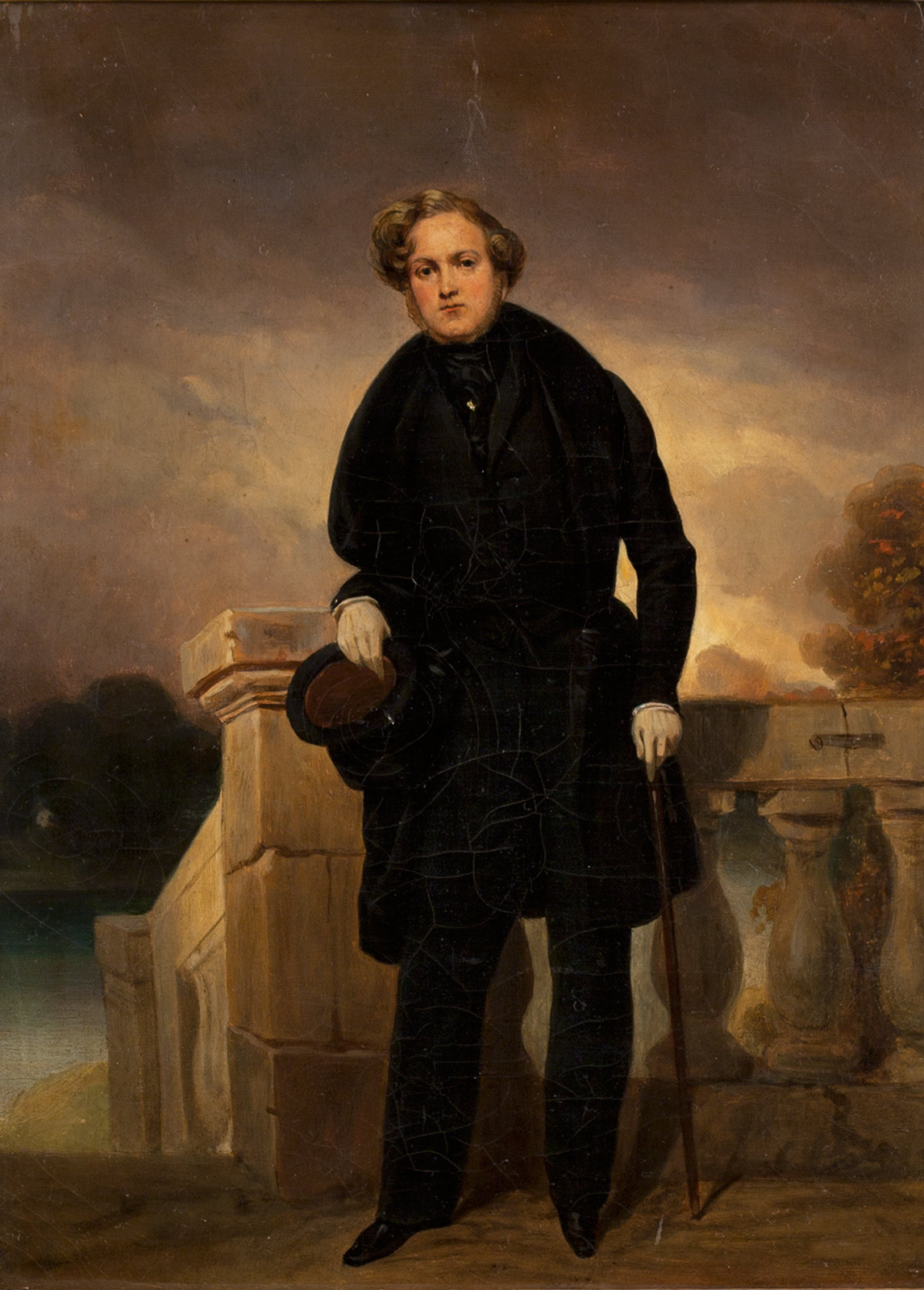
Count Charles-Edgar de Mornay (1803-1878), Paris, musée d'Orsay.

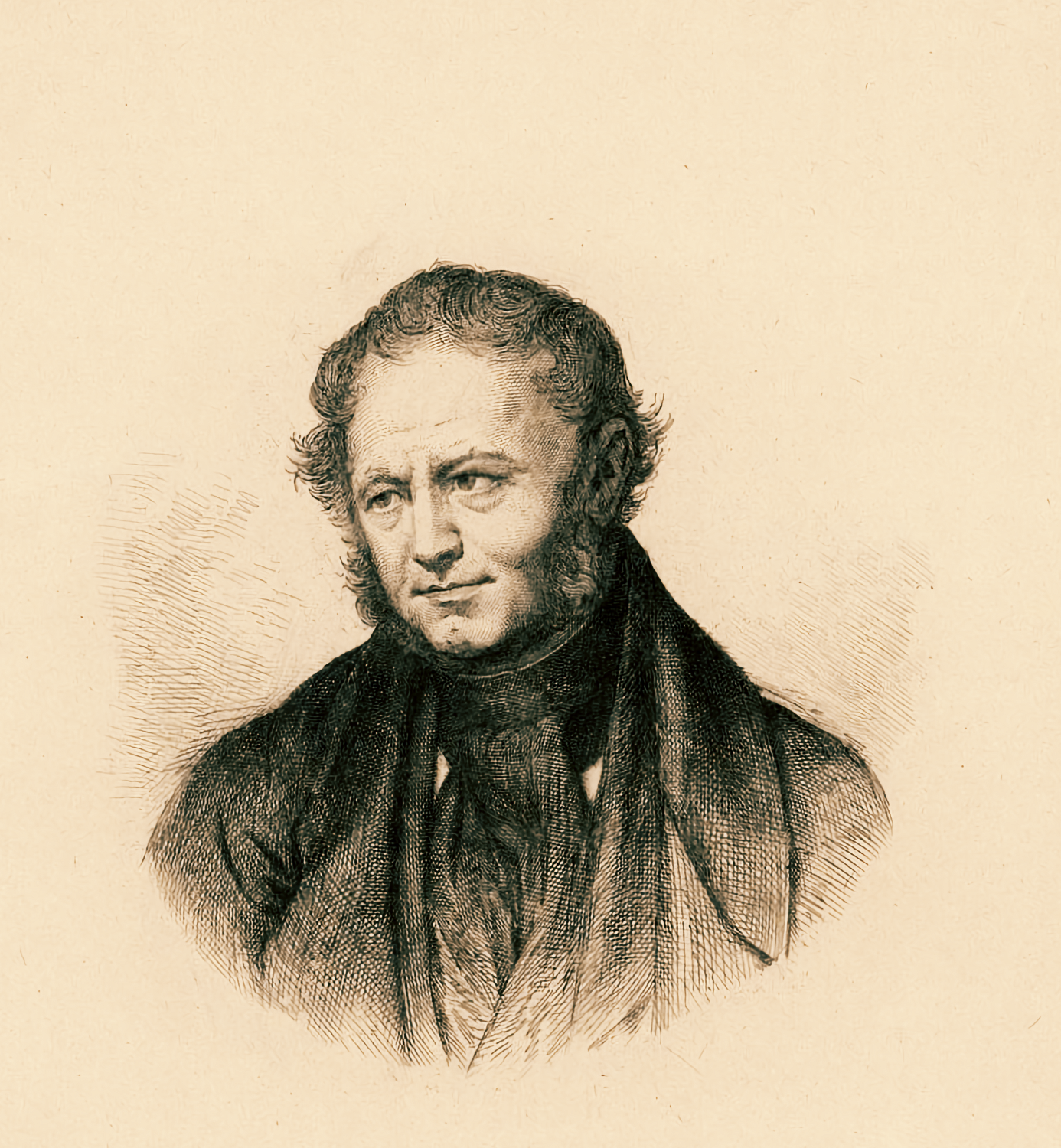
Portrait of Stendhal by Dedreux-Dorcy, engraved by
Henri-Joseph Dubouchet.
