= Lorette (prostitution) =

Type of 19th century prostitute

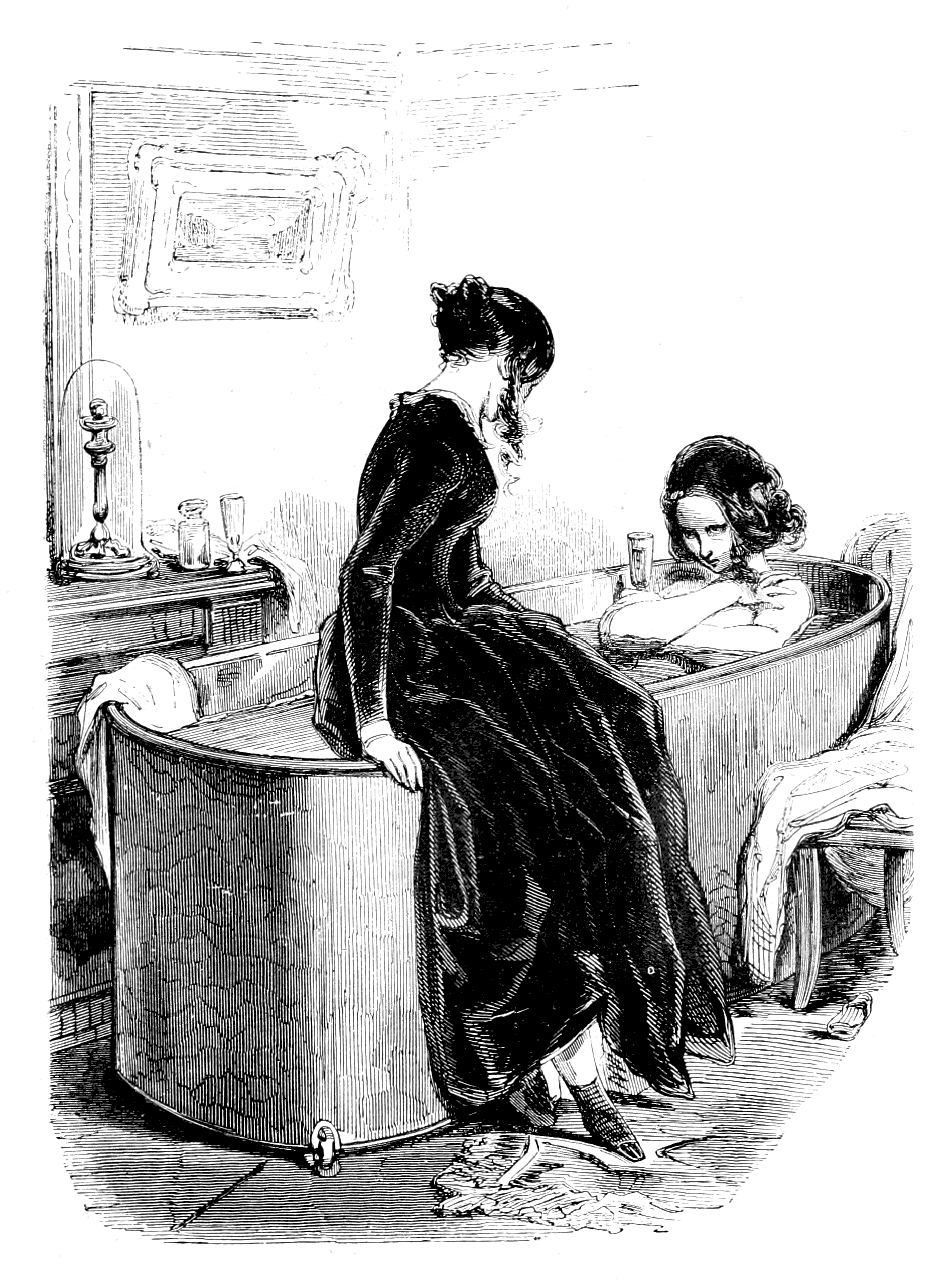
The Lorettes: illustration by Paul Gavarni and Grandville from Le Diable à Paris.

A Lorette is a type of 19th-century French prostitute. They stood between the kept women (courtesans) and the grisettes. A grisette had other employment and worked part-time as a prostitute whereas a Lorette supported herself exclusively from prostitution. The lorette shared her favours among several lovers; the Lorette's "Arthurs", as they called them, were not financially able or too fickle to have exclusivity.

The lorettes evolved into coquettes under the Second French Empire and grues by the First World War.

== Origin of the name ==
The neologism first appeared during the July monarchy (1830-1848). The name derives from the Notre-Dame-de-Lorette, one of the churches located around the old Breda street (hence their other name of brédas), part of the area of prostitution in the subdivision of Nouvelle Athènes, located in the current 9th arrondissement of Paris It was in this district that they resided for the most part at the time of Louis-Philippe.

== In literature ==
Phryne, rich of the good of more than twenty lovers,
And the neck dripping with gold and diamonds,
Irritated about the luxury of the lorettes,
And asks for a decree which limits their toilettes ...

— Auguste Barbier, in Croquis satiriques, poésies nouvelles

This breed belonged entirely to the feminine sex: it was made up of charming little beings, tidy, elegant, flirtatious, whom one could not classify according to any known type: she was neither [...] a street walker, nor a grisette, nor a courtesan./ She wasn't the bourgeois type./ And she certainly wasn't the honnest/decent woman type.

— Alexandre Dumas fils, in Filles, lorettes et courtisanes: Les serpents

women of the world departed, scandalised by the neighbourhood of lorettes

— Gustave Flaubert, in Sentimental Education, Part 2

Fie upon the fop dog, fie upon the fatuous Danish quadruped, the King Charles, the pug or rascal, so enchanted with itself that it leaps indiscreetly at the legs or on a visitor's lap, as if desperate to please, boisterous as a child, foolish as a lorette, sometimes snarling and as insolent as a servant!

— Charles Baudelaire, in Paris Spleen "L. In Praise of Dogs"

Nestor Roqueplan, the Goncourt brothers, Paul de Kock, Alexandre Dumas fils, and Henri Murger often found inspiration from what they saw as frivolous and naive demi-mondaine women. Gustave Doré engraved them in their glory and decay. Nana, by Émile Zola, describes the life and the tragic destiny of one of these lorettes.

Balzac was the subject of vehement critiques for his iniquitous treatment of prostitutes through Coralie, heroine of Illusions perdues, Esther, heroine of Splendeurs et misères des courtisanes and in Le Père Goriot. Balzac also included lorettes in Types de personnages de la Comédie humaine.

Grandville produced many illustrations of lorettes, 79 of which were published in Le Charivari during the early 1840s. He also published collections such as "les partageeuses" and "les lorettes vieillies".

== Bibliography ==
- Alhoy, Maurice (1841). Physiologie de la lorette (in French).
- Barbier, Henri Auguste (15 May 1865). "Croquis satiriques, poésies nouvelles". Revue des deux Mondes: 498–502.
- Baudelaire, Charles (2021) [1869]. Paris Spleen. New York: Contra Mundum Press. p. 142. ISBN 9781940625454.
- Benoît, Christian (2007). 250 Questions Flaneur Parisien (in French). Le gerfaut. ISBN 9782914622820.
- Dumas, Alexandre (1874). Filles, lorettes et courtisanes: Les serpents (in French). Michel Lévy frères.
- Flaubert, Gustave (2015). The Complete Works: Novels, Short Stories, Plays, Memoirs and Letters (in French). e-artnow sro. ISBN 9788026838234.
- Lascar, Alex (2010). La grisette dans les romans et Les physiologies (1825-1850) : Une incarnation de Paris. Nuances et ambiguïté d'un stéréotype.
- Pierrat, Emmanuel (2013). Les Lorettes : Paris, capitale mondiale des plaisirs au XIXe siècle (in French). Le Passage. ISBN 978-2-84742-283-2.
- Samuels, Maurice (1 January 1980). "Metaphors of Modernity: Prostitutes, Bankers, and Other Jews in Balzac's Splendeurs et Miseres Des Courtisanes". French Studies. XXXIII (suppl): 811–813. doi:10.1093/fs/xxxiii.suppl.811. ISSN 0016-1128 – via Questia.
