= Paul Gavarni =

French caricaturist (1804–1866)

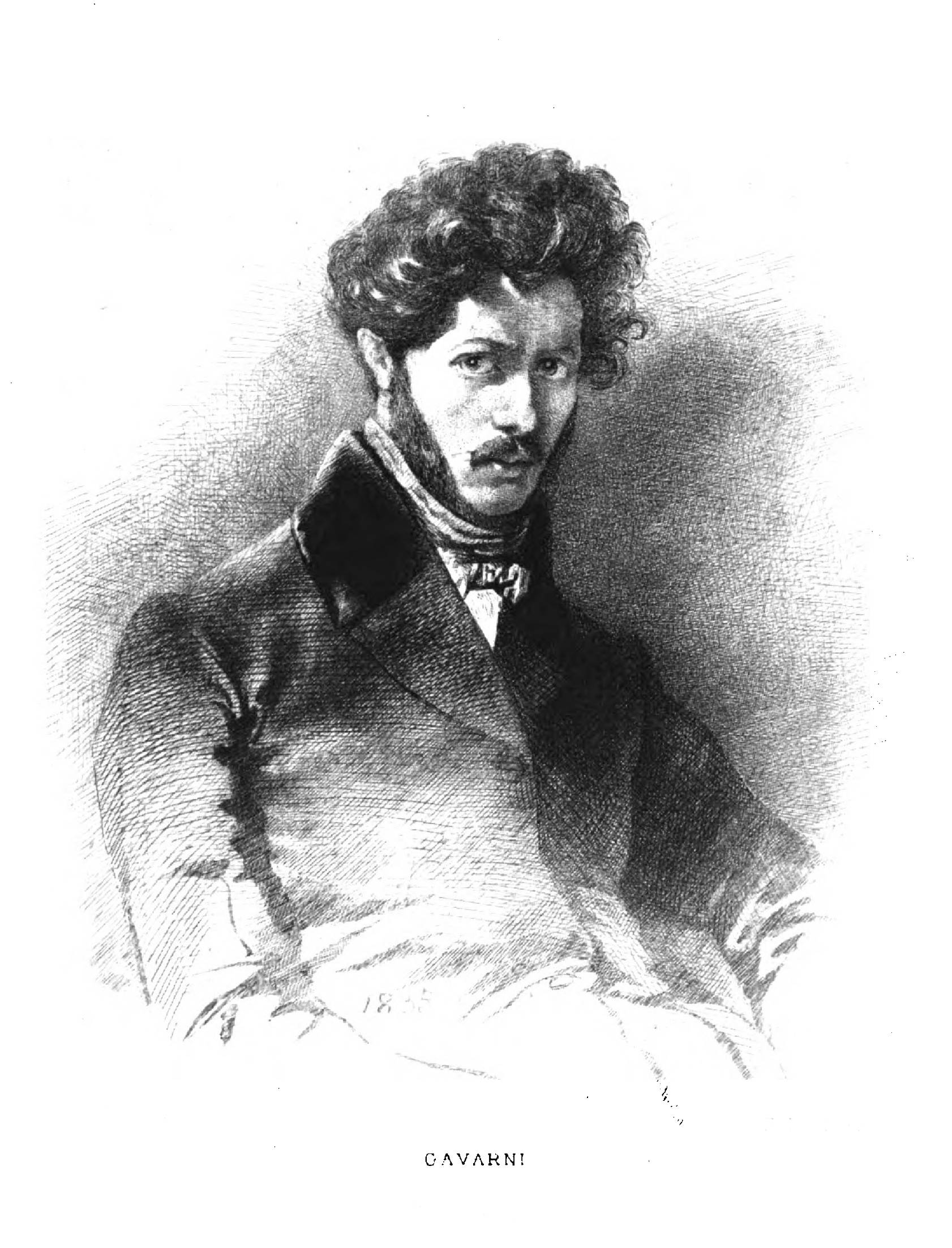
Gavarni by Émile Boilvin, from a self-portrait

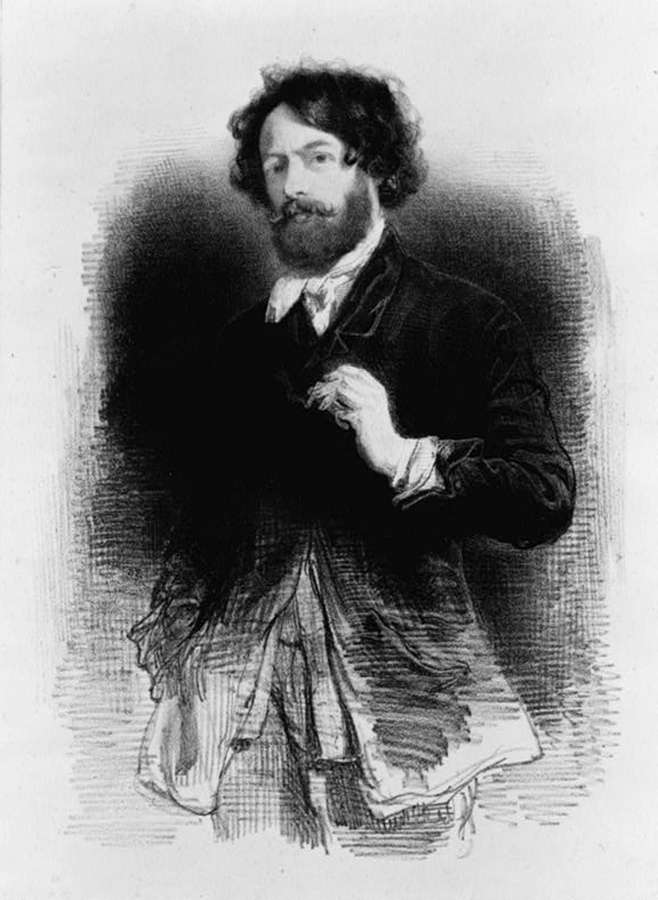
Self portrait by Gavarni.

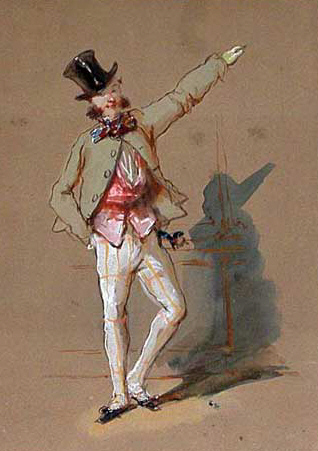
A Parisian dandy, watercolour by Gavarni.

Paul Gavarni was the pen name of Sulpice Guillaume Chevalier (13 January 1804 – 24 November 1866), a French illustrator, born in Paris.

== Early career ==
Gavarni's father, Sulpice Chevalier, was from a family line of coopers from Burgundy. Paul began work as a mechanical worker in a machine factory but he saw that to make any progress in his profession, he had to be able to draw; accordingly in his spare time in the evenings, he took classes in drawing. He devoted his special attention to architectural and mechanical drawing and worked at land surveying and mapping which led to his obtaining a position with the Government Ordnance Department as a draughtsman.

== Pen name ==
The story is told that he took his name from Gavarnie in Luz-Saint-Sauveur where he had taken a journey into the Pyrenees.

His first published drawings were for the magazine Journal des modes.

At the time, Gavarni was barely thirty years of age. His sharp and witty drawings gave these generally commonplace and unartistic figures a life-likeness and an expression which soon won him a name in fashionable circles. He gradually gave greater attention to this more congenial work, and ultimately stopped working as an engineer to become the director of the journal Les Gens du monde.

Gavarni followed his interests, and began a series of lithographed sketches in which he portrayed the most striking characteristics, foibles and vices of the various classes of French society. The letterpress explanations attached to his drawings were short, but were forcible and humorous, if sometimes trivial, and were adapted to the particular subjects. At first he confined himself to the study of Parisian manners, more especially those of the Parisian youth.

== Publications ==
Most of his best work appeared in Le Charivari. He had been invited by the editor François Caboche to draw for the magazine. Gavarni had never drawn caricatures and was reluctant to accept the request but was persuaded to submit some drawings for approval. This he did and they were accepted but he did not care for the captions which were added by the magazine editors. Thereafter, he started writing his own. This was the beginning of the Boites aux lettres series.

Some of his pictures appeared in L'Illustration. He also illustrated Honoré de Balzac's novels, and Eugène Sue's Wandering Jew.

== Illustrated works ==
Among his illustrated works were Les Lorettes, Les Actrices, Les Coulisses, Les Fasizionables, Les Gentilshommes bourgeois, Les Artistes, Les Débardeurs, Clichy, Les Étudiants de Paris, Les Baliverneries parisiennes, Les Plaisirs champêtres, Les Bals masqués, Le Carnaval, Les Souvenirs du carnaval, Les Souvenirs du bal Chicard, La Vie des jeunes hommes, and Les Patois de Paris. He had now ceased to be director of Les Gens du monde; but he was engaged as ordinary caricaturist of Le Charivari, and, while making the fortune of the paper, he made his own. His name was exceedingly popular, and his illustrations for books were eagerly sought for by publishers. Le Juif errant, by Eugene Sue (1843, 4 vols. 8vo), the French translation of Hoffman's tales (1843, 8 vo), the first collective edition of Balzac's works (Paris, Houssiaux, 1850, 20 vols. 8 vo), Le Diable à Paris (1844–1846, 2 vols. 4 vo), Les Français peints par eux-mêmes (1840–1843, 9 vols. 8vo), the collection of Physiologies published by Aubert in 38 vols. 18mo (1840–1842), all owed a great part of their success at the time, and are still sought for, on account of the clever and telling sketches contributed by Gavarni.

== Change in focus ==
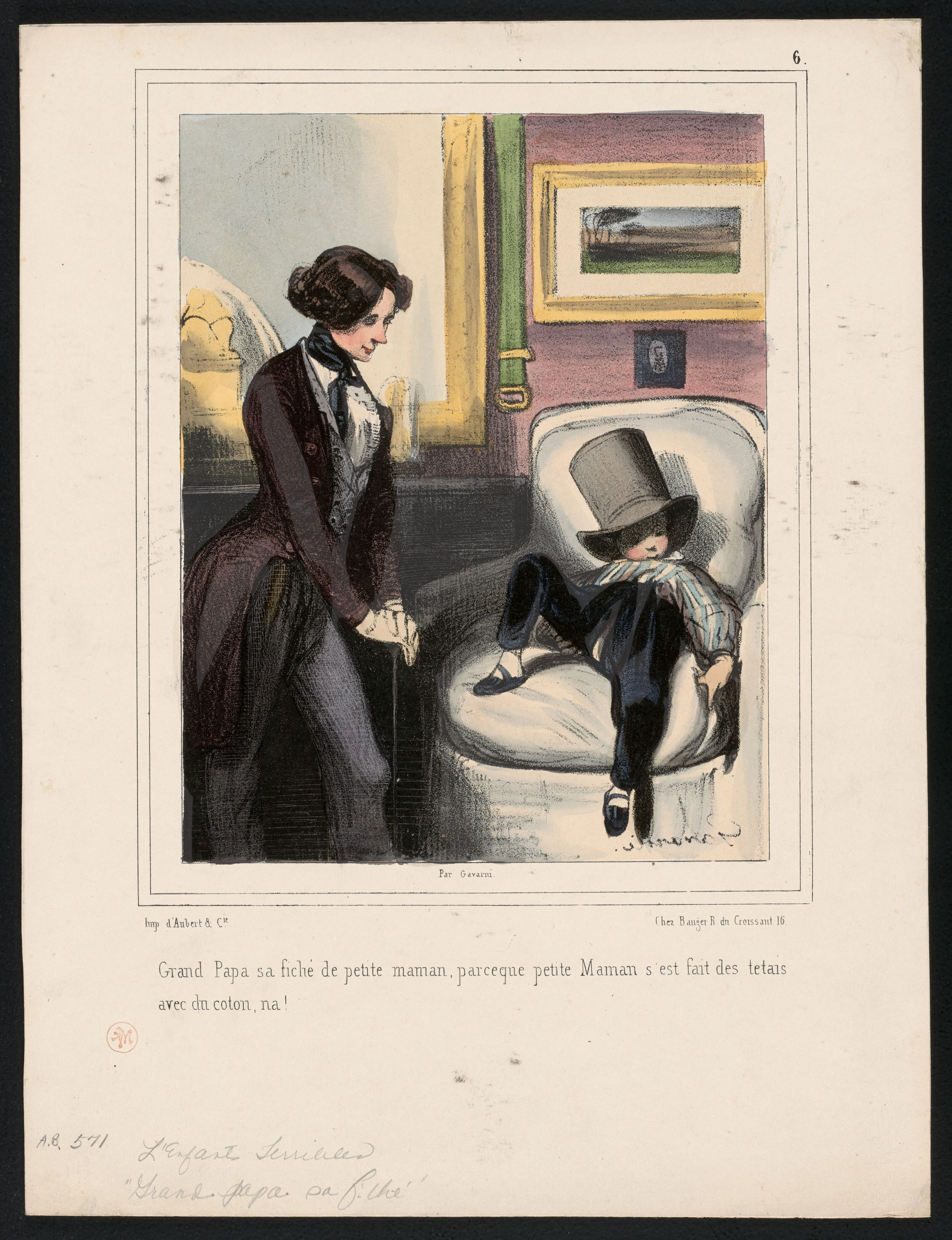
Grand papa sa fiché de petite maman, parce que petite maman s'est fait des tetais - avec du coton, na!, [Grandpa made fun of mommy because mommy made herself some boobs—out of cotton ha!] 1839

A single frontispiece or vignette was sometimes enough to secure the sale of a new book. Always desiring to enlarge the field of his observations, Gavarni soon abandoned his once favourite topics. He no longer limited himself to such types as the lorette and the Parisian student, or to the description of the noisy and popular pleasures of the capital, but turned his mirror to the grotesque sides of family life and of humanity at large. Les Enfants terribles, Les Parents terribles, Les Fourberies des femmes, La Politique des femmes, Les Mans vengs, Les Nuances du sentiment, Les Rives, Les Petits Jeux de société, Les Fetus Malheurs du bonheur, Les Impressions de ménage, Les Interjections, Les Traductions en langue vulgaire, Les Propos de Thomas Vireloque, etc., were composed at this time, and are his most elevated productions. But while showing the same power of irony as his former works, enhanced by a deeper insight into human nature, they generally bear the stamp of a bitter and even sometimes gloomy philosophy.

At one point Gavarni was imprisoned for debt in the debtors' prison of Clichy. After his release, he published his experiences in a work called L'Argent ("Money").

== Visit to England ==
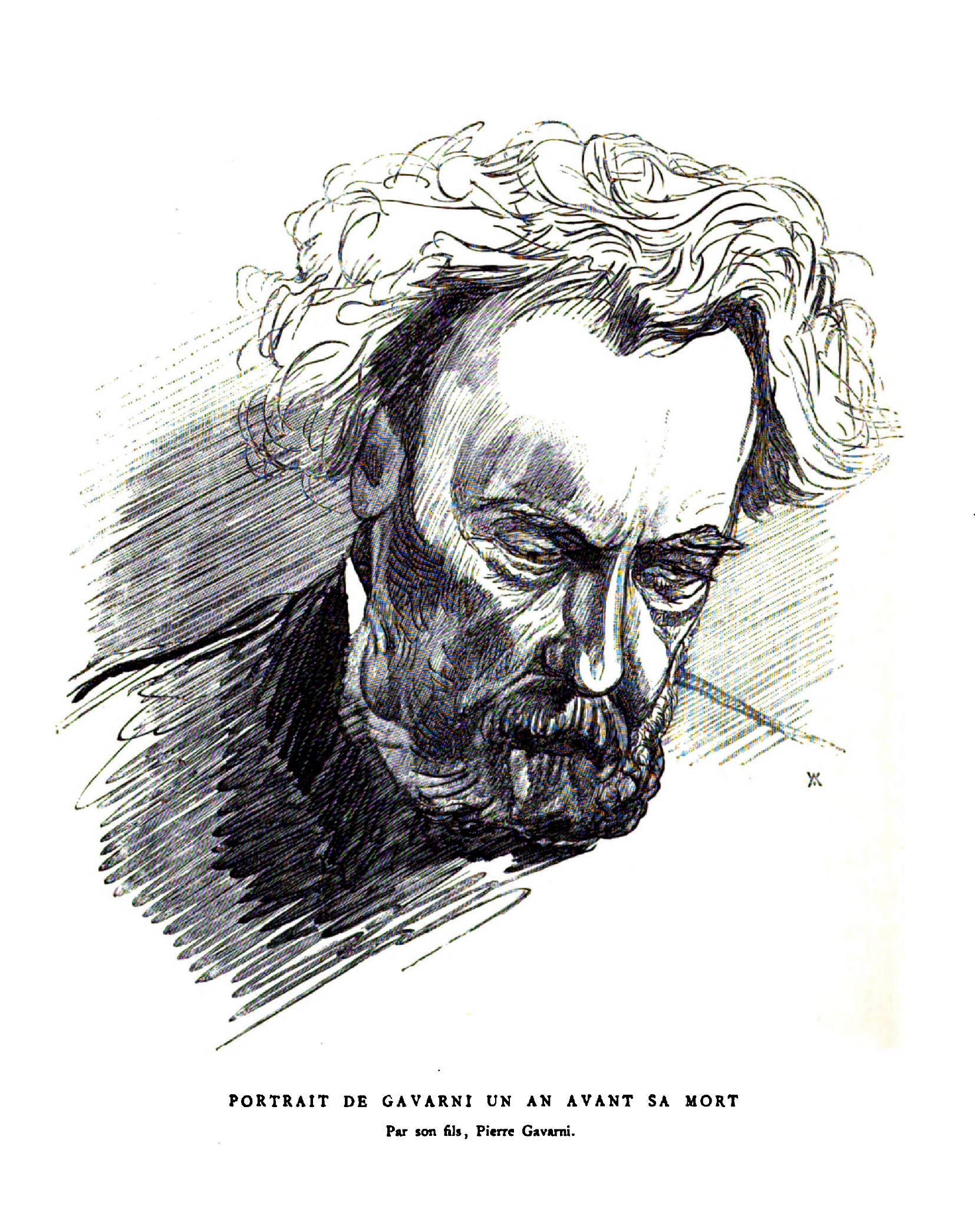
1865 portrait of Gavarni by his son Pierre

Gavarni visited England in 1849. On his return his impressions were published in the book Londres et les Anglais, illustrés par Gavarni (1862) by Émile de la Bédollière.

Most of these last compositions appeared in the weekly paper L'Illustration. In 1857 he published in one volume the series entitled Masques et visages (1 vol. 12 mo), and in 1869, about two years after his death, his last artistic work, Les Douze Mois (1 vol. fol.), was given to the world. Gavarni was much engaged, during the last period of his life, in scientific pursuits, and this fact must perhaps be connected with the great change which then took place in his manner as an artist. He sent several communications to the Académie des Sciences, and until his death on 23 November 1866 he was eagerly interested in the question of aerial navigation. It is said that he made experiments on a large scale with a view to finding the means of directing balloons; but it seems that he was not as successful in this line as his fellow artist, the caricaturist and photographer, Nadar.

== Legacy ==
Charles Baudelaire references Gavarni in his poem "L'Idéal", contrasting his own preference for vigour in women with Gavarni's troupeau gazouillant de beautés d'hôpital ("twittering flock of hospital beauties").

== Collections and catalogues ==
Gavarni's Œuvres choisies was published in 1845, followed in 1850 by two volumes named Perles et Parures. Some essays in prose and in verse written by him were collected by one of his biographers, Charles Yriarte, and published in 1869. Gavarni l'homme et l'œuvre by Edmond and Jules de Goncourt was published in 1873. A catalogue raisonné of Gavarni's works was published by J. Armehault and E. Bocher, Paris in 1873.
