= Jacques Raige-Delorme =

French physician and librarian

- Born: 18 November 1795; Montargis, Centre-Val de Loire, France
- Died: 22 January 1887 (aged 91); Paris, France
- Occupations: Physician, librarian

Jacques Raige-Delorme (18 November 1795, Montargis – 22 January 1887, Paris) was a French medical doctor and librarian, known for his work involving medical dictionaries.

He was the maternal grandfather of Philippe Chaslin.

== Career ==
Jacques Raige-Delorme studied medicine in Paris and received his doctorate in 1819 with the dissertation "Considérations médico-légales sur l'empoisonnement par les substances corrosives". In 1836 he began work as an assistant librarian at the Faculty of Medicine in Paris. Following the death of Jean-Eugène Dezeimeris in 1852 he was named chief librarian. From 1823 to 1854 he was the principal editor of the journal "Archives générales de médecine".

== Published works ==
With Amédée Dechambre, he published Dictionnaire encyclopédique des sciences médicales (1864–), an encyclopedia on medical science that was published in five installments consisting of 100 volumes overall. He also made important contributions to the following dictionaries:

- Dictionnaire historique de la médecine ancienne et moderne (1828–39, with Jean-Eugène Dezeimeris and Charles-Prosper Ollivier d'Angers) – Historical dictionary on ancient and modern medicine.
- Nouveau dictionnaire lexicographique et descriptif des sciences médicales et vétérinaires (1851–63, with Henri Marie Bouley, Charles Victor Daremberg) – New lexicographical and descriptive dictionary of medical and veterinary sciences.

Among his other written efforts were the necrologies of Pierre Augustin Béclard (1825), Étienne-Jean Georget (1828), Jean-Eugène Dezeimeris (1852) and François Louis Isidore Valleix (1855).
