= Charles-Prosper Ollivier d'Angers =

French neurologist (1796–1845)

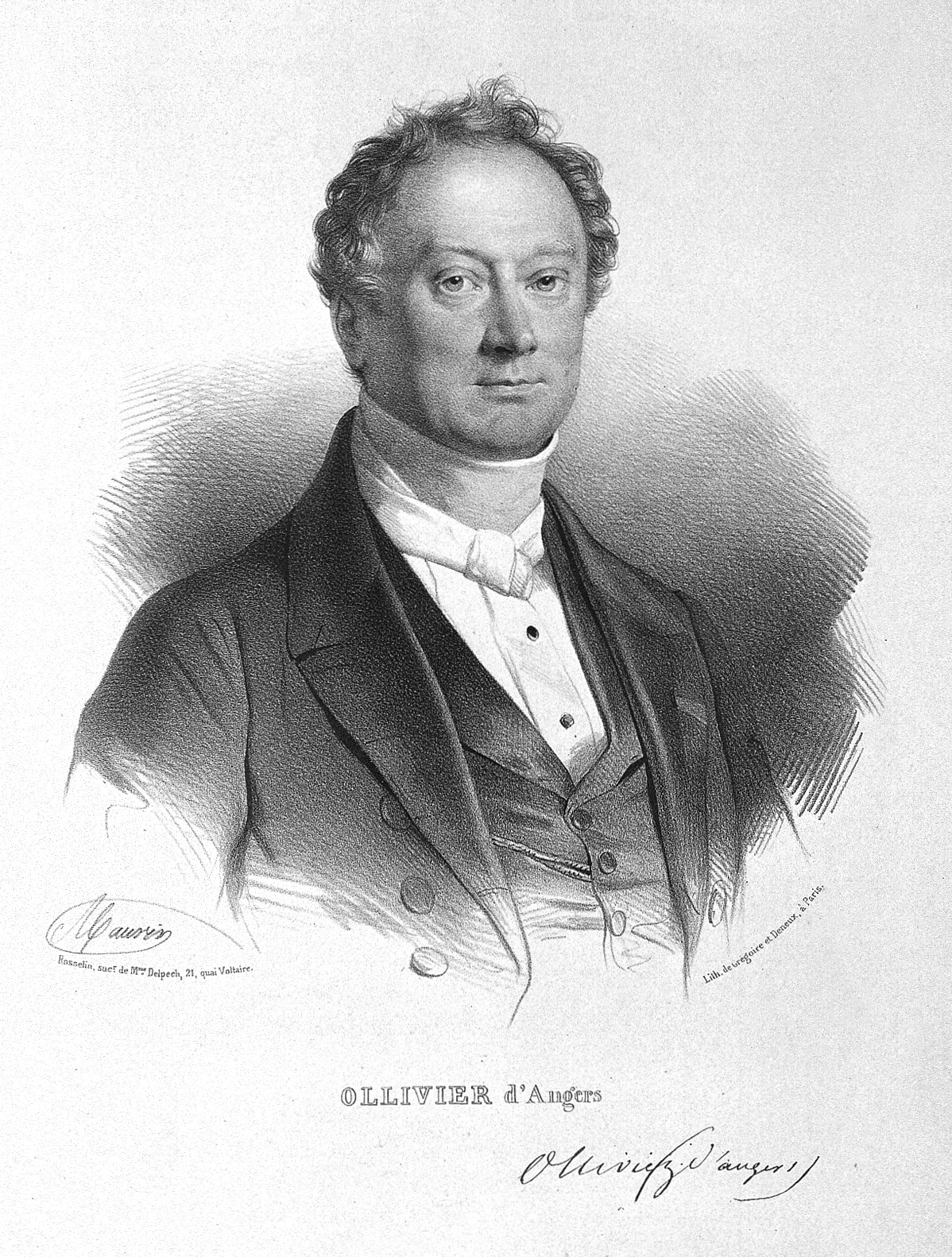
Charles-Prosper Ollivier d'Angers

Charles-Prosper Ollivier d'Angers (11 October 1796 in Angers – 12 March 1845 in Paris) was a French pathologist and clinician, best known for his early investigations of the spinal cord.

In 1823 he obtained his medical doctorate in Paris under the supervision of Pierre Augustin Béclard. During the following year, he published "Traité des maladies de la moelle épinière" (Treatise on the maladies of the spinal cord), a remarkable pioneer study in regards to the anatomy, physiology and pathology of the spinal cord. The books' expanded edition was released in 1827, and a third edition was published in 1837. In these works, he described the first case of, what was most likely, a disease known today as multiple sclerosis. He is also credited with coining the term "syringomyelia".

He took part in the second edition of Adelon's "Dictionnaire de médecine" (30 volumes), and was co-editor, with Jean-Eugène Dezeimeris and Jacques Raige-Delorme, towards the publication of "Dictionnaire historique de la médecine ancienne et moderne" (Historical dictionary of ancient and modern medicine). He also made contributions to Charles-Michel Billard's re-edition of "Traité des maladies des enfants nouveau-nés et à la mamelle" (Treatise on maladies of the new-born). In addition, he published numerous articles in the fields of toxicology and forensic medicine.

In 1835 he became a member of the Académie Nationale de Médecine.
