= James Pradier =

Swiss-French sculptor (1790–1852)

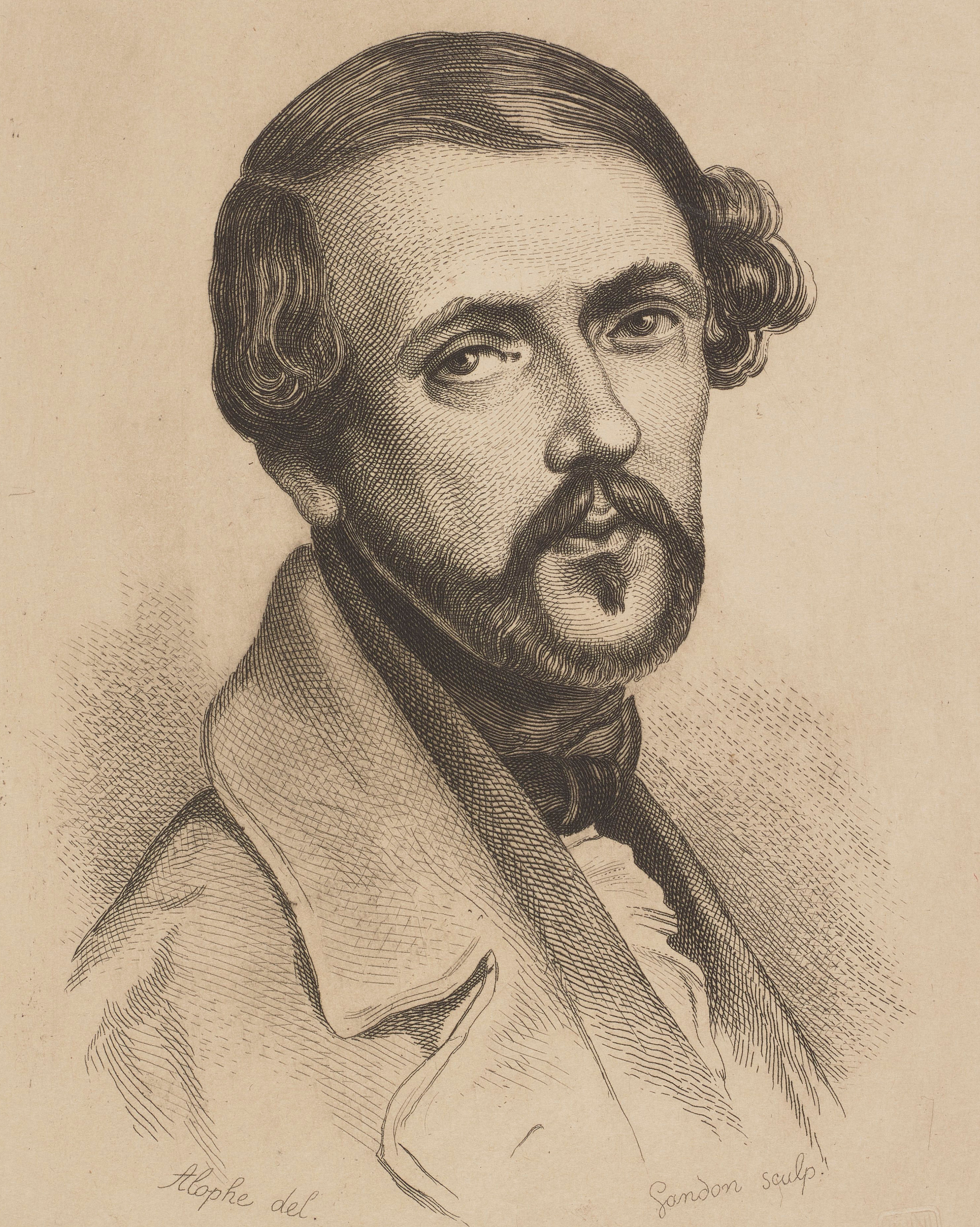
James Pradier, portrait by Marie-Alexandre Alophe

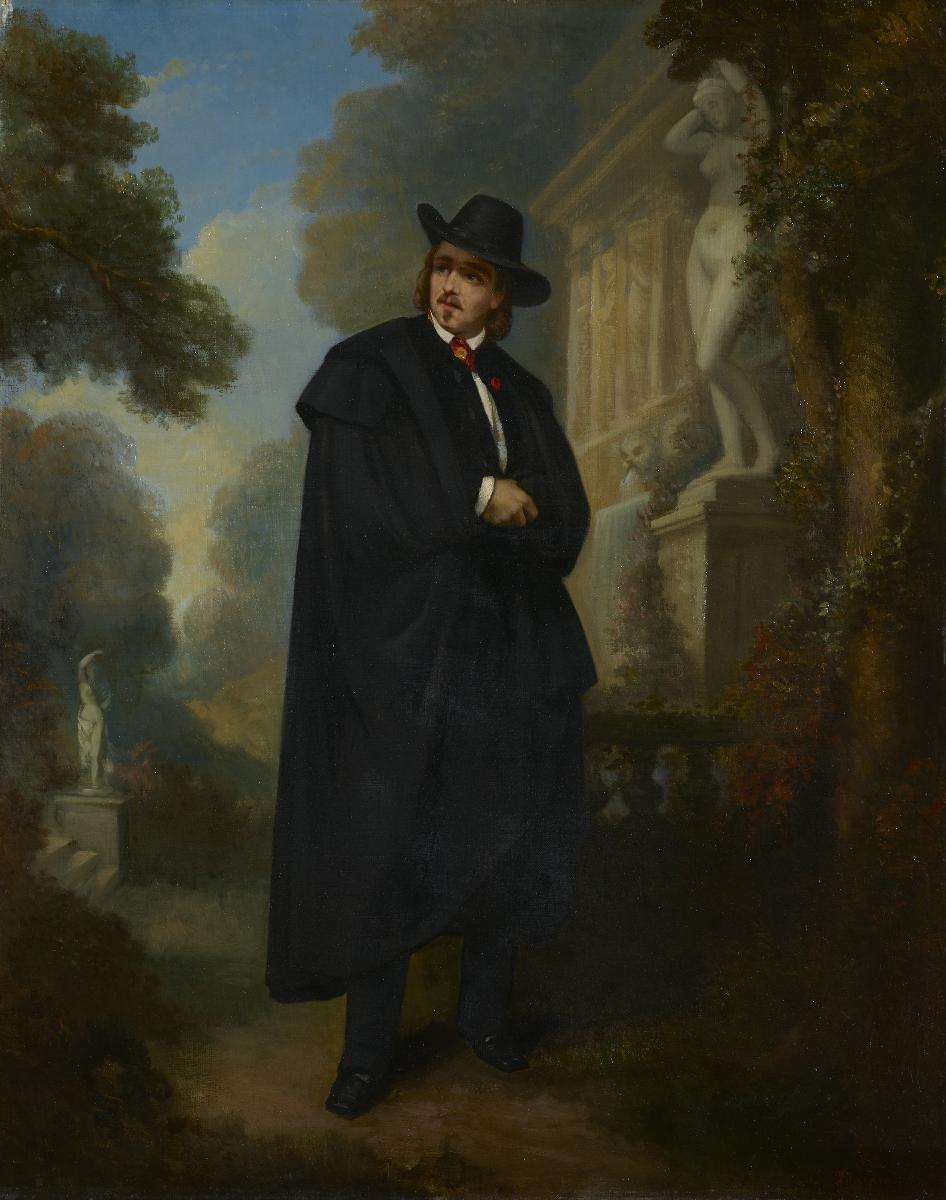
Jean-Baptiste Marie Fouque, Portrait of Pradier (1848)

James Pradier (born Jean-Jacques Pradier, pronounced [pʁadje]; 23 May 1790 – 4 June 1852) was a Genevan-born French sculptor best known for his work in the neoclassical style.

== Life and work ==
Born in Geneva (then the Republic of Geneva), Pradier was the son of a Protestant family from Toulouse. He left for Paris in 1807 to work with his elder brother, Charles-Simon Pradier, an engraver, and also attended the École des Beaux-Arts beginning in 1808. He won a Prix de Rome that enabled him to study in Rome from 1814 to 1818 at the Villa Medici. Pradier made his debut at the Salon of 1819 and quickly acquired a reputation as a competent artist. He studied under Jean-Auguste-Dominique Ingres in Paris. In 1827 he became a member of the Académie des beaux-arts and a professor at the École des Beaux-Arts

Unlike many of his contemporaries, Pradier oversaw the finishing of his sculptures himself. He was a friend of the Romantic poets Alfred de Musset, Victor Hugo, Théophile Gautier, and the young Gustave Flaubert. His workshop was a meeting place for artists, presided over by his mistress, Juliette Drouet, who became Victor Hugo's mistress in 1833. After the liaison with Drouet ended, Pradier married Louise d'Arcet (1814–1885), daughter of the French chemist Jean-Pierre-Joseph d'Arcet, in 1833. They separated in 1845, after Pradier had become aware of her infidelities. They had three children: Charlotte (born 27 July 1834), John (b. 21 May 1836), and Thérèse (b. 3 July 1839). Due to her numerous lovers and her complicated financial life, Louise Pradier was among the inspirations for Flaubert when he wrote Madame Bovary.

The cool neoclassical surface finish of Pradier's sculptures is charged with an eroticism that their mythological themes can barely disguise. At the Salon of 1834, Pradier's Satyr and Bacchante created a scandalous sensation. Some claimed to recognize the features of the sculptor and his mistress, Juliette Drouet. When the prudish government of Louis-Philippe refused to purchase it, Count (later Prince) Anatoly Nikolaievich Demidov bought it and took it to his palazzo in Florence – though many years later it would finally be on display in France, part of the Louvre's collection.

Many other sculptures by Pradier are all situated in prominent locations of Paris. At the northeast corner of Place de la Concorde the allegories of the cities of Lille and Strasbourg were made by him (c. 1835–1838), the four figures of Fame in the spandrels of the Arc de Triomphe, the Marriage of the Virgin at the Madeleine (1840), and two allegories of drama from his hand, la Comédie sérieuse and the Comédie légère (1844), complete the Fontaine Molière by architect Louis Visconti and the writer's portrait in bronze by Bernard-Gabriel Seurre. as is the Prometheus Enchained for the Tuileries Garden, now displayed in the Louvre. His last accomplished work became the twelve individually designed Victories (begun ca. 1843 until his death) grouped around the sarcophagus of Napoleon in the crypt of the Invalides, representing twelve individual battles the emperor won.

For his native Geneva he completed the statue of the Genevan Jean-Jacques Rousseau erected in 1838 on the tiny Île Rousseau, where Lac Léman empties to form the Rhône. Aside from large-scale sculptures, Pradier collaborated with François-Désiré Froment-Meurice, designing jewelry in a 'Renaissance-Romantic' style.

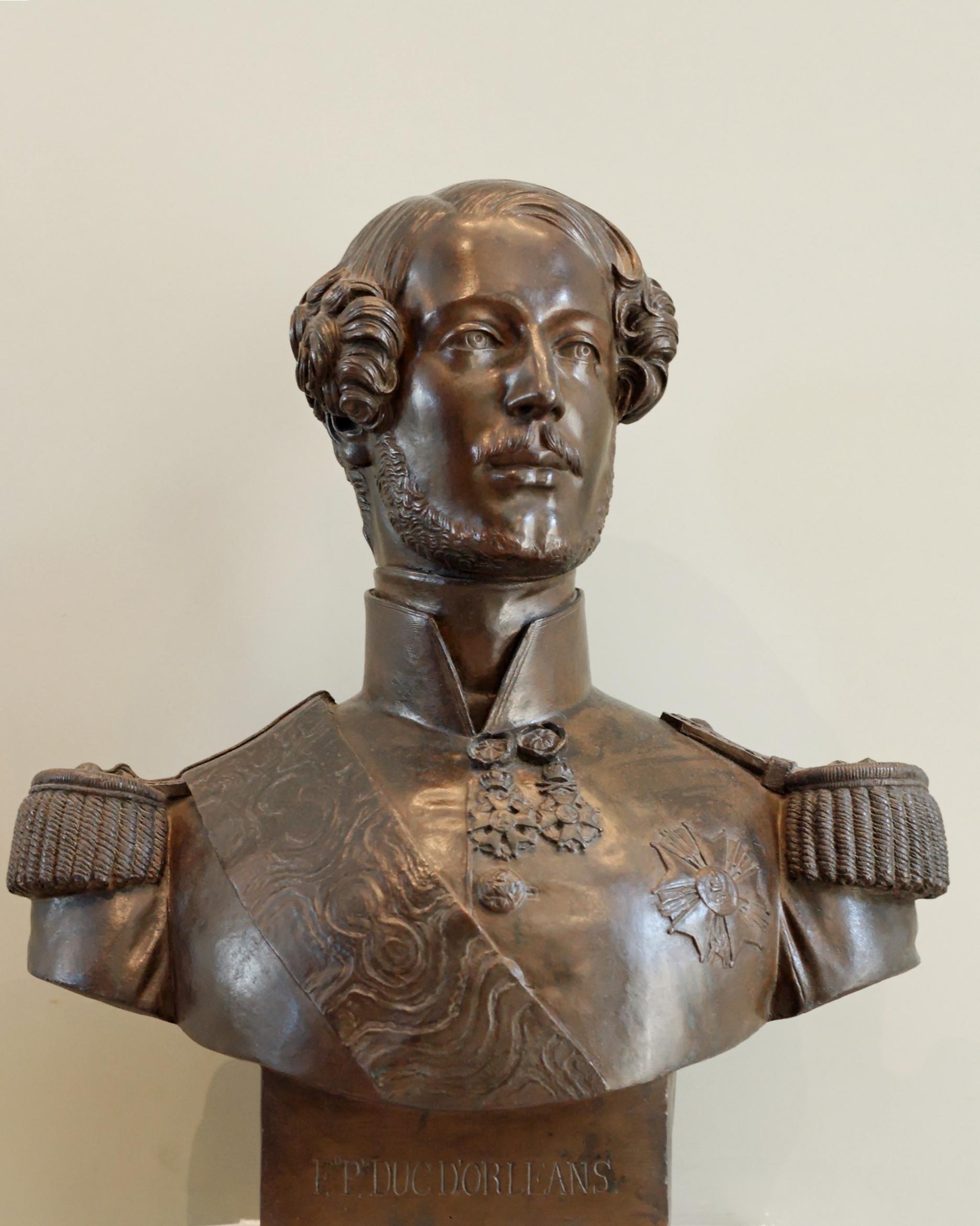
Memorial bust of the duc d'Orléans, bronze (1842), Louvre

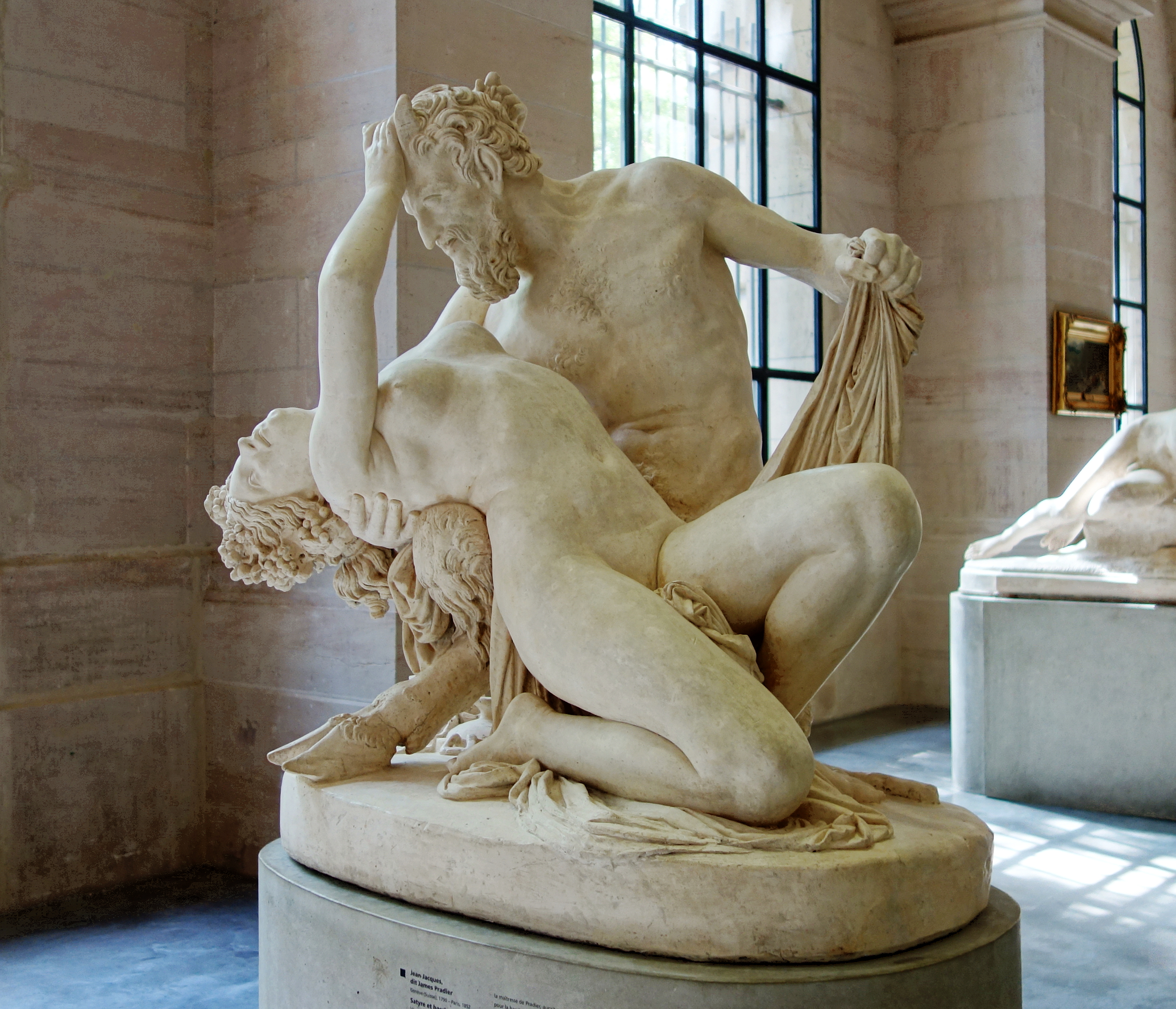
Satyr and Bacchante, plaster (1834), Palais des Beaux-Arts de Lille

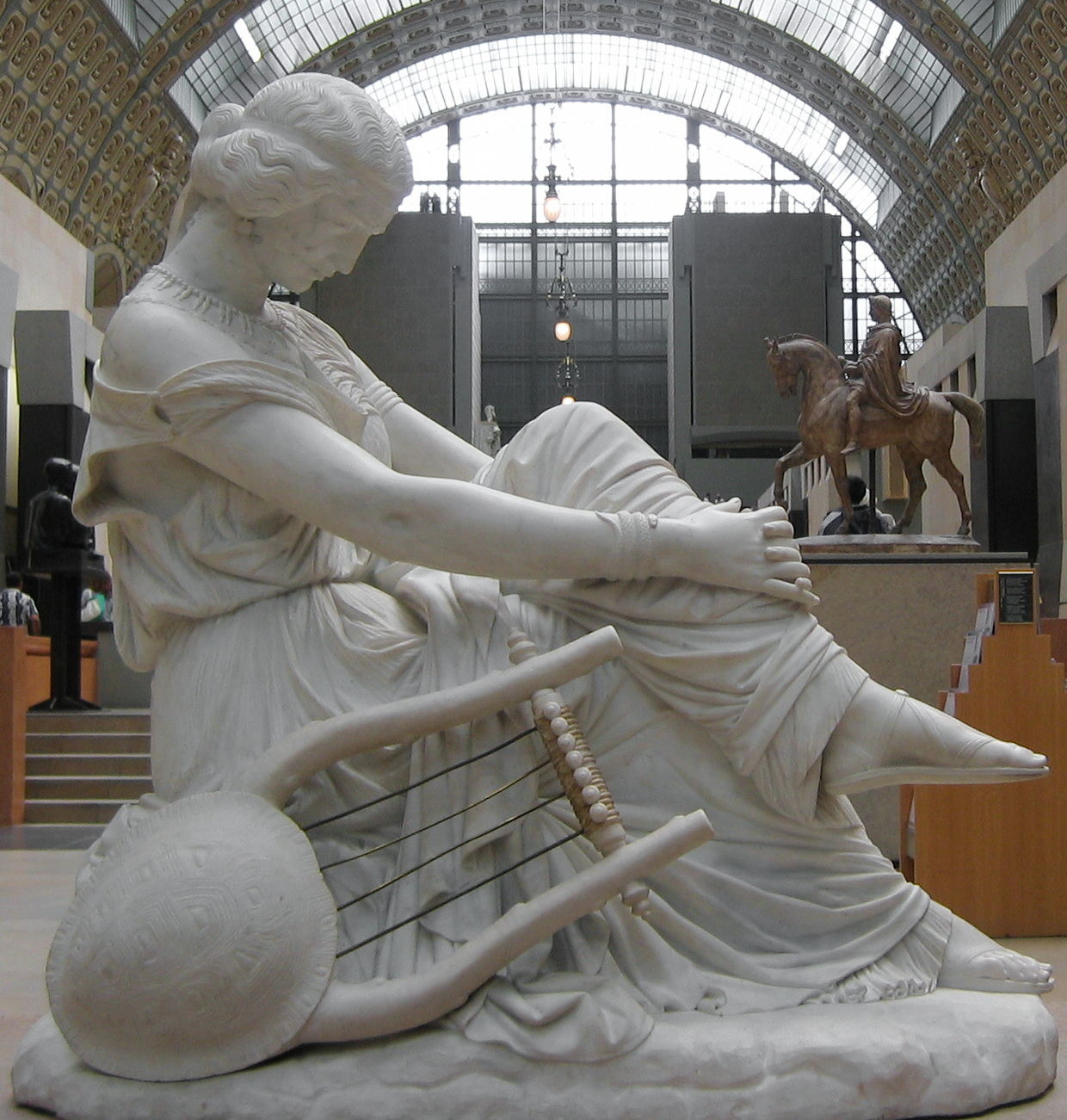
Sapho (1852), Musée d'Orsay (RF 2990)

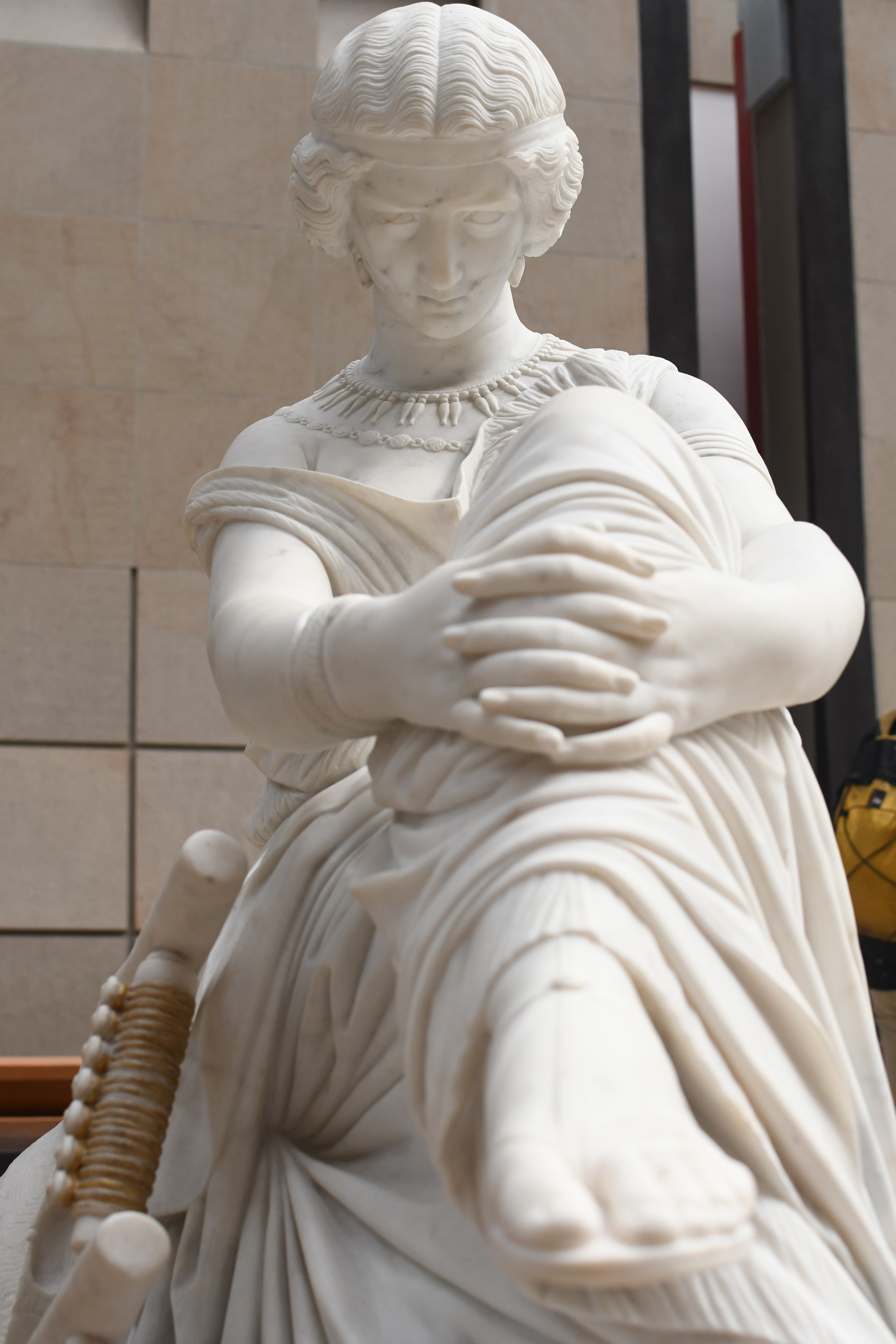
Sapho en face, contemplating suicide

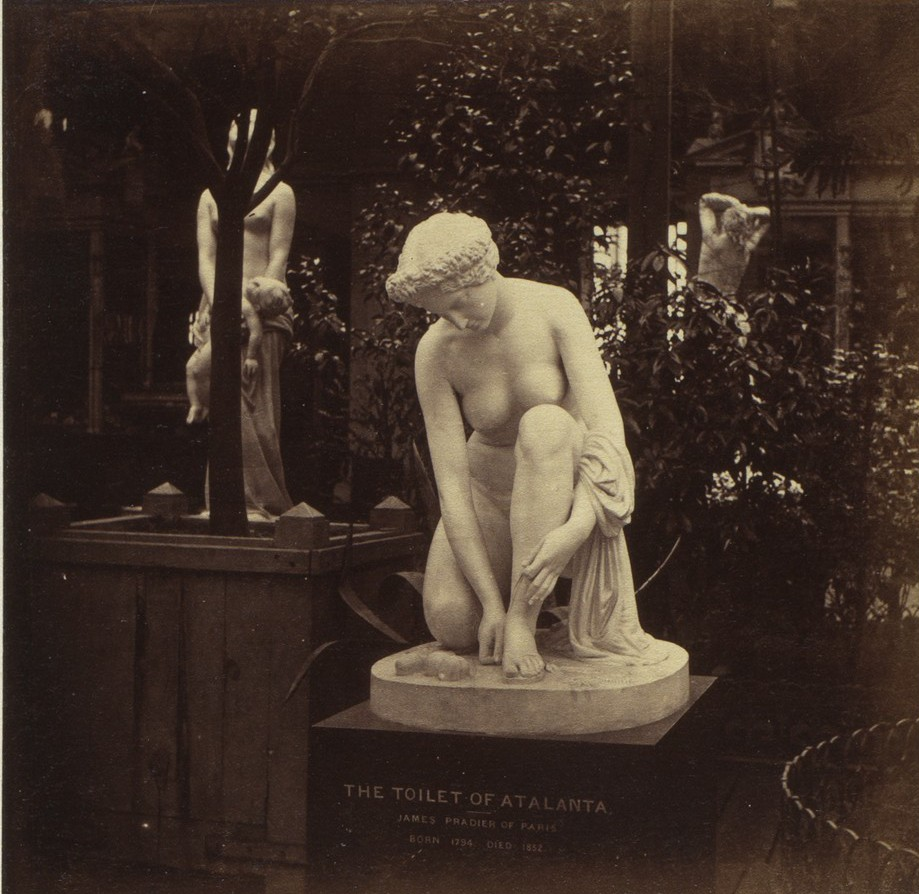
The Toilet of Atalanta (1850), Louvre (photographed ca. 1859 by Philip Henry Delamotte at the Crystal Palace, London)

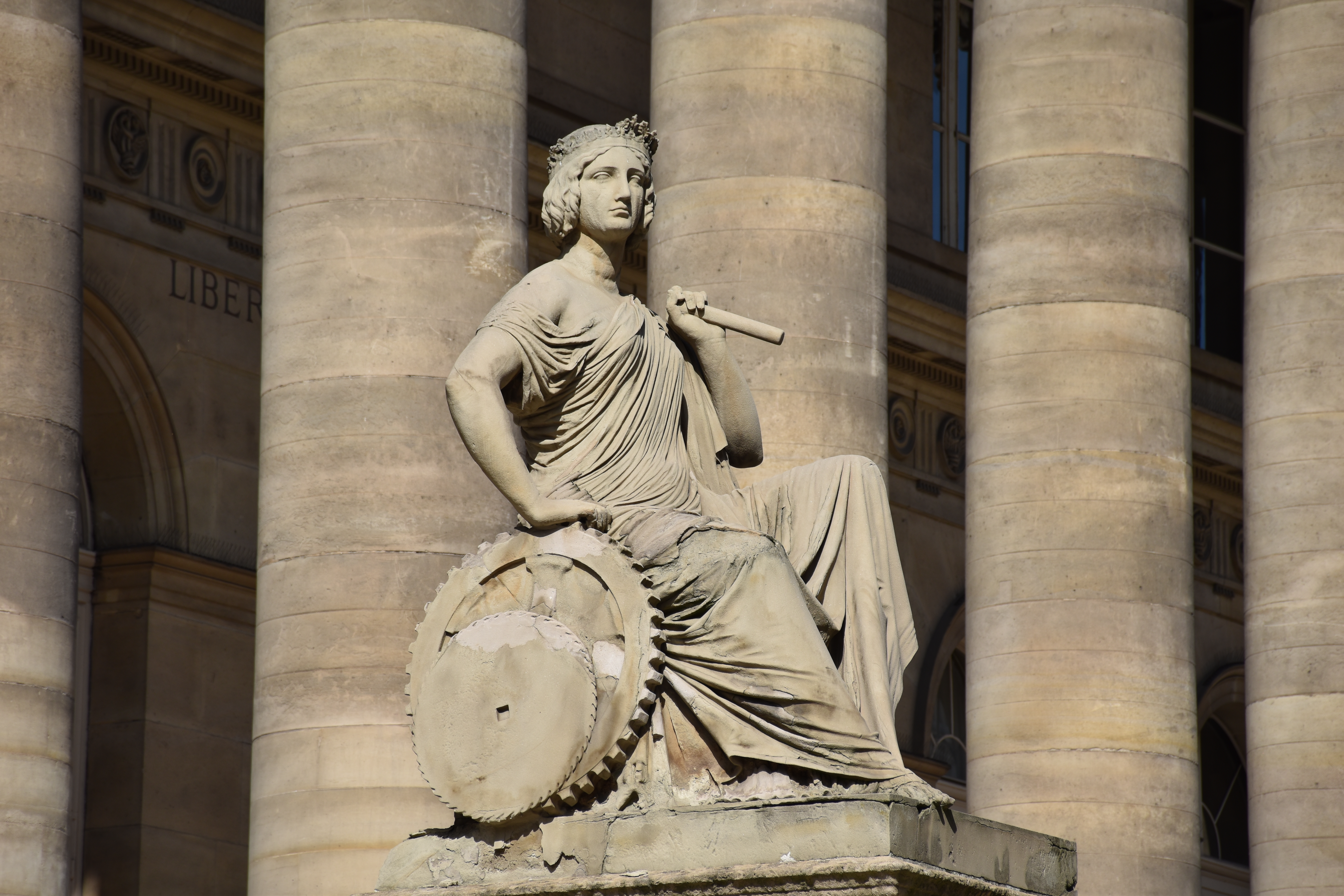
The Allegorical figure of Industry (1851), Palais Brongniart, Paris

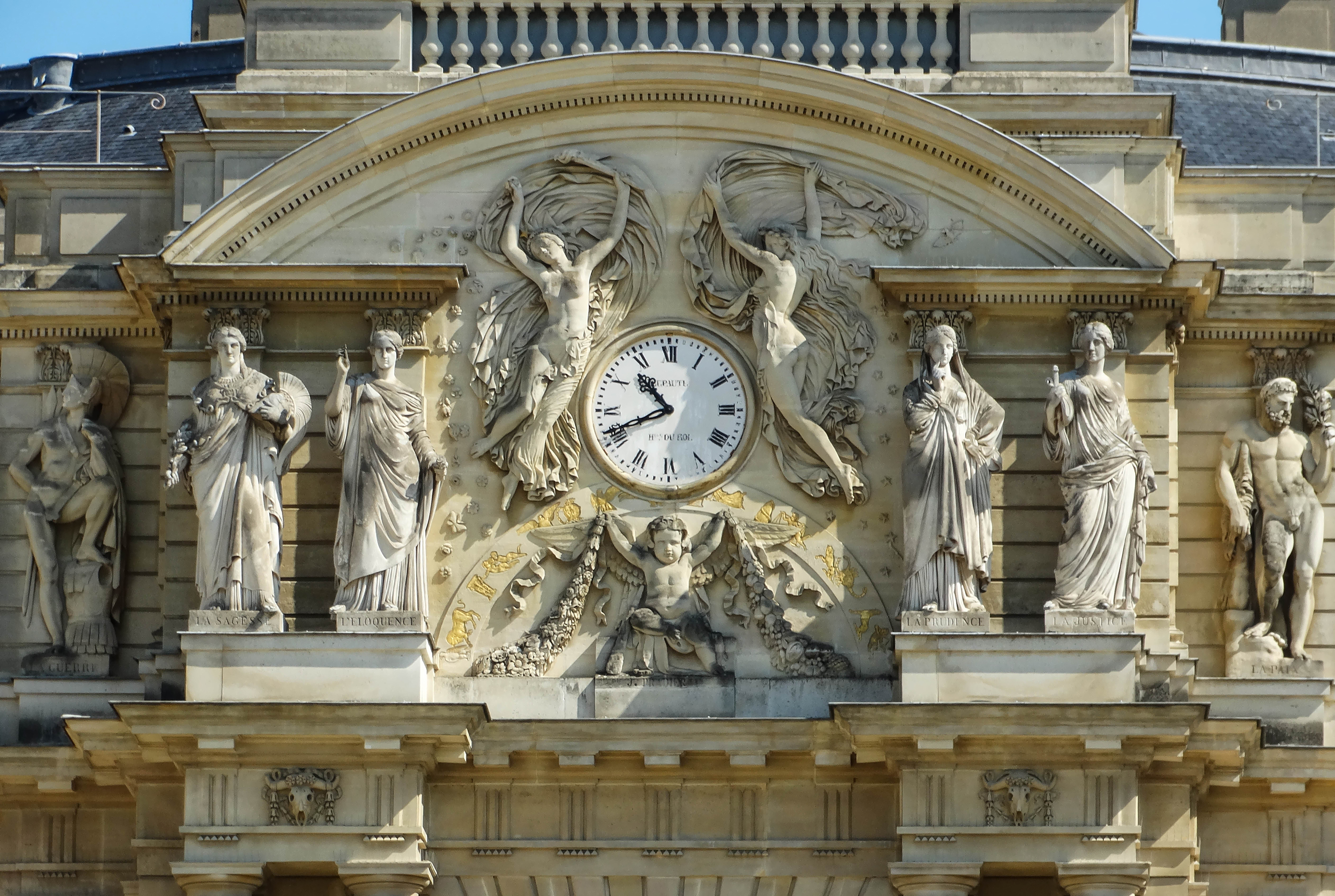
Allegorical statues flanking the clock of Palais du Luxembourg

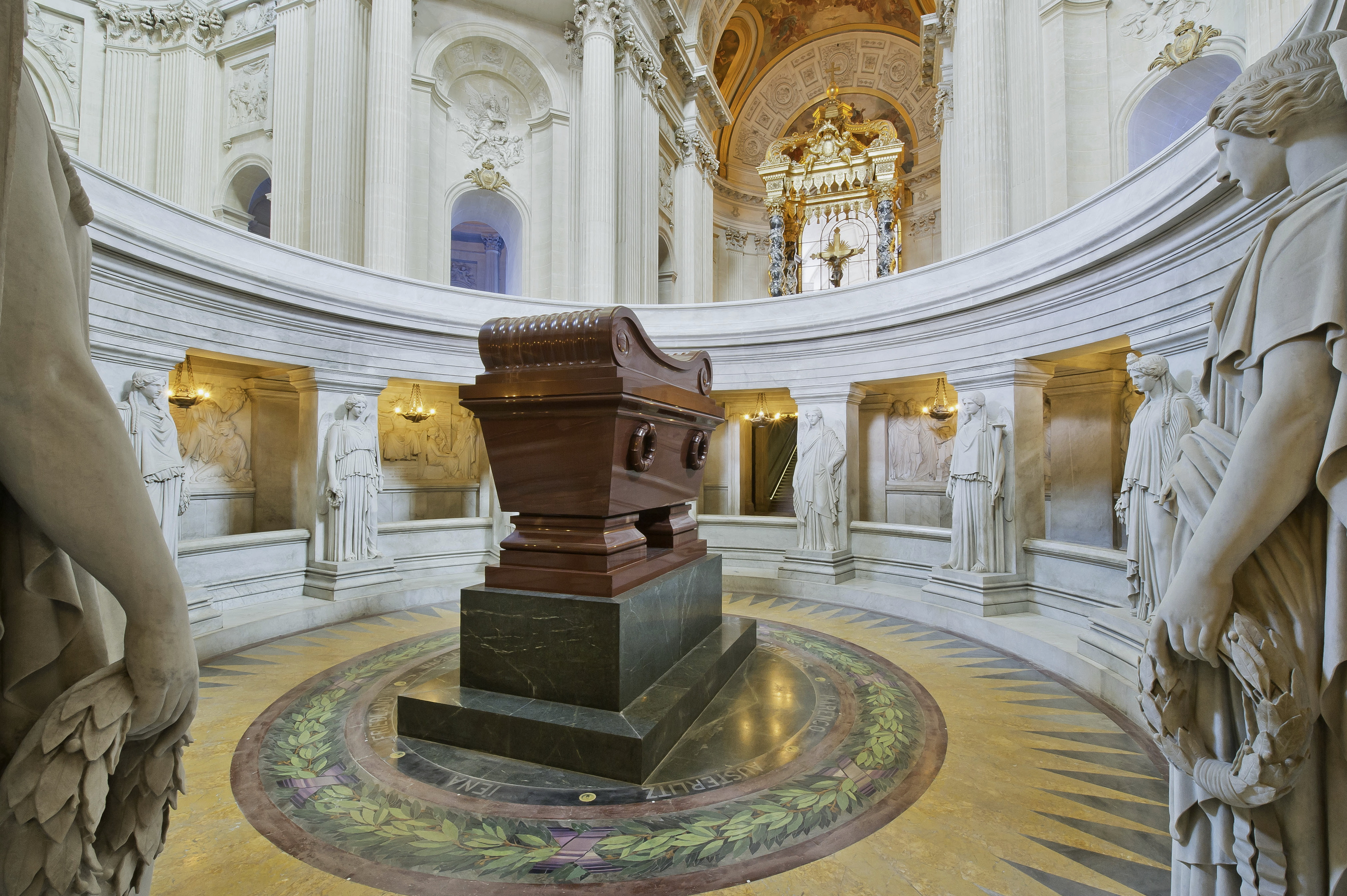
Twelve Victories (1844–1853) surrounding Napoleon's tomb, Dome of Les Invalides

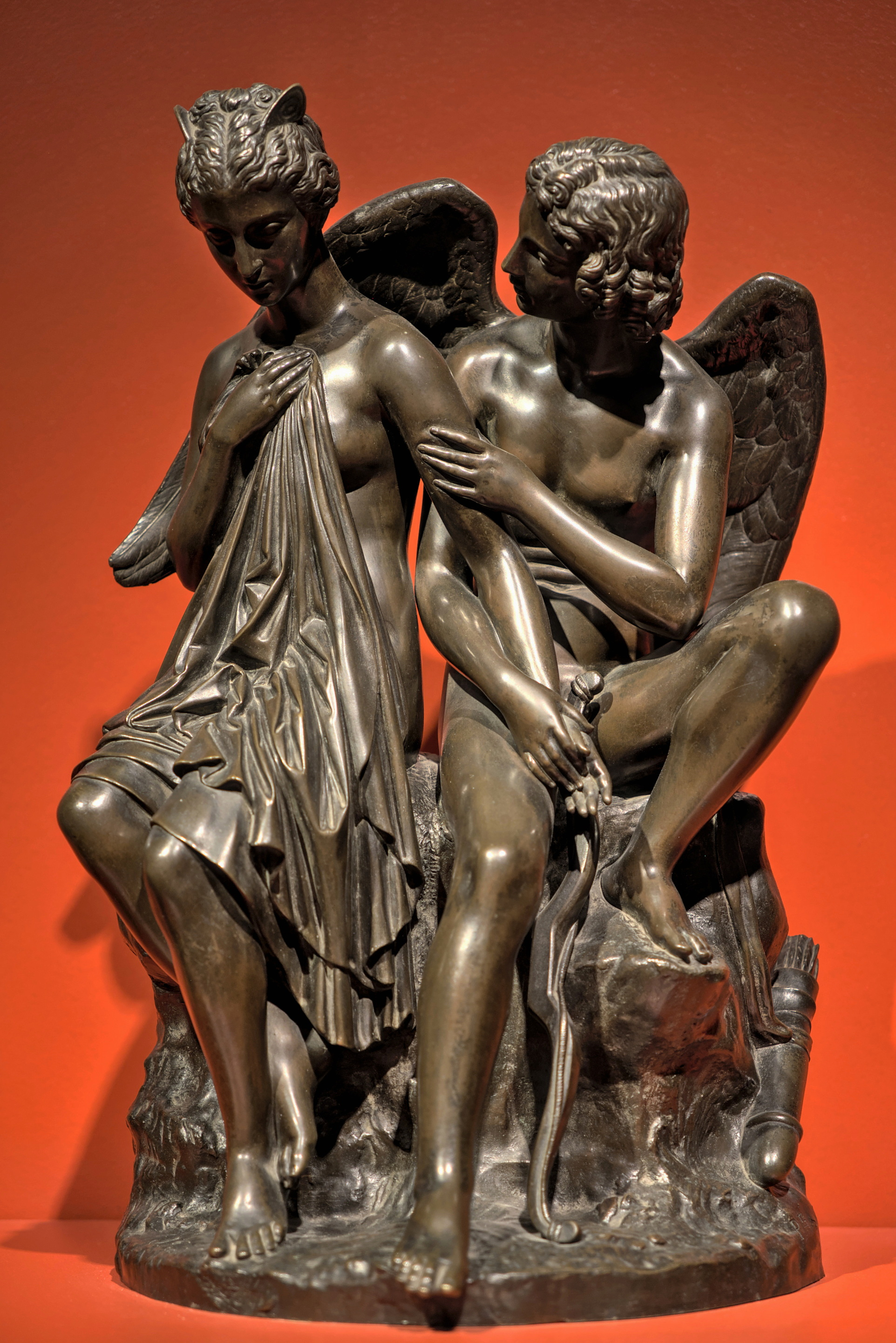
Amor and Psyche, bronze statuette (1850), Municipal Museum of Bourg-en-Bresse

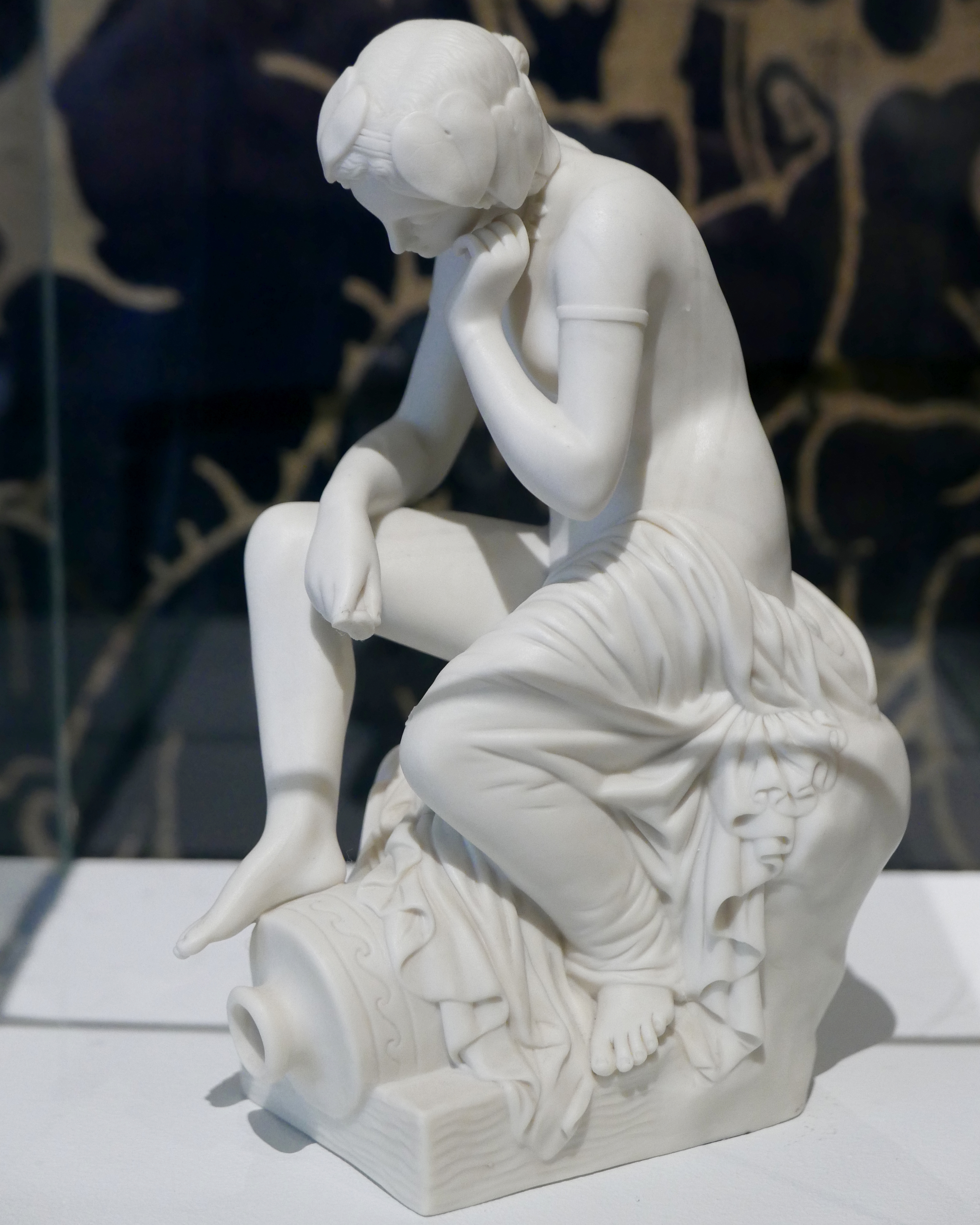
Nemausa (lat. for Nîmes), porcelain figurine (ca. 1851), Musée du Vieux Nîmes

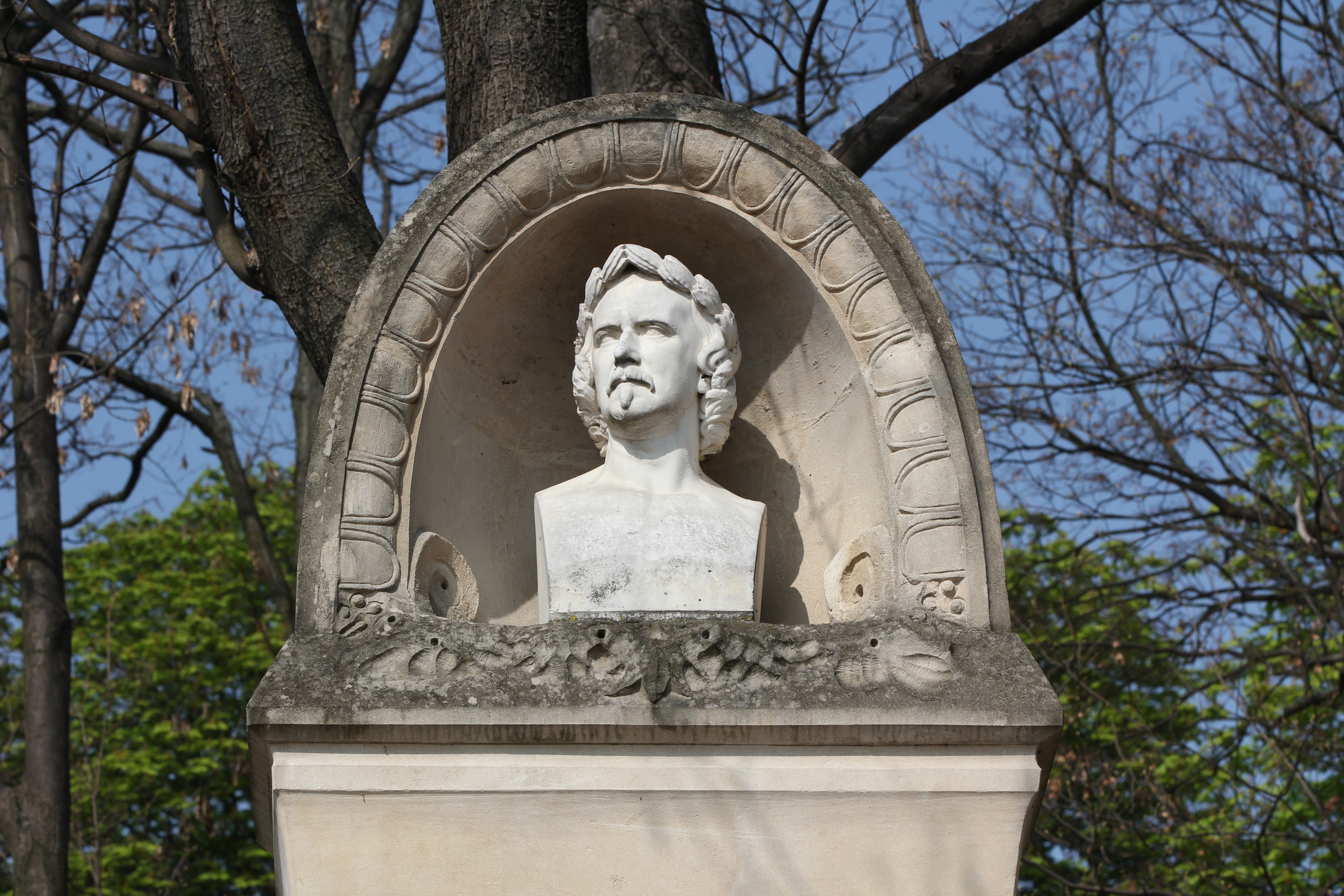
Bust of Pradier on his tombstone by Eugène-Louis Lequesne

James Pradier is buried in the Père-Lachaise cemetery. Much of the contents of his studio were bought after his death by the city museum of Geneva.

== Influence ==
Pradier's importance as an artist in his day is demonstrated by the fact that his portrait is included in François Joseph Heim's painting Charles X Distributing Prizes to Artists at the Salon of 1824, now in the Louvre Museum, Paris.

Pradier has been largely forgotten in modern times. In 1846 Gustave Flaubert said of him, however:

This is a great artist, a true Greek, the most antique of all the moderns; a man who is distracted by nothing, not by politics, nor socialism, and who, like a true workman, sleeves rolled up, is there to do his task from morning until night with the will to do well and the love of his art.

An exhibition, Statues de chair: sculptures de James Pradier (1790–1852) at Geneva's Musée d'Art et d'Histoire (October 1985 – February 1986) and Paris, Musée du Luxembourg (February – May 1986), roused some interest in Pradier's career and aesthetic.

Pradier's students included:

- Marie-Noémi Cadiot, 1828–1888
- Henri Chapu, 1833–1891
- Gustave Crauck, 1827–1905
- Antoine Étex, 1808–1888
- Eugène Guillaume, 1822–1905
- Henri Lehmann, 1814–1882
- Eugène-Louis Lequesne, 1815–1887
- Henri Le Secq, 1818–1882
- Jacques-Léonard Maillet, 1823–1894
- Pierre-Charles Simart, 1806–1857

== Bibliography ==
- Fusco, Peter and H. W. Janson (eds.). The Romantics to Rodin. Exhibtion catalogue, Los Angeles County Museum of Art, Los Angeles 1980.
- Hargrove, June. The Statues of Paris: An Open-Air Pantheon – The Histories of Statues of Famous Men. Vendome, New York 1989.
- Mackay, James. The Dictionary of Sculptors in Bronze. Antique Collectors Club, Woodbridge (Suffolk) 1977.
- Van Nimmen, Jane and Ruth Mirolli (eds.). Nineteenth Century French Sculpture: Monuments for the Middle Class. Exhibtion catalogue, Speed Art Museum, Louisville (Kentucky) 1971.

== See also ==
- List of works by James Pradier
