= Jean-Eugène Dezeimeris =

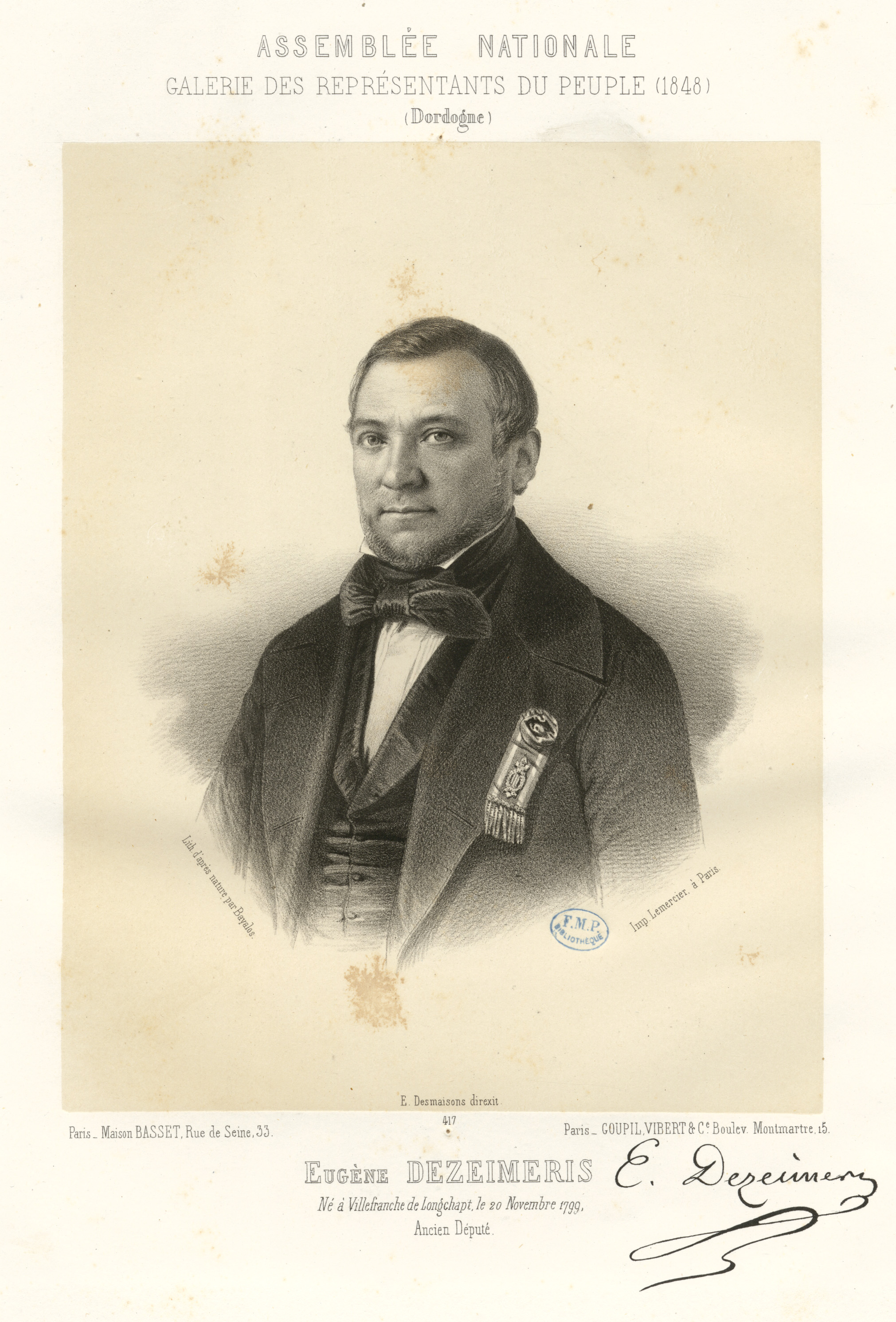
Jean-Eugène Dezeimeris

Jean-Eugène Dezeimeris (20 November 1799, Villefranche-de-Lonchat – 16 February 1852, Paris) was a French librarian and historian of medicine.

He studied medicine in Bordeaux and Paris. In 1819 he quit these studies in order to conduct research of medicine from a historical standpoint. After several years of research, he published his magnum opus, "Dictionnaire historique de la médecine, ancienne et moderne" (1828–). Eventually, he obtained his doctorate with the thesis "Quelques réflexions sur l'histoire de la médecine" (Some reflections on the history of medicine; 1832).

In 1830 he became an assistant librarian at the Faculty of Medicine in Paris, where in 1836, he was appointed chief librarian, a post he maintained until his death in 1852. He was also interested in agricultural economics and published a number of treatises on the subject. From 1842 to 1846 and in 1848/49 he represented the department of Dordogne in the Assemblée nationale (French National Assembly).

== Published works ==
From 1837 to 1843, with Émile Littré, he was editor of the periodical "L'Expérience : journal de médecine et de chirurgie". The following are a few of Dezeimeris' noteworthy written works:

- Dictionnaire historique de la médecine, ancienne et moderne (4 tomes in 7 volumes) 1828-39, (in collaboration with Jacques Raige-Delorme; Charles-Prosper Ollivier d'Angers) – Historical dictionary of ancient and modern medicine.
- Lettres sur l'histoire de la médecine : et sur la nécessité de l'enseignement de cette histoire, suivies de fragmens historiques, 1838 – Letters on the history of medicine, etc.
- Resumé de la médecine hippocratique; ou, Aphorismes d'Hippocrates, 1843 – Summary of Hippocratic medicine, or aphorisms of Hippocrates.
- Conseils aux agriculteurs sur l'art d'expoiter le sol avec profit et au gouvernement sur les moyens de relever notre agriculture, ou mélanges d'économie rurale et d'économie politique agricole, 1850.

He also made contributions to Nicolas-Philibert Adelon's "Dictionnaire de médecine, ou, répertoire général des sciences médicales".
