= Philippe Chaslin =

French Psychiatrist

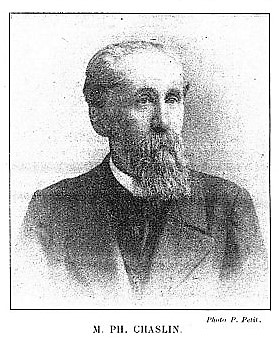
- Born: 14 February 1857 Paris, France
- Died: 26 July 1923 (aged 66) Paris, France
- Occupation: Physician, Psychiatrist

Philippe Chaslin (14 February 1857 - 26 July 1923) was a French Psychiatrist who in the language of the time was referred to as an alienist.

He was born in Paris. He initially demonstrated a strong interest in mathematics. His Maternal grandfather Jacques Raige-Delorme was a physician and librarian of the Faculty of Medicine of Paris and was instrumental in the publication of Dictionnaire encyclopédique des sciences médicales. It is believed it is through Reige-Delorme influence he became interested in Medicine. He was a medical resident by the age of 25 and trained as a psychiatrist under Luys Voisin and Fere. By 32 was the Chief Physician at Bicêtre Hospital. From 1910 he was director of a service at the Pitié-Salpêtrière Hospital until1921. He never married and was described as being of short stature with frail health.

He demonstrated that there is widespread Gliosis in the brains of people with Epilepsy. In 1895 in La Confusion Mentale Primitive: Stupidite, Demence Aigue, Stupeur Primitive (1895) he described Delirium as a separate entity to other forms of cognitive impairment or developmental disorders.

Despite his significant contributions to descriptive psychopathology he is not well known amongst anglophone psychiatrists. Éléments de sémiologie et clinique mentales is considered hjis most important work and took 25 years to write and included 350 clinical cases. It is focussed on descriptive psychopathology with a focus on theory free descriptions rather than looking to establish underlying aetiology. It was published before Karl Jaspers famous work General Psychopathology (German Allgemeine Psychopathologie) which went onto become the text with German speaking and English speaking psychiatrists.

== Selected Published works ==
In his lifetime he published 3 books and around 43 articles.

- “La psychiatrie est-elle une langue bien faite?” (Is Psychiatry a well made language?), published in Revue neurologique. He provides a critique of terminology and Nosology in psychiatry.
- La Confusion mentale primitive (Primitive mental confusion), Paris, Asselin et Houzeau, 1895, part I, Chap. 1, “Symptomatologie de la confusion mentale primitive et idiopathique” (Symptomatology of primitive and idiopathic mental confusion).
- Éléments de sémiologie et clinique mentales (Elements of a semiology and a clinical approach to mental disease), Paris, Asselin et Houzeau, 1912, 956 pages.
