= Fontaine Molière =

Fountain in Paris, France

Coordinates: 48.86554°N 2.33667°E

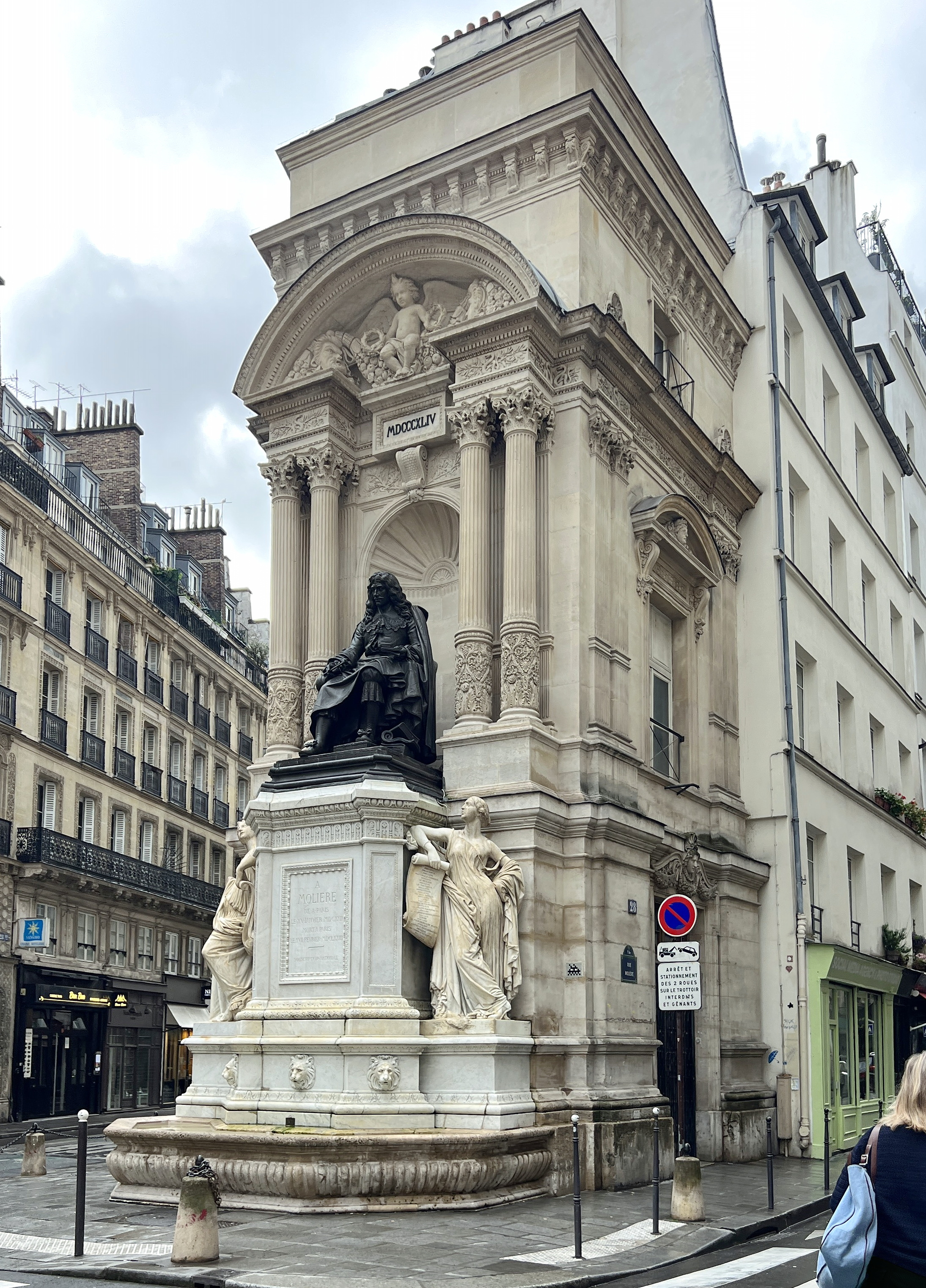
The Fontaine Molière

The Fontaine Molière is a fountain in the 1st arrondissement of Paris, at the junction of the Rue Molière and the Rue de Richelieu.

Its site was occupied by a fountain known as the Fontaine Richelieu until 1838, when it was demolished due to interfering with traffic flow. Joseph Régnier, a member of the Comédie-Française, suggested a new fountain set back slightly from the previous fountain's site as a monument to the playwright Molière. This was France's first national public subscription for a commemorative monument dedicated to a non-military figure. Built in 1844, the fountain was designed by several sculptors, headed by the architect Louis Visconti, who also designed the fountain in the Place Saint-Sulpice.

The main bronze sculpture, showing Molière seated under a portico under an imposing arch, is by Bernard-Gabriel Seurre and cast by the fonderie Eck et Durand. Under him is an inscription flanked by two marble female sculptures by Jean-Jacques Pradier, Serious Comedy and Light Comedy; each holds a scroll listing Molière's works. Right at the bottom are lion masks, from which the water pours into a semi-circular basin. A commemorative medal for the fountain's inauguration was designed by François Augustin Caunois in 1844; an example of it is in the Musée Carnavalet.

== Gallery ==
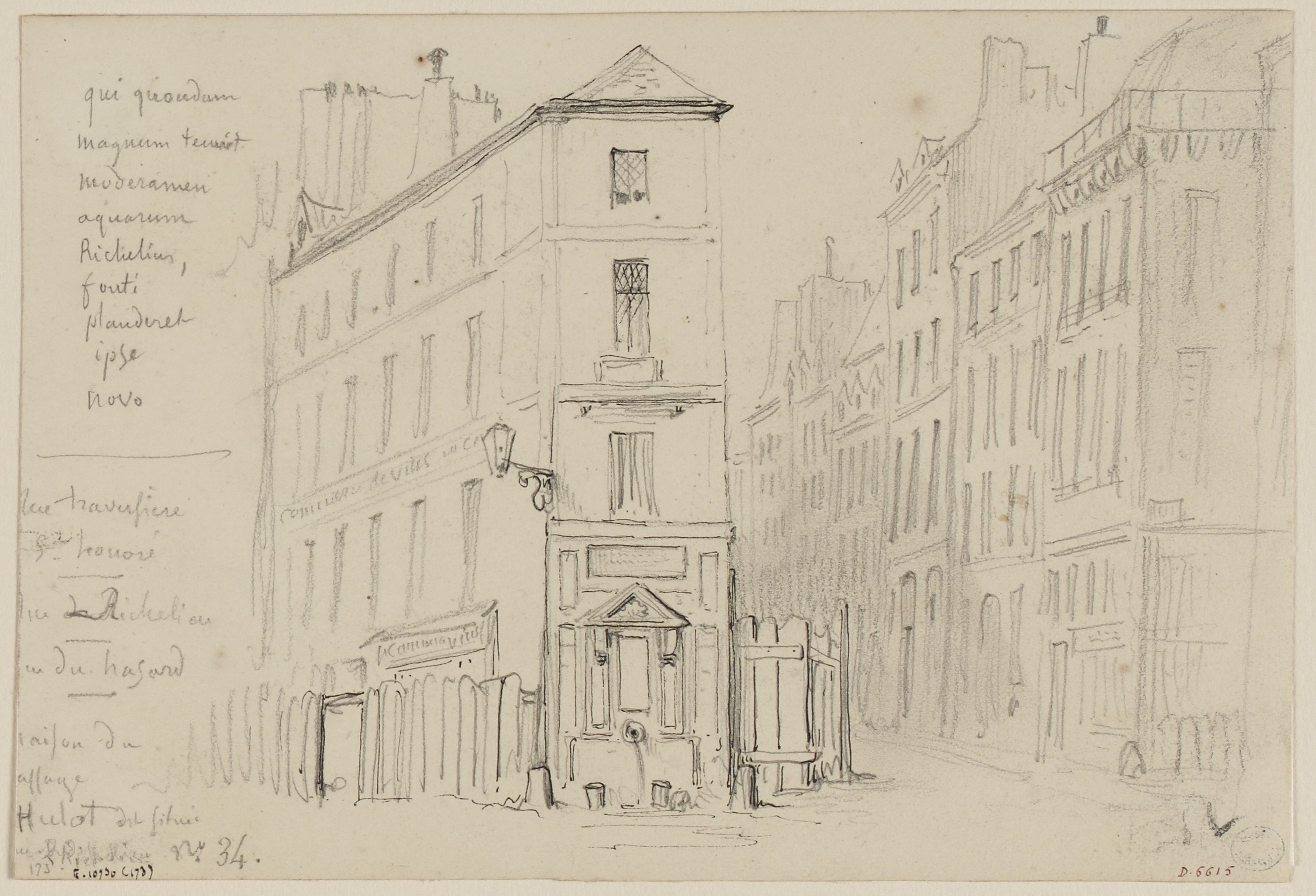
Scetch of the former appearance of the corner with Richelieue fountain

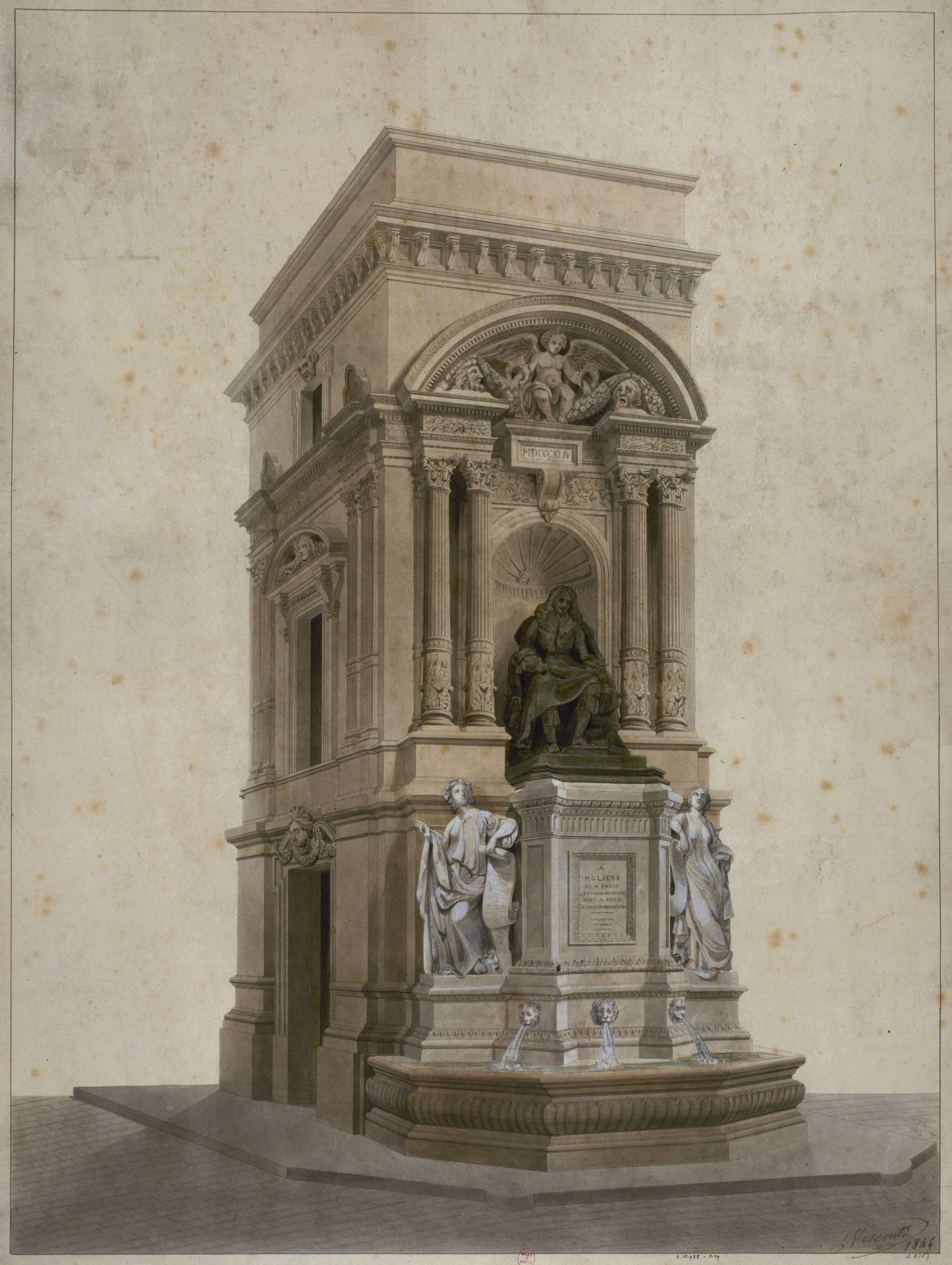
Design by the architect Visconti, 1846

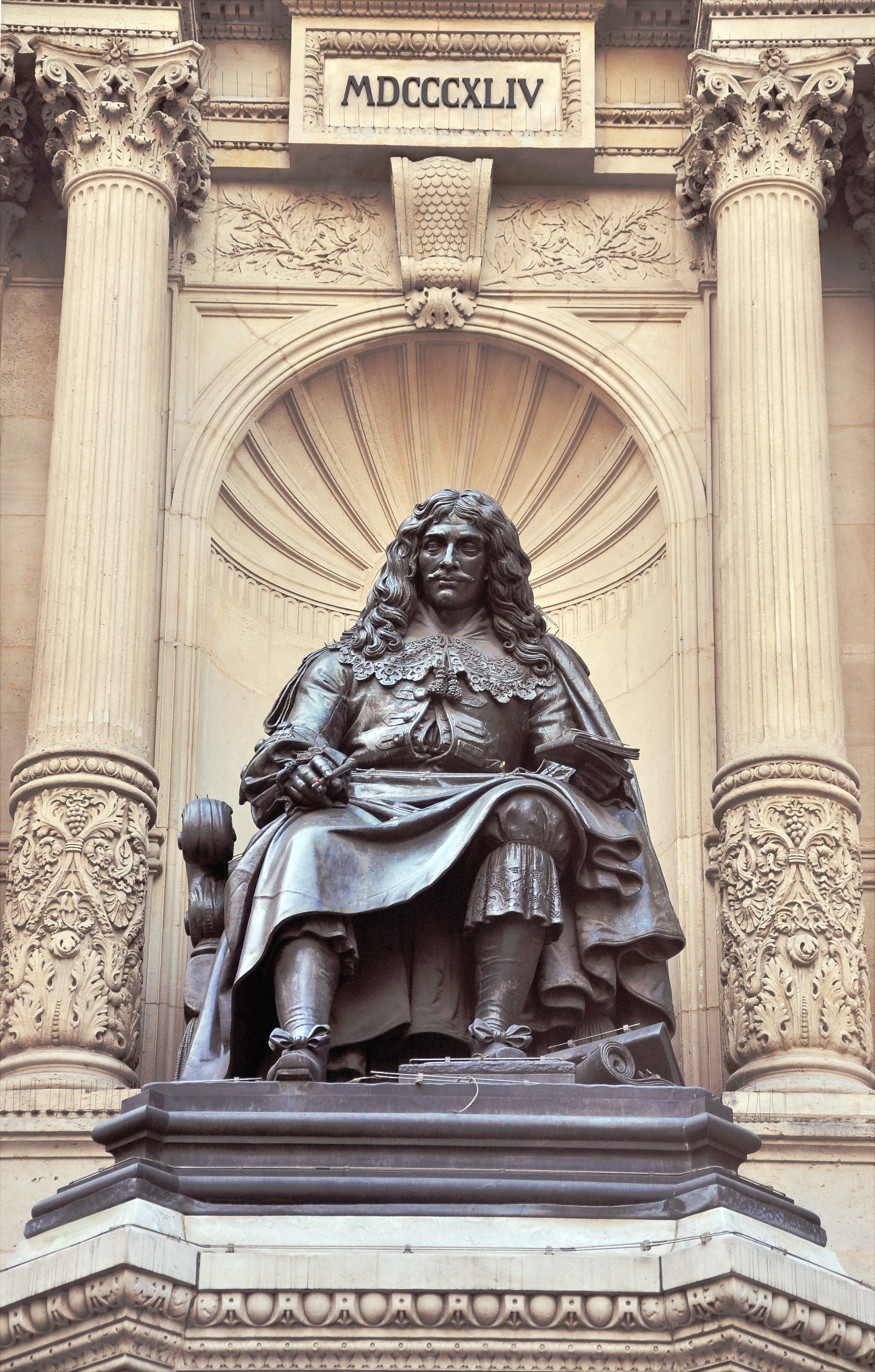
Statue of Molière by Bernard-Gabriel Seurre

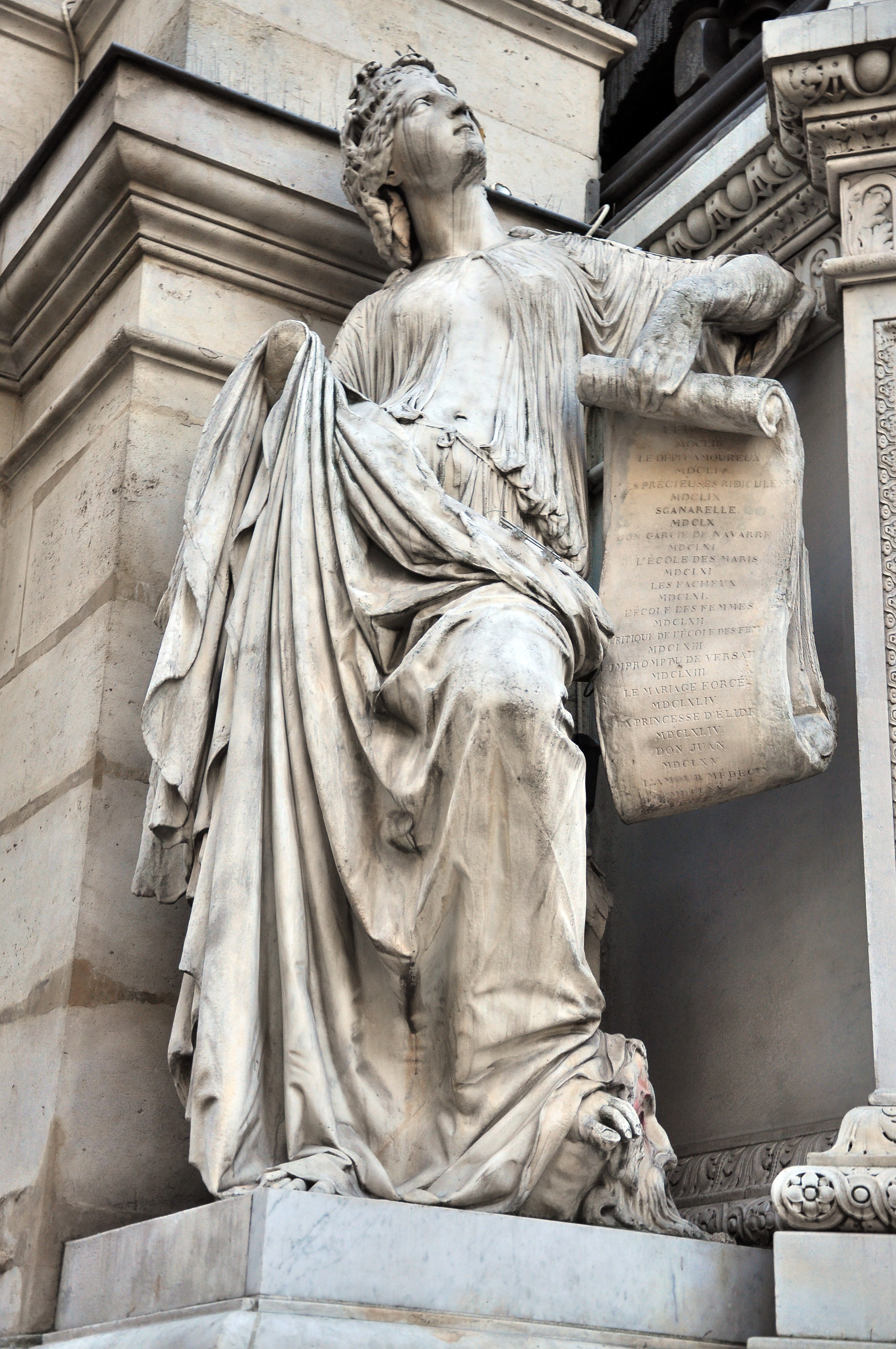
Serious Comedy by Jean-Jacques Pradier

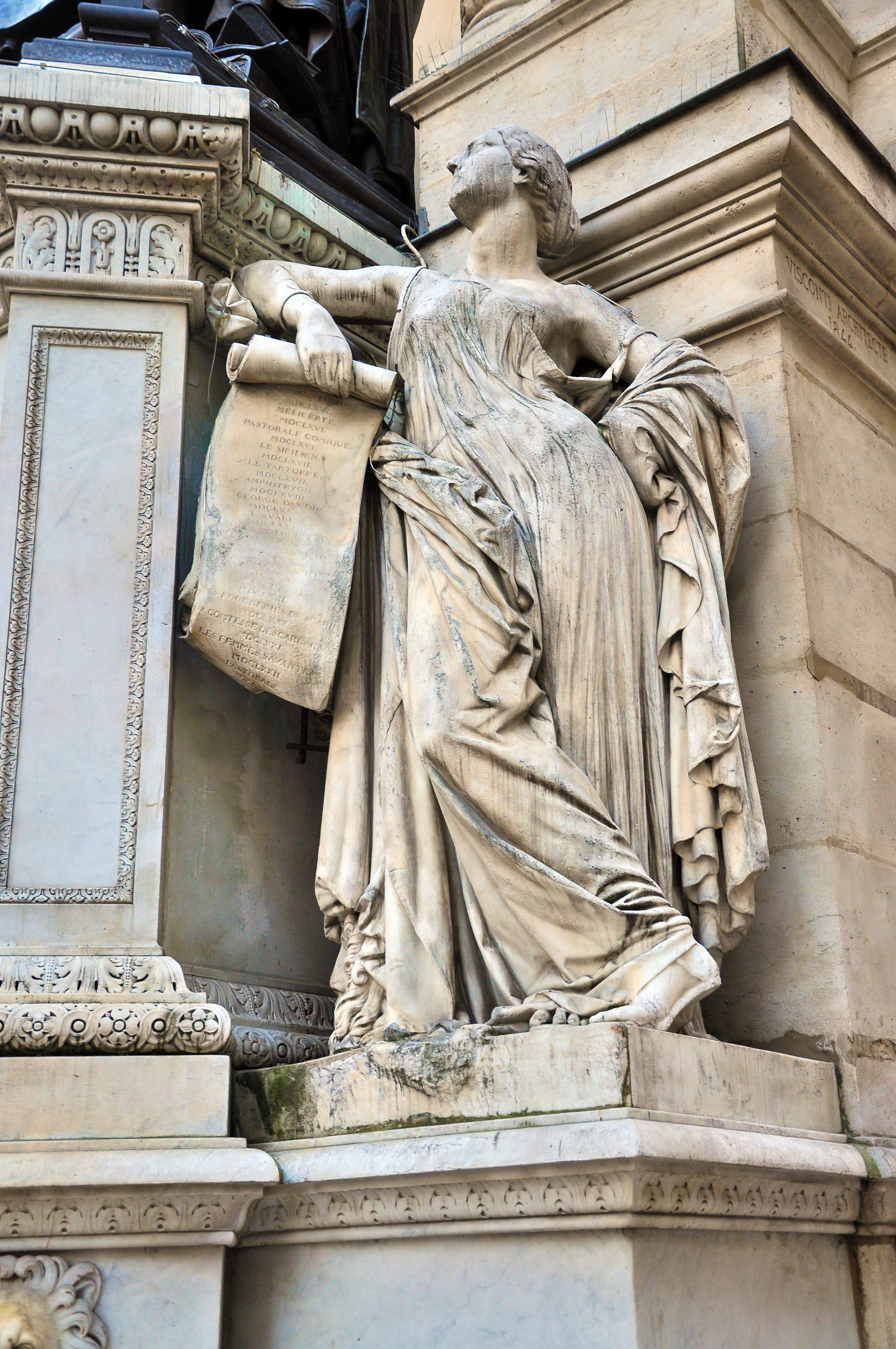
Light Comedy by Jean-Jacques Pradier

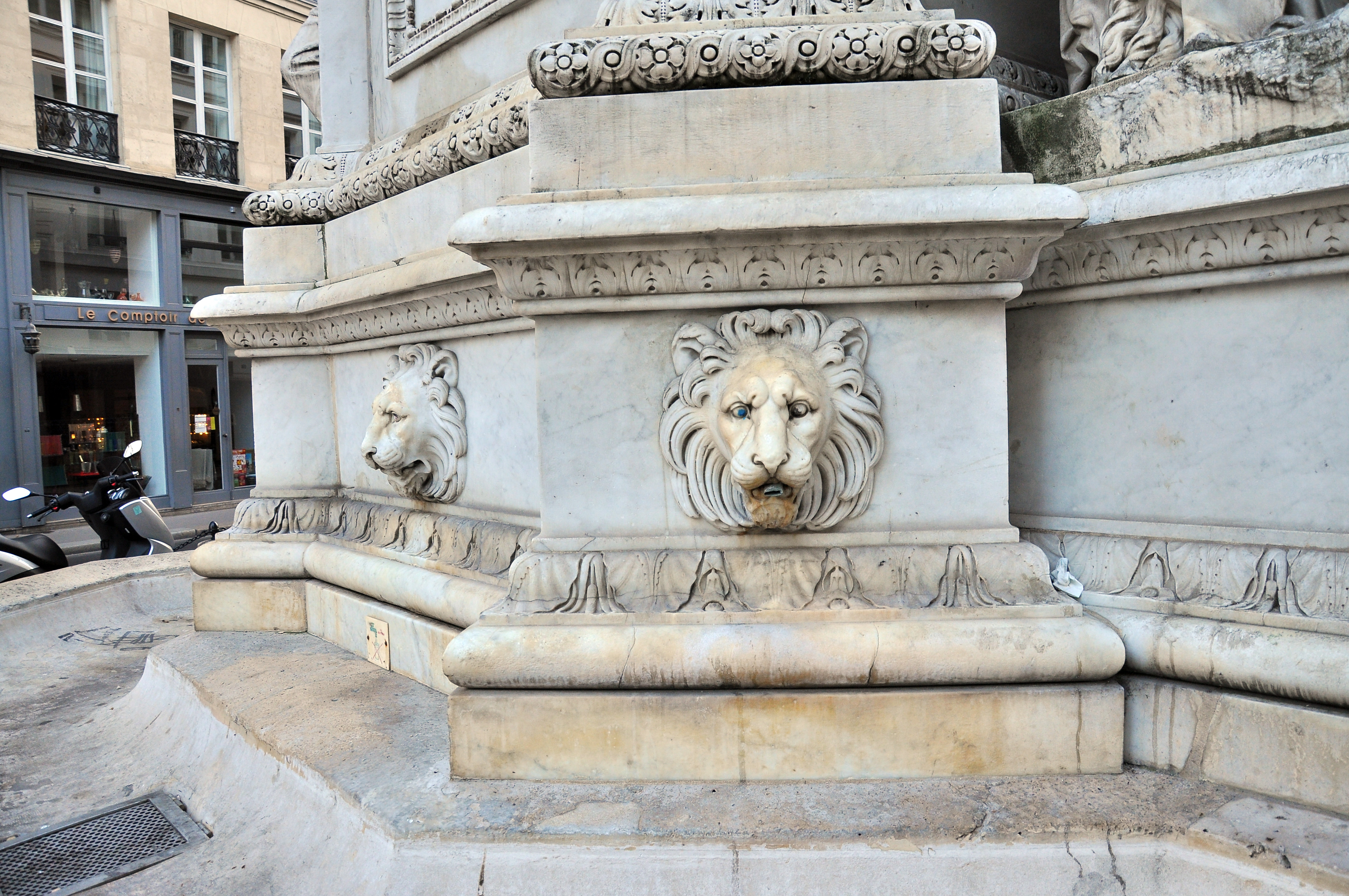
Details of fountain (mascaron)

== See also ==
- List of works by James Pradier Sculpture

== Bibliography ==
- Marie-Hélène Levadé et Hugues Marcouyeau. Les fontaines de Paris: l'eau pour le plaisir. Paris 2008, ISBN 978-2-915345-05-6 (in French).
- Daniel Rabreau. Paris et ses fontaines. Paris 1997, ISBN 978-2-905118-80-6 (in French).
