= Jules-Auguste Béclard =

French physiologist

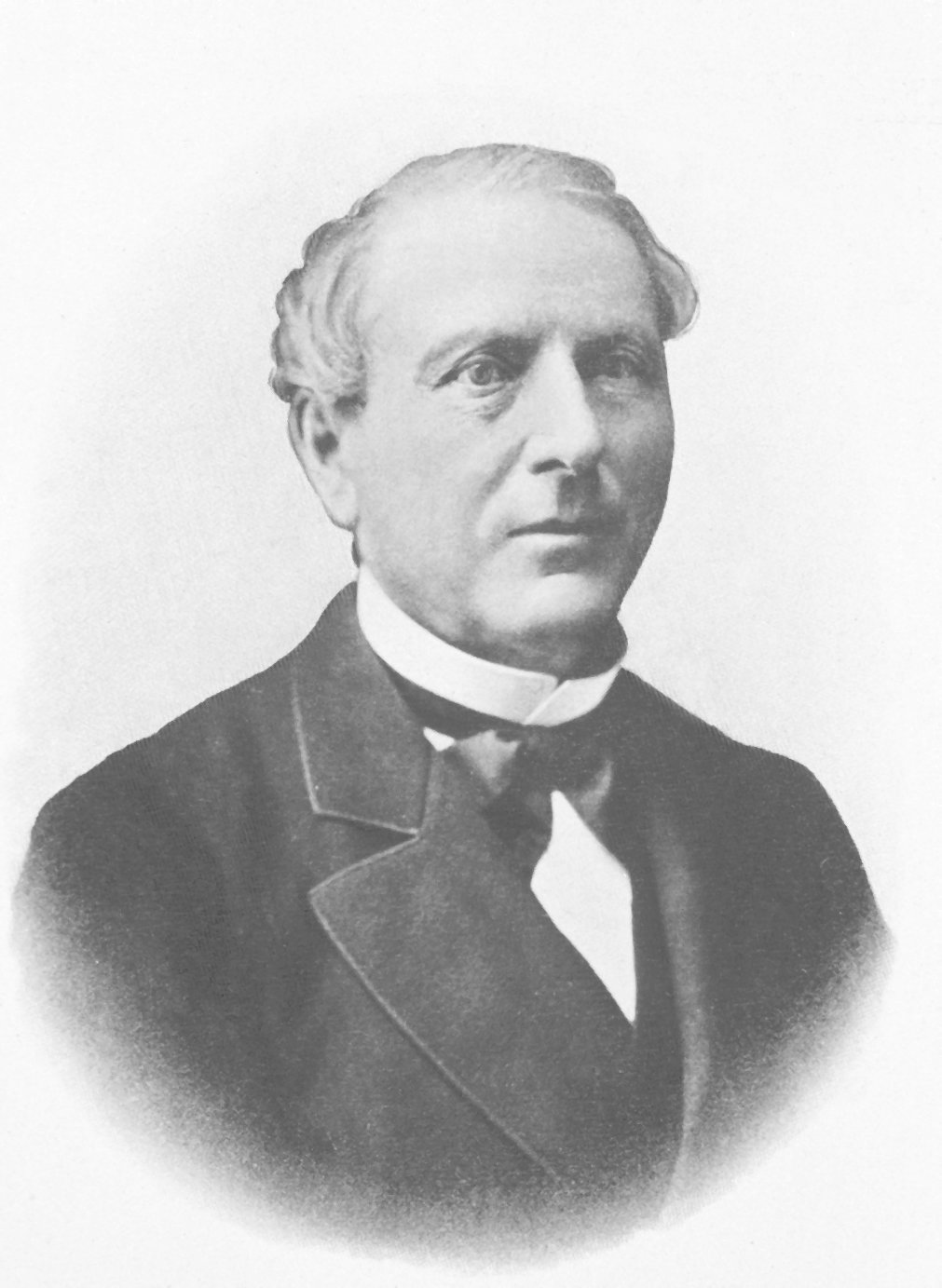
Jules–Auguste Béclard

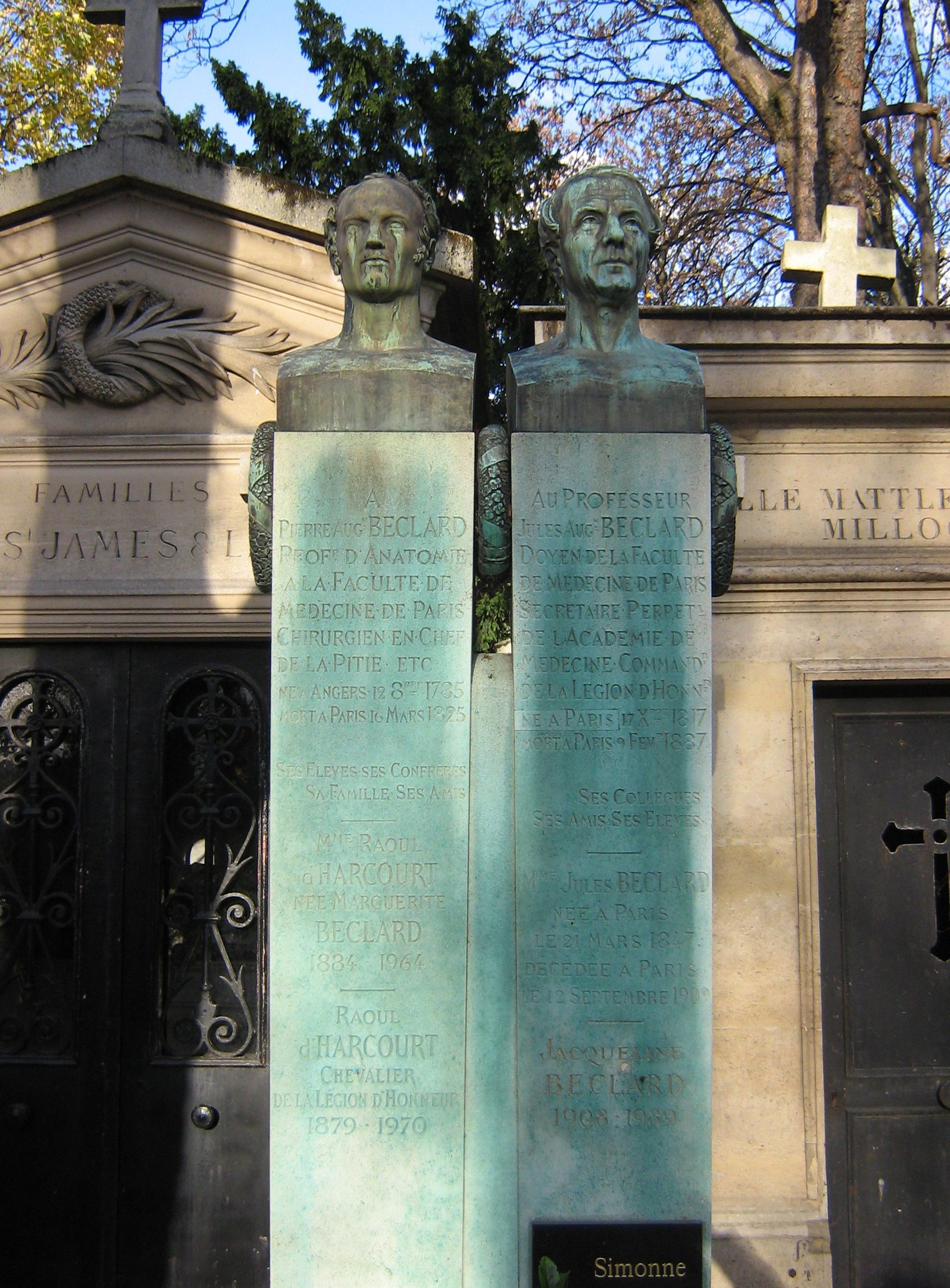
Busts of Jules and Pierre Béclard by sculptor Gustave Crauck, located at Père Lachaise Cemetery in Paris

Jules–Auguste Béclard (17 December 1817 – 9 February 1887) was a French physiologist born in Paris. He was the son of anatomist Pierre Augustin Béclard (1785–1825).

In 1842 he earned his doctorate in Paris, where he later became a professor of physiology to the Faculté de Médecine. From 1862 to 1872 he was secrétaire annuel to the Académie Nationale de Médecine, where from 1873 to 1887 he served as secrétaire perpétuel.

Béclard was the author of a classic work on human physiology called Traité élémentaire de physiologie humaine comprenant les principales notions de la physiologie comparée (1856). Another noted work of his was Contraction musculaire dans ses rapports avec la température animale, a treatise involving correlation of muscular contraction to temperature.

== Bibliography ==
- Amis et Passionnes du Pere Lachaise (translated biography)
