= Charles-Michel Billard =

French physician (1800–1832)

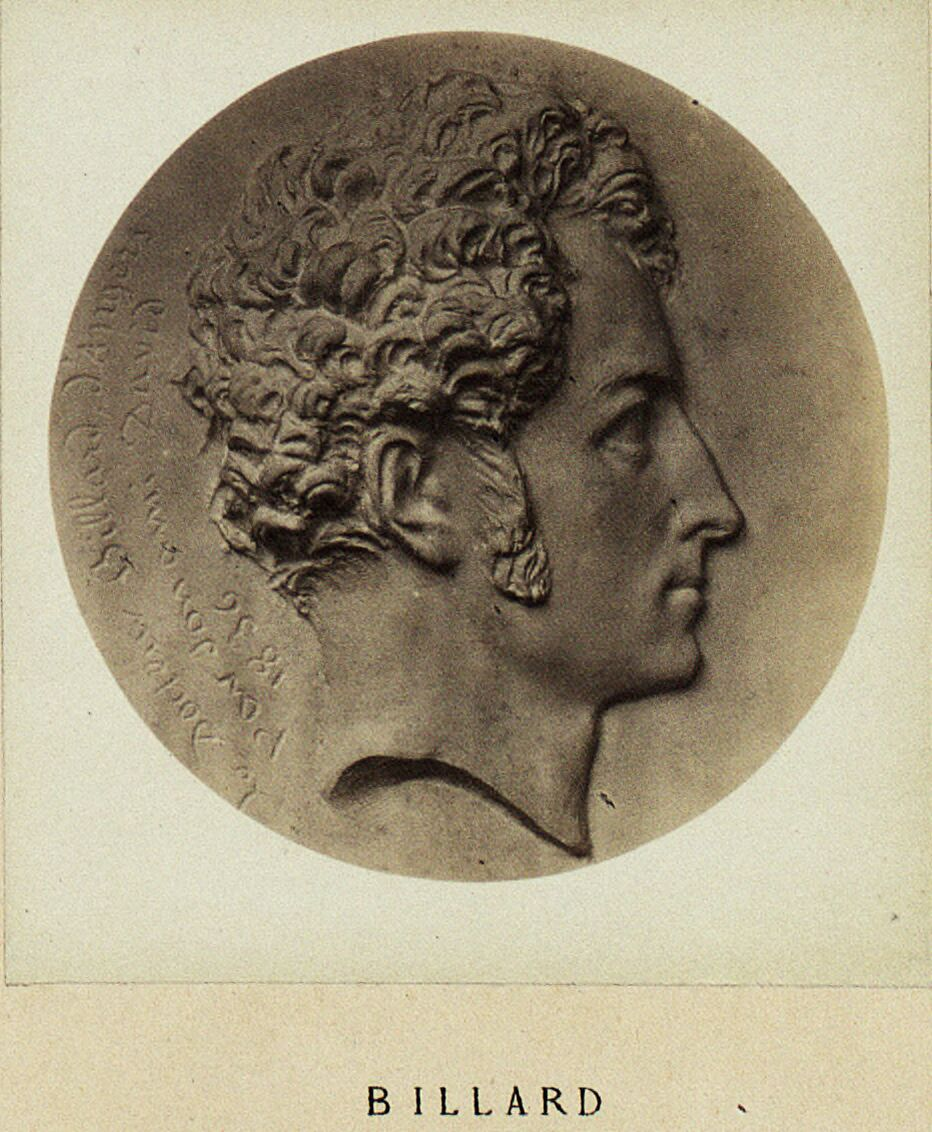
Charles-Michel Billard

Charles-Michel Billard (16 June 1800, Pellouailles-les-Vignes – 31 January 1832, Angers) was a French medical doctor, best known for his research of pediatric diseases.

He studied in Laval and Angers, then in 1824 relocated to Paris, where he found employment at the Hôpital des Enfants-Trouvés. In 1828 he received his medical degree, then returned to Angers, where he started a medical practice. He died in Angers from tuberculosis on January 31, 1832 (age 31).

== Published works ==
In 1828 he published his best work, a book on newborn illnesses, titled "Traité des maladies des enfants nouveau nés et à la mamelle". In 1832 Charles-Prosper Ollivier d'Angers published a second edition of the work, and in 1837, a third French edition was issued. It was also translated into German by Friedrich Ludwig Meissner (1829), and in 1839 the third French edition was translated into English and published with the title of "A treatise on the diseases of infants". His other noted written efforts include:

- 1825: "De la membrane muqueuse gastro-intestinale dans l'état sain et dans l'état inflammatoire" – On the gastrointestinal mucous membrane in healthy and inflammatory conditions.
- 1825: He published a translation of Thomas Thomson's work on the principles of chemistry as "Principes de la chimie, établis par les expériences, ou Essai sur les proportions définies dans la composition des corps".
- 1826: He contributed information on the history of fetal malformations to Michel Chevreul's "Précis de l'Art des Accouchements".
- 1828: "Atlas d'anatomie pathologique pour servir à l'histoire des maladies des enfans" – Atlas of pathological anatomy in regards to the history of childhood diseases.
- 1830: "Traité pratique sur les maladies des yeux, ou, Leçons données à l'infirmerie opthalmique de Londres en 1825 et 1826, sur l'anatomie, la physiologie et la pathologie des yeux" – A treatise on diseases of the eye. In regards to lessons given at the ophthalmic clinic in London in 1825 and 1826 by William Lawrence.
