= François Louis Isidore Valleix =

French pediatrician (1807–1855)

François Louis Isidore Valleix (14 January 1807 in Toulouse – 12 July 1855 in Paris) was a French pediatrician.

He studied medicine in Paris, where in 1831 he began work as a hospital intern. In 1835 he received his medical doctorate with a thesis on slow asphyxia of the newborn. In 1836 he became médecin du Bureau central, and from 1841 onward, served as médecin des hôpitaux in Paris. He died in 1855 after contracting diphtheria from a sick child.

In 1834, he became a member of the Société anatomique de Paris. His name is associated with "Valleix's points", described as: various points in the course of a nerve, about which, applied pressure causes pain in cases of neuralgia.

== Principal works ==
- De l'asphyxie lente chez les enfans nouveau-nés, 1835 – Slow asphyxia of the newborn.
- Clinique des maladies des enfants nouveau-nés, 1838 – Clinical illnesses of the newborn.
- Traité des névralgies, ou, Affections douloureuses des nerfs, 1841 – Treatise on neuralgia; painful disorders of the nerves.
- Guide du medecin praticien : ou résumé general de pathologie interne et de therapeutique appliquées (10 volumes), 1842-1847 – Guide for the medical practitioner; general summary of internal pathology and applied therapeutics.
