= Nicolas-Philibert Adelon =

French physician and physiologist

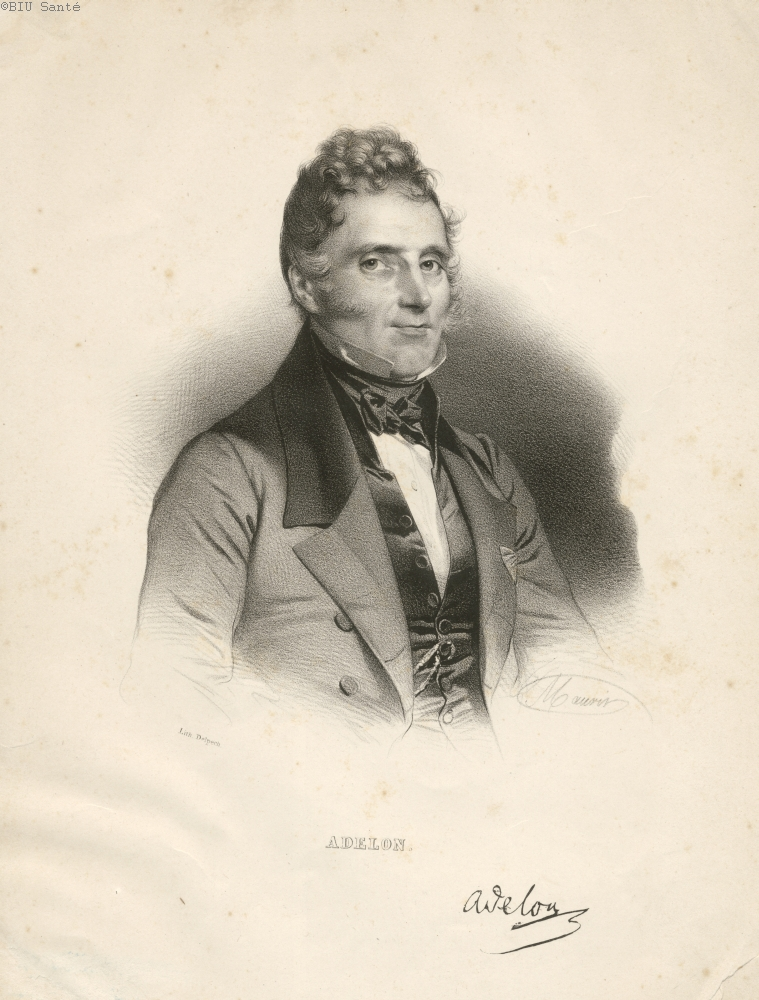
Nicolas-Philibert Adelon

Nicolas-Philibert Adelon (20 August 1782, Dijon – 19 July 1862, Paris) was a French medical doctor and physiologist.

He studied medicine in Paris, receiving his doctorate in 1809 with the thesis "Dissertation sur les fonctions de la peau". In 1823 he obtained his agrégation for physiology, and in 1826 succeeded Antoine-Athanase Royer-Collard as chair of forensic medicine at the University of Paris, a position he maintained up until 1861.

In 1821 he became a member of the Académie nationale de médecine, being elected as its president in 1831. He was also a founding member of the Société anatomique de Paris (1803).

== Published works ==
He is remembered for his publication of the medical dictionary, "Dictionnaire de médecine" (21 volumes, 1821-28; in collaboration with Pierre-Auguste Béclard and Laurent-Théodore Biett). Its second edition contained 30 volumes, and was published with the title "Dictionnaire de médecine ou répertoire général des sciences médicales" (1832-46). His other noted works include:

- Analyse d'un Cours du Docteur Gall ou Physiologie et anatomie du cerveau, (1808).
- Physiologie de l'homme (4 volumes, 1823–24).
- He made contributions to the "Dictionaire des sciences médicales" (60 volumes, 1812–22; principal editors: François-Pierre Chaumeton and François Victor Mérat de Vaumartoise).
- With François Chaussier, he published an edition of Giovanni Battista Morgagni's "De sedibus et causis morborum per anatomen indagatis" (1821).
