= Bernard Seurre =

French sculptor (1795-1867)

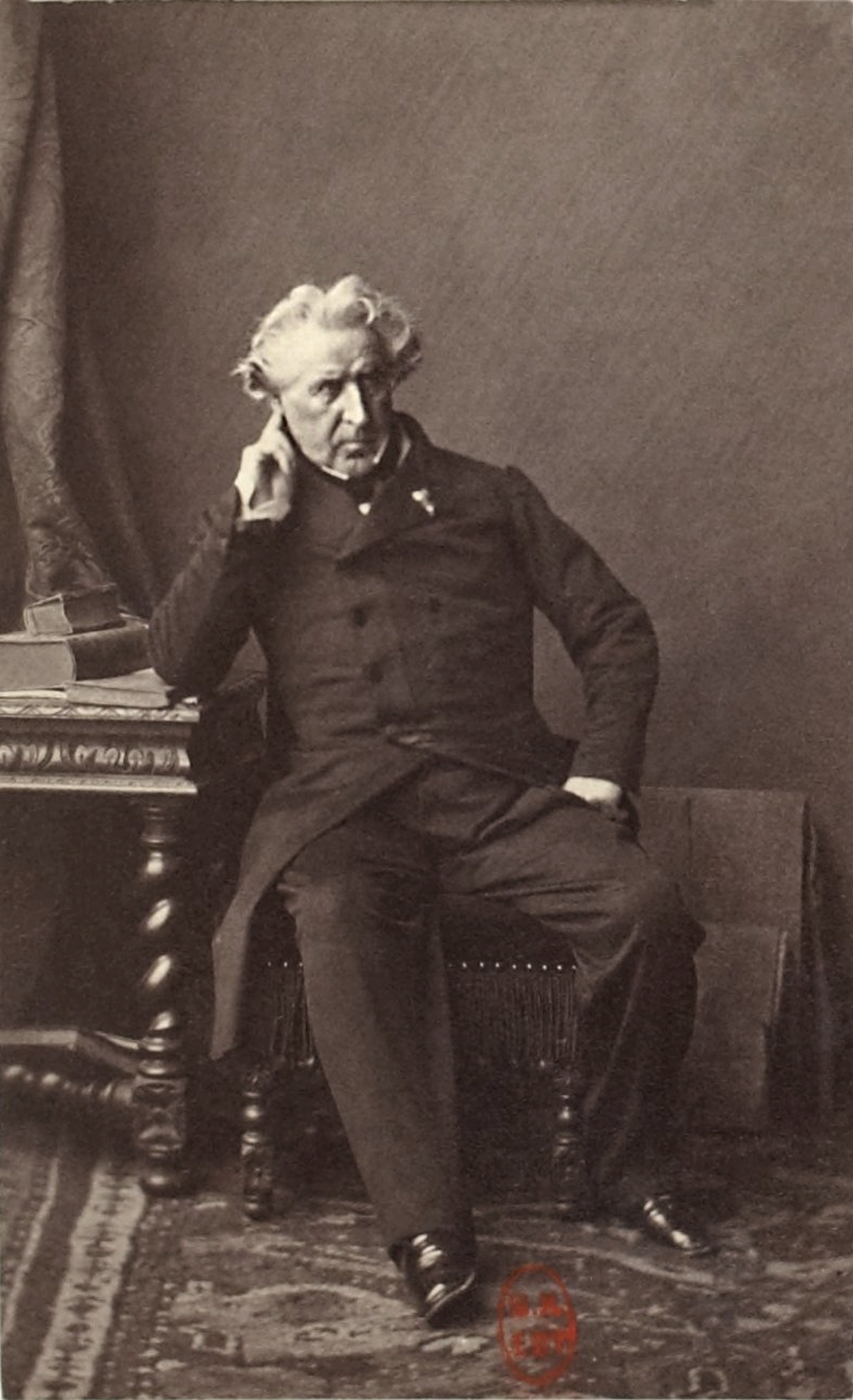
Bernard Seurre (1865)

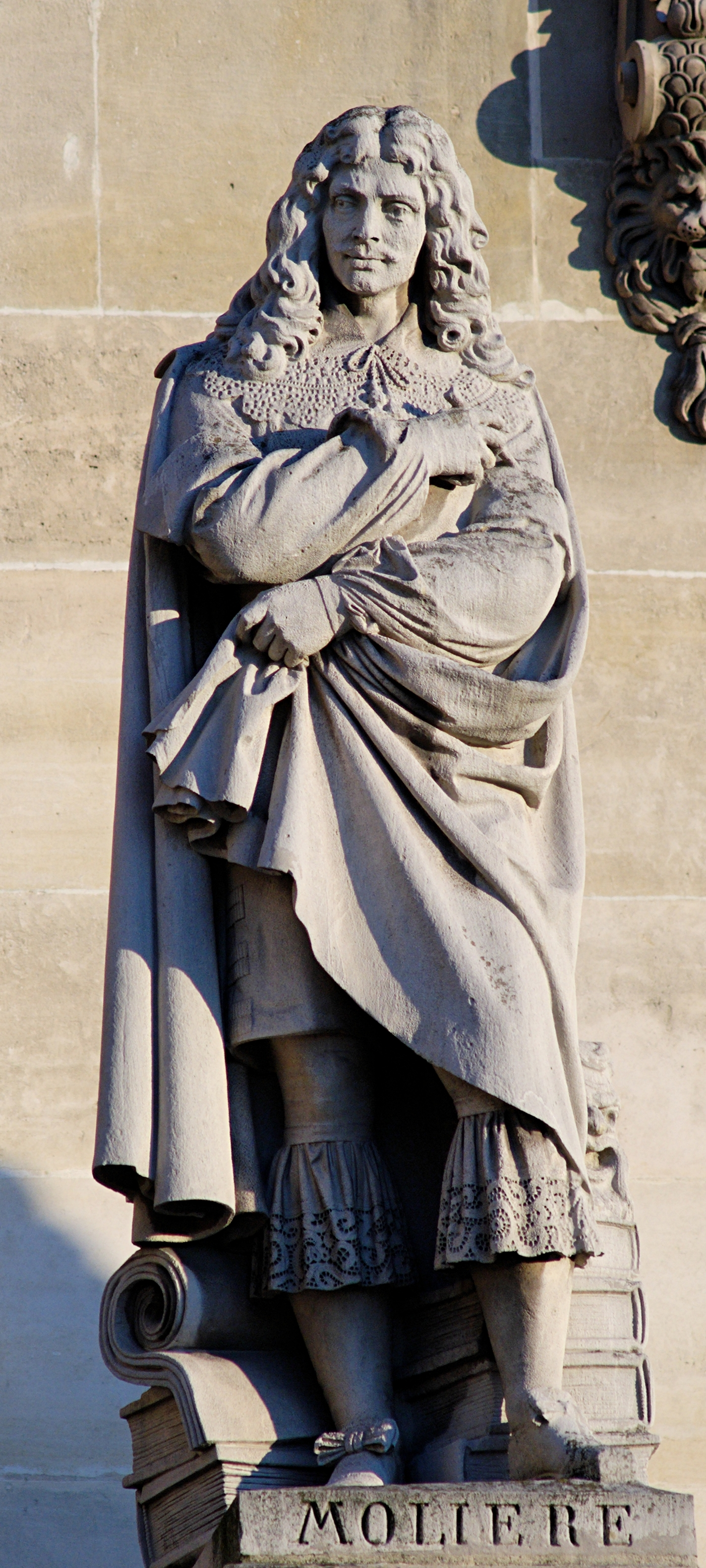
Molière by Seurre the elder, cour Napoléon of the palais du Louvre

Bernard-Gabriel Seurre or Seurre the Elder (French: [bɛʁnaʁ sœʁ]; 11 July 1795 – 3 October 1867) was a French sculptor. His younger brother Charles Émile Seurre (1798–1858) was also a sculptor.

== Life ==
Born in Paris, Bernard Seurre was a student of the sculptor Pierre Cartellier. In 1818 Bernard Seurre won the Prix de Rome for sculpture with a relief on the subject Chilonis imploring mercy for her husband Cleombrotus He then produced sculptures for the Arc de Triomphe between 1833 and 1836 and produced a design for a sculpture on top of it in 1833 (though this was never realized).

He died in Paris.

== Works ==
=== Arc de triomphe ===
- The Battle of Aboukir, bas-relief, stone, east façade (champs-Élysées side), above The Apotheosis of Napoleon I and The Triumph of 1810 by Jean-Pierre Cortot
- Entablature frieze, west façade (avenue de la Grande-Armée side), right half
- Entablature frieze, south façade (avenue Kléber side), left half
- Design for sculpture on top of the Arc de triomphe - allegory of France victorious (1833), drawing, Paris, musée d'Orsay

=== Other ===
- Molière standing in meditation, over-life-size, bronze, Paris, Musée du Louvre
- Molière, bronze, Paris, 1844, fontaine Molière, junction of rue de Richelieu and la rue Molière
- Jean de La Fontaine, statue, marble, Paris, palais de l'Institut
- Modesty, statue, Paris, cimetière du Père-Lachaise, tomb of Pierre Cartellier, left side
- Portrait of Nicolas Béhuchet, admiral of France, died 1340 (vers 1838), bust, plaster, Versailles, châteaux de Versailles et de Trianon

== Sources ==
- (in French) Pierre Kjellberg, Le Nouveau guide des statues de Paris, La Bibliothèque des Arts, Paris, 1988.
- (in French) Emmanuel Schwartz, Les Sculptures de l'École des Beaux-Arts de Paris. Histoire, doctrines, catalogue, École nationale supérieure des Beaux-Arts, Paris, 2003.
- (in French) Charles Reutlinger, Portrait de Bernard Gabriel Seurre, photographs, Paris, musée d'Orsay
