= Gustave Crauck =

French sculptor (1827–1905)

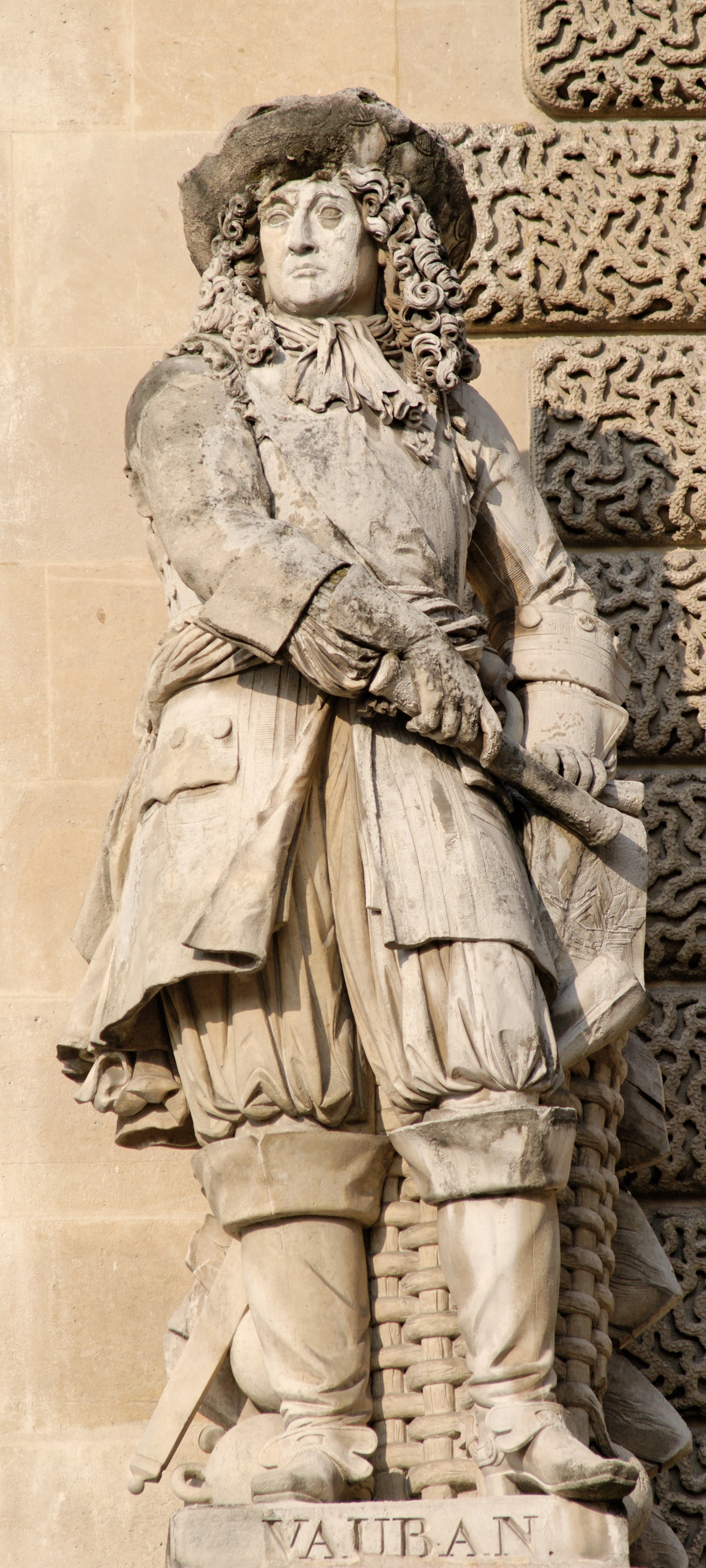
Vauban by Crauck, Cour Napoléon of the Palais du Louvre

Gustave Adolphe Désiré Crauck (or Crauk; 16 July 1827 – 17 November 1905) was a French sculptor with a long distinguished career.

He was born and died at Valenciennes, where a special museum for his works was erected in his honor. Educated at the École des Beaux-Arts, Crauck took the Prix de Rome in 1851.

Little known to the world at large during his long life, he ranks among the best modern sculptors of France. At Paris his Coligny monument is in the rue de Rivoli; his Victory in the Place des Arts et Métiers; and Twilight in the Avenue de l'Observatoire. Among his finest works is his Combat du Centaure, on which he was engaged for thirty years, the figure of the Lapith having been modelled after the strongman, Eugen Sandow.

He also sculpted the monuments of Jules-Auguste Béclard and Edmond About among several of his works at Père Lachaise Cemetery in Paris. He contributed the figures of Douai and Dunkirk to the façade of the Gare du Nord, and contributed the figure of Vauban for the façade of the Palais du Louvre.

In 1907 an exhibition of his works was held in the École des Beaux-Arts.
