= Pierre Augustin Béclard =

French anatomist and surgeon

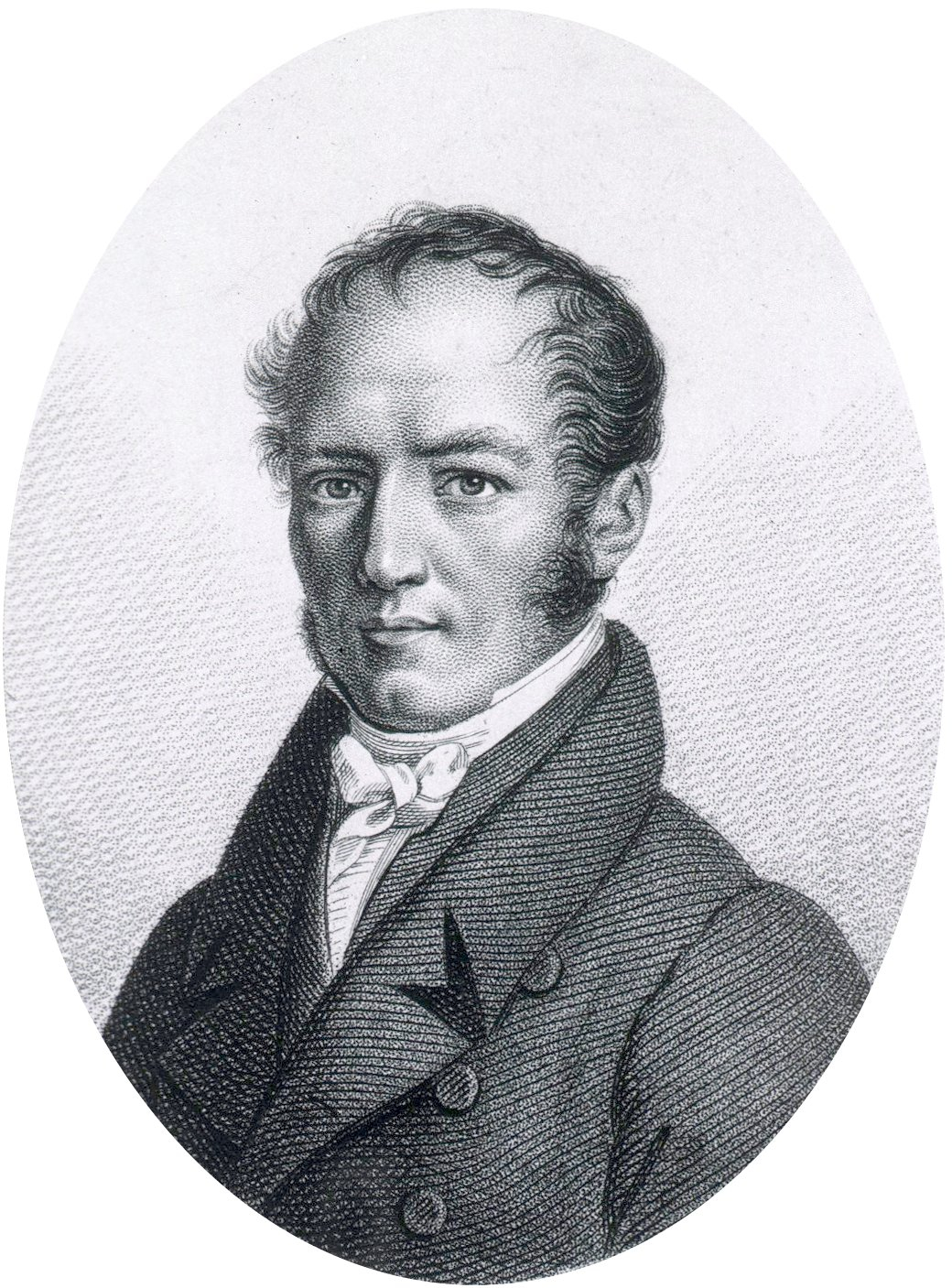
- Born: 12 October 1785
- Died: 16 March 1825 (aged 39)
- Occupations: anatomist and surgeon
- Known for: new surgical practices
- Children: Jules-Auguste Béclard
- Medical career
- Institutions: Pitié Hospital
- Notable works: Traité des hernies

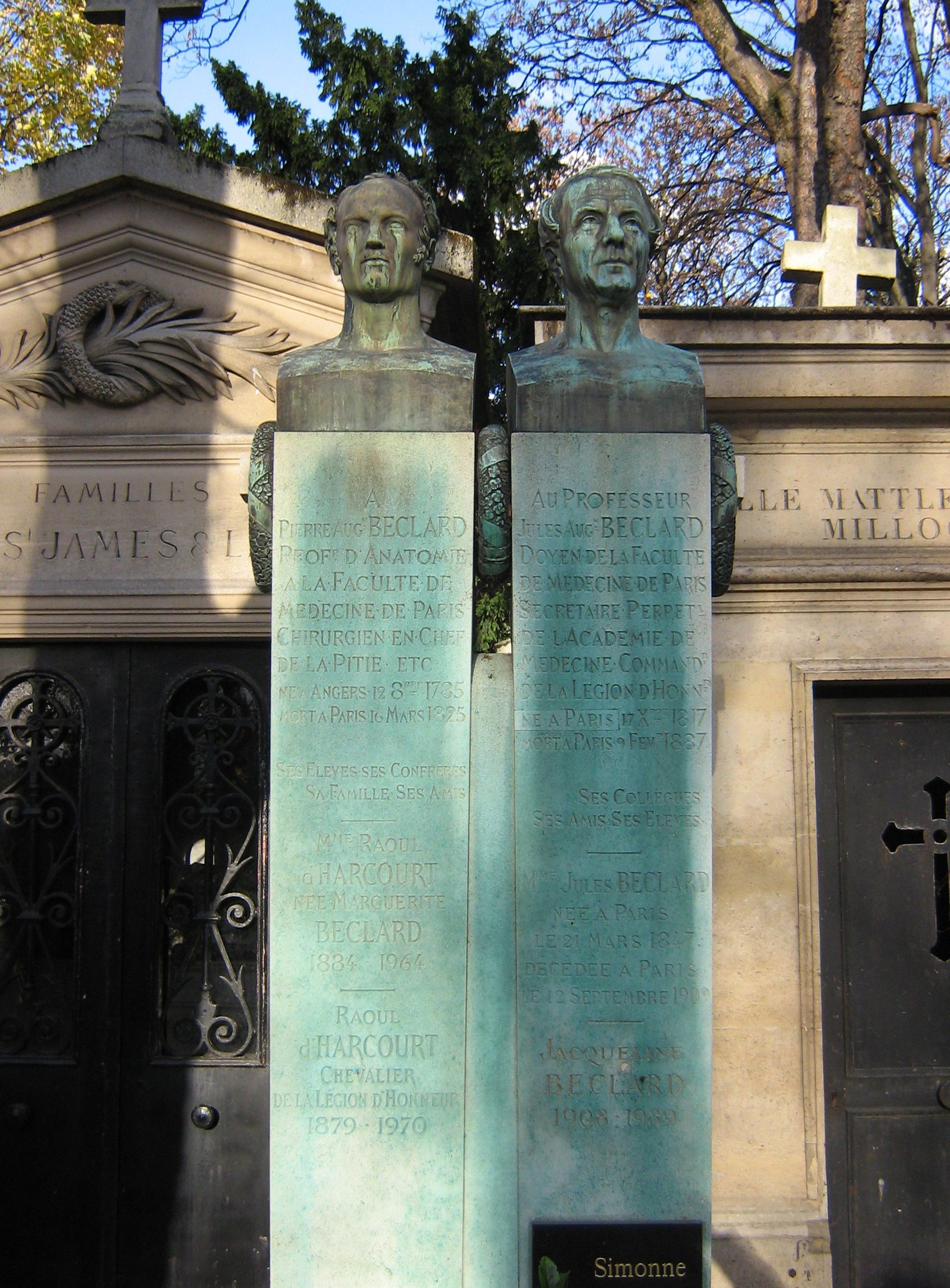
Monument to Pierre Augustin Beclard and his son Jules Auguste Beclard, Pere Lachaise Cemetery, Paris, sculptor Gustave Crauck

Pierre Augustin Béclard (12 October 1785 – 16 March 1825) was a French anatomist and surgeon, and a native of Angers. He is the father of physiologist Jules-Auguste Béclard.

He was a professor of anatomy in Paris and chief surgeon at Pitié Hospital, and in 1818 he was appointed to the chair of anatomy. He was considered a brilliant lecturer. With Jules Germain Cloquet, he translated William Lawrence's work on hernias from English into French as Traité des hernies.

Pierre Béclard is credited with introducing new amputative and surgical practices, performing in 1823 an extirpation of the parotid gland. His name is lent to the eponymous "Béclard's nucleus", defined as the core of ossification in the cartilage of the distal epiphysis of the femur during the latter part of fetal life. It is used in forensic medicine to determine the age of a fetus or newborn infant.

== Additional eponyms ==
- Beclard's anastomosis: or arcus raninus, An anastomosis between the right and the left end-branch of the deep lingual artery.
- Béclard's hernia: A femoral hernia through the opening of the saphenous vein.
- Béclard's triangle: An area whose boundaries are the posterior border of the hyoglossus, the posterior belly of the digastric muscle and the greater horn of the hyoid bone.

== Works ==
- Nouveau dictionnaire de médecine, chirurgie, pharmacie, physique, chimie, histoire naturelle, etc. . Vol. 1&2 . Gabon, Paris 1821-1822 Digital edition by the University and State Library Düsseldorf
