= Moncey =

Moncey may refer to:

- Bon Adrien Jeannot de Moncey (1754–1842), Marshal of France, and a prominent soldier in the French Revolution and Napoleonic Wars
- Moncey, Doubs, a commune of the Doubs département in France

== See also ==
- Moncé
