= List of works by James Pradier =

This is a list of works by the Swiss-born French sculptor James Pradier (1790–1852). He was best known for his work in the neoclassical style.

== Works in cathedrals and churches ==
Name~	Location	Date	Notes
Statue of Saint Pierre	Église Saint Sulpice. Paris	1822	Pradier executed a plaster statue of St Peter for this Paris church but it appears to have disappeared.
"Le martyre de Saint André"	Église Saint Roch. Paris	1823	This work celebrating the martyrdom of Saint André (St Andrew) is located on the left hand side of the church's transept
"La Vierge en prière"	La Cathédrale Notre Dame des Doms Avignon	1838	In 1834 Avignon suffered badly from a cholera epidemic and the statue of the Virgin Mary in prayer, her eyes lifted to heaven, was commissioned to acknowledge the Virgin Mary's help in sustaining the people of Avignon during that epidemic. The statue stands in the cathedral's "Chapelle de la Résurrection". It was shown at the Paris Salon of 1838. At the base of the statue are the words "Et etiam interpellat pro nobis" to remind all that the Virgin Mary had intervened for them. "Chapelle de la Résurrection"-"La Vierge en prière"
La Madeleine	Paris	1842	Pradier's "Le Mariage de la Vierge" can be seen near the vestibule and from 1833 to 1834 he also worked on the four bas-reliefs depicting the apostles. These are to be seen in the choir area. Several years earlier Pradier had entered the competition for the huge pediment sculpture on the church's facade but was unsuccessful, Philippe Joseph Henri Lemaire receiving the commission. Pradier's entry was entitled "La Madeleine pardonnée par le Christ". It was held in the Musée de Lisieux until destroyed during the Second World War.
"La Vierge en prière" and other works	Église paroissiale Saint-Nicolas, Saint-Marc in Ville-d'Avray	1838	It was in 1830 that Pradier came to live in Ville d'Avray and in the town's small Roman Catholic church one can see versions of three of his works, "Le Mariage de la Vierge","La Vierge en prière"and the plaster version of the statue of Saint Louis which can be seen in Aigues-Mortes. All three plaster models were gifts given by Pradier to the church in 1840.
"Pietà"-("Christ sur les genoux de la Vierge")	Chapelle Saint-Charles-Borromée de la Pauline in La Garde in Var	1847	This marble "Pietà" was shown at the 1847 Paris Salon but when no order came from the French State, Pradier tried to interest the authorities in Toulon and Nîmes in the work. In Nîmes a new church, Saint Pauls was being built and the architect was Questel with whom Pradier had worked on the "Fontaine de l'Esplanade". Neither approach had a positive outcome but finally in 1850 the work was purchased by a Madame Farnous and placed in the neo-gothic Chapelle Saint-Charles-Borromée erected between 1850 and 1852 near Toulon. In his composition the Virgin Mary is depicted supporting the body of the dead Christ between her knees. Apart from the "Pietà", Pradier sculpted the bas-relief in the tympanum over the church's entrance which depicts Saint Charles-Borromée administering to the plague victims in Milan ("Saint-Charles Borromée soignant les pestiférés de Milan") and the window over the chapel's entrance has a small ledge on which sits a carving of "L'Ange de la Resurrection". Finally on the two buttresses at each end of the church's façade there are statues of Saint Charles-Borromée and Sainte Thérèse. The Musée d'art et d'histoire in Geneva showed a plaster reduction of the "Pietà" at their 1985-1986 exhibition. Full size copies of the work in plaster are held by the Musée de Vieux-Nîmes and La chapelle de la Maison d'Education de la Légion d'Honneur at Saint Denis. "Christ sur les genoux de la Vierge"
The Stations of the Cross	Sainte-Clotilde, Paris	1850	Pradier executed seven bas-reliefs for Sainte-Clotilde's depicting the Stations of the Cross. These were depictions of Pontius Pilate in the act of washing his hands, Christ carrying the Cross, Jesus falling for the first time under the weight of the Cross, Jesus being consoled by his mother, Simon of Cyrène helping carry the Cross, Veronica seeing Christ's image on her veil, and Jesus falling for the second time. When Pradier died the work had not been completed and was finished off by Eugène Lequesne and Jean-Baptiste Claude Eugène Guillaume in 1852. Pontius Pilate washes his hands
"Le Christ en croix"	Leningrad	1841 to 1844	This work in marble was executed for the tomb of Count Paul Demidoff

== Public statues and monuments in Paris ==
Name	Location	Date	Notes
Bust of Daniel Auber	Opéra de Paris	1847	The whereabouts of the marble bust of this composer, shown at the Paris Salon of 1847, is unknown but the Opéra de Paris (Palais Garnier) hold a plaster model and a bronze replica is on the façade of the Opéra building.
"L'Industrie"	Palais Brongniart	1851	Outside this building, named after its architect Alexandre Brongniart and now serving as the Bourse de Paris (Stock Exchange) there are four marble allegorical statues including Pradier's "L'Industrie". In his sculpture, the female allegory for "Industry" is seated and has a large hammer slung over her left shoulder whilst her right hand rests on a large cog against which is propped a circular saw and around her are an anvil and a beehive, both symbolising work and a cockerel. The other statues are "La Justice" by François Duret, "Le Commerce" by Augustin Dumont and "L'Agriculture" by Charles Émile Seurre. This building was also known as "Le Palais de la Bourse" and the "Tribunal de Commerce". In 1825-1827 Pradier executed a work in plaster for an earlier project for the Bourse de Paris. The work was entitled "La Fortune publique" and was subsequently destroyed.
"A horsed Amazon"	Cirque d'hiver	1840-1841	An equestrian statue made from cast iron was executed to decorate the entry to the old Cirque d'été in Paris. Whereabouts of this not known but in 1852 a replica was made, also in cast-iron, and this decorates the Cirque d'hiver.
"L'lnstruction publique", "La Liberté" and "L'Ordre public"	Paris, Assemblée nationale (Chambre des députés)	1832 and 1938	On the front of the Palais Bourbon, now the site of France's Assemblée nationale, and on either side of Cortot's central relief over the colonnade "La France entre la Liberté et l'Ordre public." are two smaller bas-reliefs. On the right is François Rude's "Prométhée animant les Arts" and on the left is Pradier's "L'Instruction publique". Pradier's relief reflected the recent law framed by François Guizot and passed through the French parliament in June 1833 which made radical changes to France's educational system particularly at the primary stage and in the centre of Pradier's composition a helmeted Minerva recites the initial letters of the alphabet surrounded by several attentive children and the nine muses. To Minerva's left the role of the church in Guizot's law is recorded, with a depiction of a woman holding an open book in which she writes "Écriture Sainte" whilst to her right, a young woman learns to read. The nine muses remind us of the role of science and the arts in education. Earlier in 1832 Pardier completed two sculptures for the "salle de séance" these being entitled "La Liberté" and "L'Ordre public"
Decoration on the façade of the Palais du Luxembourg	Paris	1840-1841	Pradier was commissioned to execute the decoration around the clock on the facade of the Palais du Luxembourg facing the Palais' gardens and he produced four statues in ronde-bosse "La Sagesse", "L'Eloquence", "La Prudence" and "La Justice", two high-reliefs, "La Guerre" and "la Paix" and three bas-reliefs, "Le Jour", "La Nuit" and "Un Genie". The bas-reliefs surround the clock and "La Nuit" turns her back to the viewer whilst "Le Jour" is shown full face. The "génie" is surrounded by the signs of the zodiac, garlands and bunting. The figures of la Guerre, Sagesse and Eloquence are positioned to the left of Le Jour, la Nuit and the génie whilst Prudence, Justice, and la Paix are to their right. Decoration on the façade of the Palais du Luxembourg.
Fontaine Molière	Paris	1839-1843	It was the architect Louis Visconti who designed this monument and Bernard-Gabriel Seurre was commissioned to execute the sculpture of Molière. Pradier's sculpture of Molière was not used but he was asked to execute the two allegorical figures that stand on either side of the pedestal. These, finished in marble, were "la Comédie légère" and "la Comédie sérieuse" ("Light Comedy" and "Serious Comedy") although the names given them in 1844 were "la Muse enjouée" and "la Muse grave". Each figure holds a scroll upon which the names of Molière's works were listed. At the very bottom are lion masks, from which the water pours into a semi-circular basin.
Statues representing "Victory" or Napoleon's military campaigns.	Paris Les Invalides	1843 to 1852	12 white marble statues surround the tomb of Napoleon in the crypt of Le Dôme des Invalides, l'église du Dôme each having a height of 3.350 metres. The statues are mounted against the crypt's pillars. In the photograph shown below of Napoleon's sarcophagus we see some of these "Victory" statues. The statues represented Napoleon's military campaigns which included the Italian campaign of 1795, the Syrian campaign of 1799, the Polish campaign of 1807, the Spanish campaign of 1808, that of 1809 in Austria, of 1813 in Saxe and of 1814 in France and 1815 in Belgium. Napoleon's tomb
Statues representing Lille and Strasbourg	Place de la Concorde Paris	1836 to 1838	Using the octagonal shape of the Place de la Concorde, the designing architect Jacques Ignace Hittorff had statues constructed at the eight extremities each representing a French city and Pradier was commissioned to execute the statues representing Lille and Strasbourg. The female figure representing Strasbourg sits on a rock, her feet resting on a canon. She exudes haughty defiance, her right hand resting on her hip whilst a sword rests in the crook of her left arm. Lille also sits on a rock and has a sword slung across her shoulder. Interesting to note that after the Franco-Prussian war when Alsace-Lorraine was lost to Germany, the Strasbourg statue was covered in black mourning crepe and thereafter was often covered with wreaths, a practice which did not end until France regained the region after the 1914-1918 war. A photograph of the Strasbourg statue is shown below and that of Lille appears in the gallery at the end of the article. The other statues are Brest and Rouen by Jean-Pierre Cortot, Lyon and Marseille by Pierre Petitot and Bordeaux and Nantes by Louis-Denis Caillouette.
"Les Renommées" - L'Arc de triomphe de Étoile.	Paris	1829	Pradier was commissioned to execute four bas-reliefs for the spandrels or cornerstones of the central arcade of the Arc de Triomphe and chose these winged Greek allegories as subjects. The tensions following the 1830 revolution had meant that Pradier lost the commission for the reliefs on the Arc du Carrousel so the Arc de Triomphe commission was a slight compensation for this although he was not given the more substantial commissions for the larger arch which went to Rude, Cortot and Etex. The sculptor did in fact prepare a maquette in 1834 for a sculpture to adorn the top of the monument but was never given the commission. This maquette was entitled "La France distribuant des couronnes". He executed another composition for the top of the arc called "Apothéose de Napoléon 1" but this was not used. Plaster models of the "Renommées" were held in the Musée de Lisieux but were destroyed during the Second World War. "Les Renommées"

== Busts and statues of Louis Philippe I and other members of Royal family ==
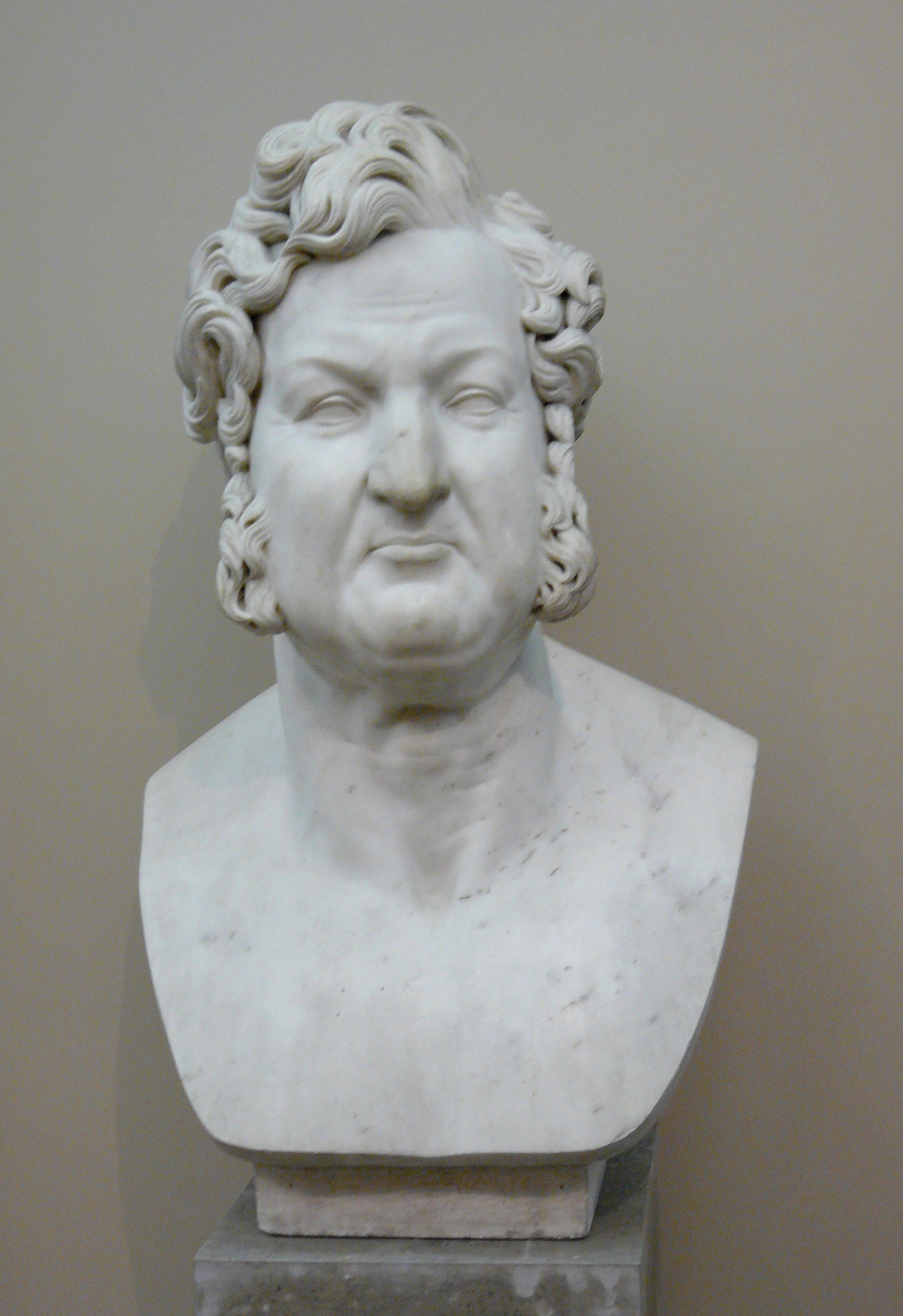

Pardier was well regarded by the king and was commissioned to execute several busts and statues of family members as well as effigies for family tombs. Below is a photograph of Pradier's 1834 bust of Louis Philippe I (1773–1850) who reigned from 1830 to 1848 in the period known as the July monarchy. This bust can be seen in the Musée du Louvre département des Sculptures. Several busts of the King were executed by Pradier. The first was in 1830, a plaster bust celebrating Louis-Philippe's accession to the French throne and in a bust executed in 1841, the king is depicted wearing a crown of oak leaves. Pradier also executed works depicting Maria Amalia of Naples and Sicily, the King's wife. One such work can be seen in the Chateau de Chantilly. When Ferdinand-Philippe Duke of Orléans, the King's eldest son was killed in an accident in 1842, Louis-Philippe commissioned Pradier to take casts of Ferdinand-Philippe's head, hands and feet to ensure that any future sculptures would be true to his son's likeness and Pradier produced several works using these casts including a memorial bust, a monument to the Duke and a bronze medallion

== Public statues and monuments outside of Paris ==
Pradier's grandfather had been from the Gard region and apart from his work in Paris his friends in the French MIDI, particularly Nîmes, helped him secure commissions in that area. Some of these are listed below.

Name	Location	Date	Notes
Robert III d'Artois	Château de Versailles	1842	A statue executed in plaster.
Fontaine Pradier or "La Fontaine de l'Esplanade"	Nîmes	1851	Part of the Fontaine Pradier Nîmes was enjoying a period of prosperity when, in 1844, it was decided to construct this public fountain to celebrate Nîmes' various sources of water. The architect Charles-Auguste Questel was charged with the fountain's design and Pradier with the sculptural work involved and a plaster model of the proposed fountain can be seen in the Nîmes Musée de beaux-arts. At the centre of Questel/Pradier's composition is a female representation of Nîmes, who holds an olive branch in one hand symbolizing the wish to appease Nîmes' religious and political divisions and in her other hand she holds a shield bearing the arms of Nîmes. On her head Pradier puts a somewhat bizarre crown which includes the façades of Nîmes' ancient buildings, the Arena of Nîmes and the colonnaded Maison Carrée and the Palais de Justice, newly constructed in a neo-classical style. Four allegories placed beneath the statue representing Nîmes, celebrate the four sources of water and each has its name written in Latin. A seated Jupiter represents the river Rhône, Latin "Rhodanus", one of whose arms rests of a mask of "tragedy" and from which water flows into the central basin. The river Gardon, "Vardo" in Latin, a tributary of the Rhône, is symbolized by Neptune and his trident and his feet rest on an amphora from which water flows. Two springs, the sources of water other than the Rhône and the Gardon are represented by two nymphs. One represents the source known as "L'Eure" or "Ura" in Latin, which originates from a spring near Uzès and the other the "Fontaine de Nîmes" or "Namausa" in Latin, this spring used by the Romans in the early colony
Bust of Jean Pierre Joseph d'Arcet	Château de Prunay, Louveciennes	1845	D'Arcet was Pradier's father-in-law and a member of the Académie des Sciences as well as Commissaire générale à l'Hôtel des Monnaies. A replica of the marble bust but in bronze was placed on d'Arcet's tomb in the Père Lachaise cemetery. In 1834 Pradier had produced a statuette of his father-in-law which he exhibited at the Paris Salon of 1835.
Statue of Théodore Simon Jouffroy	Besançon	1847	This marble statue of the French philosopher is located in Besançon's municipal library.
Monument to the Aymards	Villemoustaussou	Date execution not known	A bronze bust of Edouard Aymard features on this monument located in Villemoustaussou's rue du Général-Aymard. Cast after the sculptors' death and based on a marble bust he had executed during his lifetime.The monument was inaugurated in 1903 and is dedicated to both Général Antoine Aymard and his son Général Edouard Aymard both born in Villemoustaussou.
Statue of Louis IX	Aigues-Mortes	1847 to 1848	Statue of Louis IX (Saint Louis) Pradier's monument to Louis IX was inaugurated in 1849 and originally comprised a bronze depiction of the king on a pedestal but in 1896 it was converted into a public fountain and dolphins and basins were added to the pedestal. Louis IX King of France was one of the promoters of the Crusades in the Holy Land in the 13th century and to give the crusaders a convenient departure point when sailing to the Middle East he ordered the construction of the fortified city of Aigues-Mortes, on the shores of the Mediterranean Sea

== Funerary sculpture ==
Name	Location	Date	Notes
Tomb of Françoise Louise Caroline d'Orléans Mademoiselle de Montpensier	Chapelle royale de Dreux	1847	Pradier executed the effigy for the tomb of Louis Philippe I's daughter, Françoise Caroline d'Orléans known as Mademoiselle de Montpensier, who died at the age of 2. This work was shown at the 1847 Paris Salon and the plaster model can be seen in Poitiers' Musée Sainte-Croix. In Pradier's sublime composition, the sleeping Mademoiselle de Montpensier clutches a Cross.
Charles d'Orléans, Duke of Penthièvre	Chapelle royale de Dreux	1847	Charles d'Orléans was the eighth child of Louis Philippe I and he was created Duke of Penthièvre, a title previously held by his great-grandfather. The effigy was ordered at the same time as that for the two-year-old Françoise Louise Caroline d'Orléans Mademoiselle de Montpensier. Charles had never enjoyed good health and died in 1828 at the age of 8. This work was shown at the 1847 Paris Salon. Charles d'Orléans, Duke of Penthièvre and son of Louis-Philippe
Le monument au duc de Berry	La chapelle Saint-Charles-Borromée. Versailles. Cathédrale Saint-Louis.	1821-1823	When Charles Ferdinand, Duke of Berry was assassinated in 1820 it was decided that a monument be erected in his memory. Pradier's marble composition "La Religion" was chosen and the monument was installed in the cathedral of Versailles' chapelle Saint-Charles-Borromée. Apart from the main composition of the dying Duke being supported by an angel, there are three bas-reliefs on the pedestal. Pradier also executed in 1825-1826 a marble relief entitled "Les Derniers Moments du duc de Berry" and this can be seen in Auxerre's église abbatiale Saint-Germain.
Tomb of Louis Charles, Count of Beaujolais	St. John's Co-Cathedral. Valletta	1835	It was in 1808 that Louis Charles travelled to Gibraltar, Sicily and Malta. He was in ill-health and it was hoped that this trip would help him but he was to die of tuberculosis a fortnight after his arrival on the island of Malta. His body was buried on April 10, 1818, in St. John's Co-Cathedral in Valletta and Pradier designed and sculpted his tomb featuring a reclining figure and sarcophagus. There is a replica of the tomb at Dreux. Louis Charles was the brother of Louis-Philippe.
Tomb of André Amenlier	Cimetière Protestant Nîmes	1852	In 1850 Pradier was commissioned to execute a sculpture for the tomb of André Amenlier buried in Nîmes' Protestant cemetery. The sculpture requested was to represent "L'Immortalité de l'âme ou l'Espérance en Dieu" and Pradier's final sculpture was entitled "l'Immortalité". This was Pradier's final sculpture.

== Works in the Louvre and Musée d'Orsay ==
Name	Location	Date	Notes
"Niobide blessé"	Paris: Musée du Louvre département des Sculptures	1822	Niobė blessé-one of Niobė's sons hit by an arrow in his back fired by Artemis This work is also known under title "Un fils de Niobé". The Louvre hold a marble version of a plaster composition which Pradier carried out whilst in Rome in December 1817 and subsequently sent to the École des Beaux-arts in Paris. Pradier takes his subject from verses 146 to 312 of book 6 of Ovid's "Metamorphosis". The work was submitted to the Paris Salon of 1822 from where it was purchased by the French State. In the sculpture one of the Niobids has received an arrow in his back, this fired by Artemis.
"Psyché"	Paris; Musée du Louvre département des Sculptures	1824	Shown at the Paris Salon of 1824, this work was executed during Pradier's time in Rome.
"Prométhée"	Paris: Musée du Louvre département des Sculptures	1827	Pradier started this piece whilst in Rome and completed the plaster version in January 1824. In 1827, the marble version was submitted to the Paris Salon and in 1828 it was purchased by the French State. On 22 March 1832 it was placed in the Jardin des Tuileries and stayed there until 1993 when it was moved into the museum.
"Le Duc d'Angoulême congédie les envoyés de Cadix (6 September 1823)"	Paris; Musée du Louvre département des Sculptures	1829	Pradier was commissioned to execute reliefs for the Arc de Triomphe du Carrousel in 1828 but political turmoil at the time resulted in the project being put in suspense and Pradier's work was never used. The original plaster model has disappeared but the Louvre do have a portion of the relief in marble.
"Le Rhône"	Whereabouts not known	1829	Pradier executed a work in plaster for the projected "Fountaine de la Bastille".
"Trois Graces"	Paris; Musée du Louvre département des Sculptures	1831	Les trois Graces This work in marble was shown at the Paris Salon of 1831 and purchased by King Louis-Philippe. Reductions have been made in marble, bronze and plaster.
"Satyre et Bacchante"	The Louvre Aile Richelieu	1834	This composition in marble was acquired by the Louvre in 1980. It was shown at the Paris Salon of 1834. The original plaster version of 1833 is held by the Palais des Beaux-arts in Lille
Phidias	Paris; Musée du Louvre département des Sculptures	1835	This marble sculpture of the Greek sculptor was ordered in 1831 for the Louvre's courtyard but eventually placed in the Tuileries's garden in 1835 where it stayed until 1993 when moved into the Louvre. Pradier was in fact nicknamed "Phidias" by his friends.
Bust of Baron Gérard	Paris; Musée du Louvre département des Sculptures	1837	A marble bust of the French painter. Presented to the Paris Salon in 1838
Statuette-"Louise Colet en Penserosa"	Paris; Musée du Louvre département des Sculptures	1837	A statuette in plaster. A gift of Raymond-Clément-Émile Bissieu in accordance with the wishes of his mother Mme Colet-Bissieu, the daughter of Louise Colet
Bust of Charles Percier	Paris; Musée du Louvre département des Sculptures	1839	A marble bust of the French architect whose projects included work on the Louvre, the Tuileries Palace and the Arc du Carrousel.
"Odalisque dansant"	Musée du Louvre. Department of Sculptures	Date execution not known	With this bronze statuette, Pradier returned to the theme of the Turkish odalik but here portrayed her dancing.
"Diane and Endymion"	Paris; Musée du Louvre département des Sculptures	Date execution not known	A rare terracotta "esquisse" by the sculptor given to the Louvre in 1934 as part of the estate of Noémie Constant who had been taught by Pradier
"La Toilette d'Atalante"	The Louvre Aile Richelieu	1850	This composition is in white marble.
Maxime du Camp	Paris, Musée du Louvre	1850	This bronze bust was given to the museum as a gift by du Camp himself. Du Camp was an art critic, journalist and a friend of Flaubert. The casting was by Gonon. The bust was shown at the Paris Salon of 1850.
"Sapho"	Musée d'Orsay	1852	"Sapho" The Musée d'Orsay hold the marble version of "Sapho" which was shown at the Paris Salon of 1852. The Musée des Beaux-arts of Angers have a bronze reduction of the composition. The original model in plaster and wax and called "Penserosa" -(the thoughtful one) is held by the Paris Musée des Arts décoratifs. "Sapho" was on display at the Salon in 1852 when the sculptor died suddenly; the work was then covered with a black veil and the artist posthumously awarded the medal of honour. The sculptor Pierre-Charles Simart executed a relief of this work in marble for Pradier's tomb. Pradier also executed a statuette of Sapho standing ("Sapho debout") and this is a much reproduced piece in various mediums. The poet stands with one hand placed on an ornate Ionic column and in the other hand she holds a lyre. This was shown at the 1848 Paris Salon and a bronze version of the work is held in Osborne House having been acquired by Queen Victoria in 1853.

== Early works whilst a student in Paris and Rome ==
Name	Locationî	Date	Notes
"Chrysis, grand-prêtre d'Appolon, vient demander sa fille au camps des Grecs"	Whereabouts unknown-probably destroyed	1812	Records show that Pradier submitted a preliminary model ("Esquisse") for the Grand Prix de Rome competition in 1812
"Aristée pleurant la perte de ses abeilles"	Whereabouts unknown-probably destroyed	1812	Statue also submitted to Grand Prix de Rome competition in 1812
"Le bannissement de Coriolan" and "Une figure nue"	Whereabouts unknown-probably destroyed	1813	"Esquisses" submitted to Grand Prix de Rome competition in 1813.
"Orphée pleurant Eurydice"	Whereabouts unknown-probably destroyed	1815	
"Homère"	Whereabouts unknown-probably destroyed	1817	A marble bust.
"Ganymède"	Whereabouts unknown-probably destroyed	1817-1818	A statue in marble.

== Works in museums outside of Paris ==
Name	Location	Date	Notes
"Bacchante"	The Musée des Beaux-Arts Rouen	1819	Whilst studying in Rome at the Villa Médicis and as part of his studies, Pradier executed this work in marble. It was shown at the Salon of 1819 in Paris under the title "Nymph", but when it was pointed out that the subject was a bacchante the title was changed. The Salon awarded Pradier a "médaille d'or". A variation of this composition and also called "Bacchante" was executed in 1823.
Bust of Louis XVIII	Musée de Versailles	1824	
"Venus" (also known as "Venus surprised in her bath" or "Venus au bain")	Orléans Musée des Beaux-Arts	1829	A statue in marble.
"Jeune Chasseresse au repos"	Musée des Beaux-arts de Quimper	1830	This work in marble is located in the museum's room 17 "L'art français du XIXe siècle". This work was shown at the Paris Salon of 1833 and was a variation of the work "La Jeune Chasseresse" shown at the Paris Salon of 1824. In the 1830 work, the young "huntress" holds up a hare.
Bust of Georges Cuvier	Dole Musée des Beaux-arts	1833	A work in plaster of this French scientist. Jean Léopold Nicolas Frédéric Cuvier, known as Georges Cuvier, was a French naturalist and zoologist who was a major figure in natural sciences research in the early nineteenth century and was instrumental in establishing the fields of comparative anatomy and paleontology through his work in comparing living animals with fossils. The bust was shown at the Paris Salon of 1834.
Gaston, Duke of Orléans	Blois; Musée du château de Blois	1838	A marble statue commissioned in 1838. Pradier had produced a plaster version in 1836
Charles-Marie Denys de Damrémont	Versailles, Châteaux de Versailles et de Trianon	1838-1839	A statue in marble of the Comte de Damrémont
Anne de Montmorency Connétable de France (1493–1567)	Versailles, châteaux de Versailles et de Trianon and Rennes Musée des beaux-Arts	1839	A work in marble depicting the soldier, statesman and diplomat who became a Marshal of France and Constable of France can be seen at Versailles whilst the original plaster model is held in Rennes.
"Odalisque"	Musée des Beaux-arts de Lyon	1841	Odalisque In the time of the Ottoman Empire an "odalik" was a woman who lived in the sultan's harem. The version in the Lyon museum is in marble but the piece was subsequently cast in bronze in two sizes. A statuette of the same subject was executed by Pradier and was shown at the Paris Salon of 1841.
"La Prière"	Montargis, Musée Girodet	1842	A work in bronze cast by the foundry Susse. A woman kneels in prayer.
"Cassandra"	Avignon Musée des Beaux-Arts	1843	A work in marble.
François Juste Raynouard	Bibliothèque de l'Institut de France.	1845	A bust of the permanent secretary of the French Academy.
Statue of Louis-Marie de Belleyme	Sceaux; Musée de l'Île-de-France	1848	A work in white marble depicting the French politician.
Jean Reboul	Musée des Beaux-Arts de Nîmes	1849	Jean Reboul bust Bust of the Nîmes poet. Reboul was known as the "Baker of Nîmes".
"L'Enfant au Cygne"	Ny Carlsberg Glyptotek Copenhagen	1849	This work is in bronze.
"Junon, Vénus et Minerve"	Valenciennes, Musée des Beaux-Arts	Date execution not known	A work in terra cotta.
Napoléon	La Roche-sur-Yon; Musée municipal	Date execution not known	There are a huge number of statuettes of Pradier's work in circulation. Here we have a bronze statuette of Napoleon
"Phryné"	Grenoble; Musée des Beaux-Arts.	1845	A work in Paros marble depicting Phryne was submitted to the Paris Salon of 1845. The Louvre hold a bronze version of the work which was cast in 1845. See photograph below.
Bust of Jules Canonge	Nîmes. Musée d'art et d'histoire.	1848	A bust in bronze. The Musée de Narbonne and the Musée de Montpellier hold plaster casts of the work.
"La Poésie légère"	Nîmes Musée des beaux-arts	1846	This work in Carrara marble was shown at the Paris Salon in 1846. The piece was subsequently cast in bronze, one such casting being carried out by the Delafontaine Foundry. One of these castings can be seen in New York's Metropolitan museum of art.
Bust of Caroline Hamard née Flaubert.	Rouen; Musée Flaubert & d'Histoire de la Médecine.	1846	Based on a death mask of Caroline who was Gustave Flaubert's sister.
"Chloris caressée par Zéphir"	Musée des Augustins Toulouse	1847	A work in marble shown by Pradier at the 1849 Paris Salon. The sculptor takes as his theme Greek mythology and Chloris's abduction by Zephyrus one of the Anemoi
Bust of Achille-Cléophas Flaubert	Musée Flaubert. Rouen	1847	The father of Gustave Flaubert
"La Toilette de Nyssia"	Montpellier Musée Fabre	1848	Shown at the 1848 Paris Salon and awarded a "médaille de première classe" the highest award possible. Pradier was said to have been inspired by Théophile Gautier's "Roi Candaule".The work is in marble from Mount Pentelicus
"Ulysse enlevant le corps d'Achille"		1848	
Bust of General Guillaume Henri Dufour	Angers; Musée des beaux-arts	1849	Dufour was much involved with the reorganisation of the Swiss army in 1835 and was the founder of the École miltaire de Thun.
"Pandore"	Musée de Nîmes	1845-1860	There are many versions about of this work. A marble version is to be seen in Belgium with bronzes held in Geneva and Nîmes. Shown at the 1850-1851 Paris Salon
Bust of Jacques-Luc Barbier-Walbonne	Musée des Beaux-Arts de Nîmes	1850	Bust shown at Paris Salon 1850–1851.
Bust of Francois Marius Granet	Château de Versailles	1851	A work in marble depicting the French painter.
"Hébé et l'aigle"	Rennes Musée des beaux-arts	Date execution not known	A rare example of Pradier working in terracotta. He depicts Hebe the Greek goddess of youth in her role of cupbearer to the gods serving ambrosia to the eagle who was Jupiter's personal messenger and animal companion.
Bust of Morgane Lecareux	Blois; Musée du château de Blois	Various	This museum hold Pradier's plaster bust of Morgane Lecareux and his statues of Molière and Corneille. The museum also hold a plaster bust of Louis Philippe and a marble statue of Gaston d'Orléans.
"Leda"	Angers Musée des Beaux-Arts	1850 approx.	This is the only known work by Pradier in ivory. Léda the wife of the King of Sparta is depicted as a nymph and Jupiter, who is trying to seduce her, takes the form of a swan. The union of Leda and Jupiter was to result in the birth of Castor and Pollux as well as Helen of Troy.
Bust of Jean Pierre Joseph d'Arcet	Château de Prunay. Louveciennes	1845	D'Arcet was Pradier's father-in-law and a member of the Académie des Sciences. Pradier entered a statuette of d'Arcet, executed in 1834, to the 1835 Paris Salon and executed a marble version for the Institute in 1845. A replica of the bust but in bronze was placed on d'Arcet's tomb in Paris' Père Lachaise cemetery and a bronze version of the statuette was cast by Gonon in 1834.
"L'amour et psyche"	Bourg-en-Bresse	Date execution not known	This plaster statuette is held by the musée de Brou.
Bayadère	Chantilly Musée Condé	Date execution not known	A bronze statuette originally held in the Tuileries and acquired by the Chantilly museum in 1886.
"Tête de femme implorant"	Arbois Musée Sarret de Grozon	Date execution not known	A work in plaster of a woman's head turned upwards in prayer.

== Works located in Geneva ==
After he finished his studies at the École de Dessin in Geneva and went up to Paris, the authorities in Geneva, aware of his talent, organised bursaries for him in 1809 and 1812 to help defray his expenses at the École des Beaux-Arts and to perhaps help cement this relationship he sent his Prix de Rome winning entry of 1813 to the city. However, when in 1815 he tried to get the Geneva authorities to help finance the execution of a marble version of the composition "Orphée pleurant Eurydice" which they turned down, he perhaps realised that assistance from Geneva would be of a limited nature. He did however keep contact with friends and associates there and in 1819 the "Sociéte des Arts" in Geneva made him a "associé honoraire" and in that year they gave Pradier an order for two of the busts being commissioned to decorate the front of the "Orangerie du Jardin botanique" just created by A.P.de Candolle for the "Promenade des Bastions". Pradier was asked to execute the bust of Jean Jacques Rousseau in 1821 and Charles Bonnet in 1822. In 1825 he was asked to execute two further busts to decorate the Musée des Beaux-Arts just being built thanks to the generosity of the Rath family. 1830 saw the project to establish a monument honouring Rousseau come to fruition, Pradier's bronze being one of his best known works. In 1843 Pradier received private commissions to execute busts of the economist Jean Charles Léonard de Sismondi and Abraham Auguste Saladin de Budé. A commission for the bust of Augustin-Pyramus de Candolle followed in 1845 and Pradier captured interest by producing a cylindrical pedestal for this with remarkable reliefs. This was also intended for the "Jardin botanique des Bastions". Pradier's final sculpture executed for Geneva was the bust of Guillaume-Henri Dufour.

After Pradier's death the Musée de Geneve acquired several original plaster models and a large number of his design drawings. Over time, the museum's collection increased to a total of more than 120 reliefs, statues and statuettes, and design drawings.

Other works by Pradier are to be seen in Switzerland and details are given below. Pradier also sent to Geneva four medallions to be added to the Frédéric-César de La Harpe monument at Rolle on the Ile de la Harpe.

Name	Location	Date	Notes
"Néoptolème empêche Philoctète de percer Ulysse de ses flèches"	Geneva, Musée d'art et d'histoire	1813	Pradier had joined the Paris École des beaux-arts after studying at Geneva's École de dessin and studied under François-Frédéric Lemot. He stayed at the school from 1811 to 1813. In 1813 he won the coveted Prix de Rome with this bas-relief in plaster. It depicts Neoptolemus preventing Philoctetes (Sophocles) from shooting an arrow at Ulysses. Other works executed by Pradier in this period are thought to have been destroyed. Winning the Prix de Rome meant that he was able to study in Rome at the Académie de France and he studied there from 1814 to 1818. He returned to Rome for lengthy stays in 1823-24 and 1841–42,
Bust of Jean Jacques Rousseau	Geneva, Musée d'art et d'histoire	1821	This bust in white marble was originally ordered for Geneva's botanical garden and "La promenade des Bastions" but is now held in the museum.
Bust of Charles Bonnet	Geneva, Musée d'art et d'histoire	1822	The Swiss Société des Arts commissioned Pradier to execute a marble bust of the Swiss botanist and the work was submitted to the 1822 Paris Salon. It was originally placed on the façade of the "orangerie" in Geneva's botanical garden before being brought into the museum.
Général Simon Rath	Geneva, Musée d'art et d'histoire	1825	A bust of the main benefactor of the Musée Rath in Geneva. Served with the Russian Imperial Army
"Venus à la coquille"	Geneva, Musée d'art et d'histoire	1838	Having executed a statuette entitled "La Naissance de l'Amour" which depicted Venus in a scallop shell, shortly afterwards Pradier made his "Vénus à la coquille", which added two dolphins to the composition. The Geneva art museum hold a plaster version of the latter.
Jean-Jacques Rousseau	Ile Rousseau	1838	In 1830 the sculptor was asked to execute a sculpture of Jean-Jacques Rousseau for a monument on the newly constructed Île Rousseau. This piece was Pradier's first major bronze and the cause of much anxiety as well as a financial loss of 12,000 francs due to the technical difficulties he encountered during the casting process. Pradier depicts Rousseau sitting on a chair and in thoughtful mood. His left hand holds a book whose text is "Émile si la vie et la mort de Socrate sont d'un sage, la vie et la mort de Jesus sont d'un Dieu." (If the life and death of Socrates are those of a wise man, the life and death of Jesus are those of a God), a quote from Rousseau's Émile ou De l'éducation of 1762. The statue's inauguration took place on 24 February 1835, although the inscription on the pedestal gives the year as 1838.
Decorative funeral urn	Geneva, Musée d'art et d'histoire	1840	At the "Statues de Chair" exhibition the Geneva Musée d'art et d'histoire also displayed a decorated funeral urn. The highly decorated urn was shown at the Paris Salon of 1840, the only work Pradier submitted that year.
"Polyphème, Acis et Galatée"	Geneva, Musée d'art et d'histoire	1841	The Geneva museum held a plaster model of this dramatic composition but it was lost in a fire in 1987. However the museum do hold a bronze version, which was cast in 1910 from the original plaster model. Pradier executed this work whilst in Rome from 1841 to 1842 and at one time there were moves to use the work as a centre-piece for a fountain in Geneva but this did not come to fruition. Pradier's theme is the violent jealousy of Polyphemus and is based on Ovid's Metamorphoses, the sculptor depicting the scene where the giant cyclop Polyphemus, having spied on the love-making of Acis and Galatea (mythology), crushes Acis with a rock in a fit of violent anger and jealousy.
Bust of Augustin Pyrame de Candolle	Geneva. Musée d'Art et Histoire.	1843	Bronze bust of the Swiss botonist on a cylindrical pedestal with bronze reliefs of the four seasons with their Greek names. Between Spring and Summer is an eagle with a key - the symbol of Genève - and two putti. Between Autumn and Winter is an identical eagle with a statue of Athena, flanked by two putti, one of them holding a book, the other writing on the socle of the statue. In 1910 the bust was moved into the museum from its location in Geneva's Conservatoire et jardin botanique and in 1913 a bronze replica was erected in its place.
"Homer et son guide"	Geneva, Musée d'art et d'histoire.	1852	The Geneva museum hold the plaster model of this work and a plaster "esquisse" dating to 1851 is held in Aix-en-Provence's Musée Granet. The work was never shown in Paris and was acquired by the city of Geneva in 1852 and held in the Musée Rath until transferred to the Musée d'art et d'histoire where it was lost in the 1987 fire.
Nymphe de la fontaine (Bacchante)	Place du Cirque Geneva	1852	Only in 1976 was this work cast in bronze and placed in Geneva's Place du Cirque.

== Miscellaneous ==
Name	Location	Date	Notes
La Mort d'Epaminondas	Whereabouts not known	1815	Although whereabouts of this relief not known the Musée des beaux-arts in Angers have a copy of the sculptor's preparatory drawing signed and dated "Roma. J. Pradier 1815".
"Centaure et Bacchante"	Whereabouts not known.	1819	As well as submitting "Bacchante" to the 1819 Salon, Pradier also submitted this work in plaster.
"L'Amour captif"	Whereabouts not known.	1822	
Bust of Marc-Auguste Pictet	Present whereabouts not known	1825	Bust was commissioned by the Swiss Société des Arts for the Geneva botanical gardens
Bust of Charles X	Destroyed	1827	Bust shown at Paris Salon of 1827. The bust was destroyed during July 1830 insurrection.
"Cyparisse et son cerf"	See note	1833	A work in marble shown at the Paris Salon of 1833. Destroyed in 1871 when fire engulfed the Château de Saint-Cloud during the Franco-Prussian war. A plaster model is held in Bourges's Musée du Berry
"Vénus et l'Amour"	Whereabouts not known	1836	Shown at the Paris Salon of 1836.
Auguste Bessas de la Mégie	Held in a private collection	1836	A bronze of one of Paris' mayors, cast by Honoré Gonon and his two sons. It was de la Mégie who officiated at Pradier's wedding to Louise d'Arcet. The sculpture was presented to the Paris Salon in 1837.
"Danaïde"	Whereabouts not known	1852	
"Médée"	Whereabouts not known	Date execution not known	Shown at Paris Salon 1850–51.
"Anacréon at l'Amour"	Whereabouts not known	1844-1845	Shown at the Paris Salon of 1846.
"La Sagesse repoussant les traits de l'Amour"	Whereabouts not known	1844-1845	Shown at the Paris Salon of 1846.

== Gallery of images ==
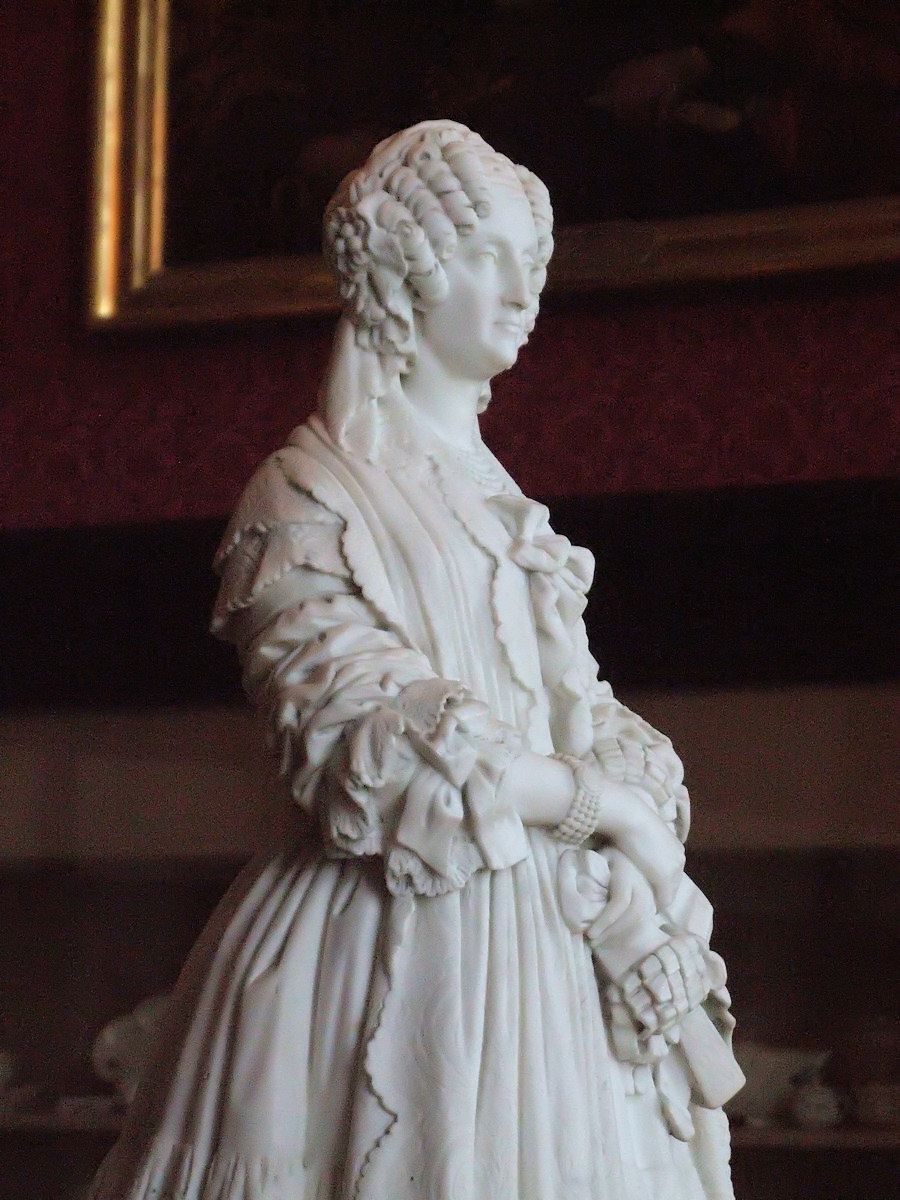
Marie-Amélie (1782–1866) wife of King Louis-Philippe.

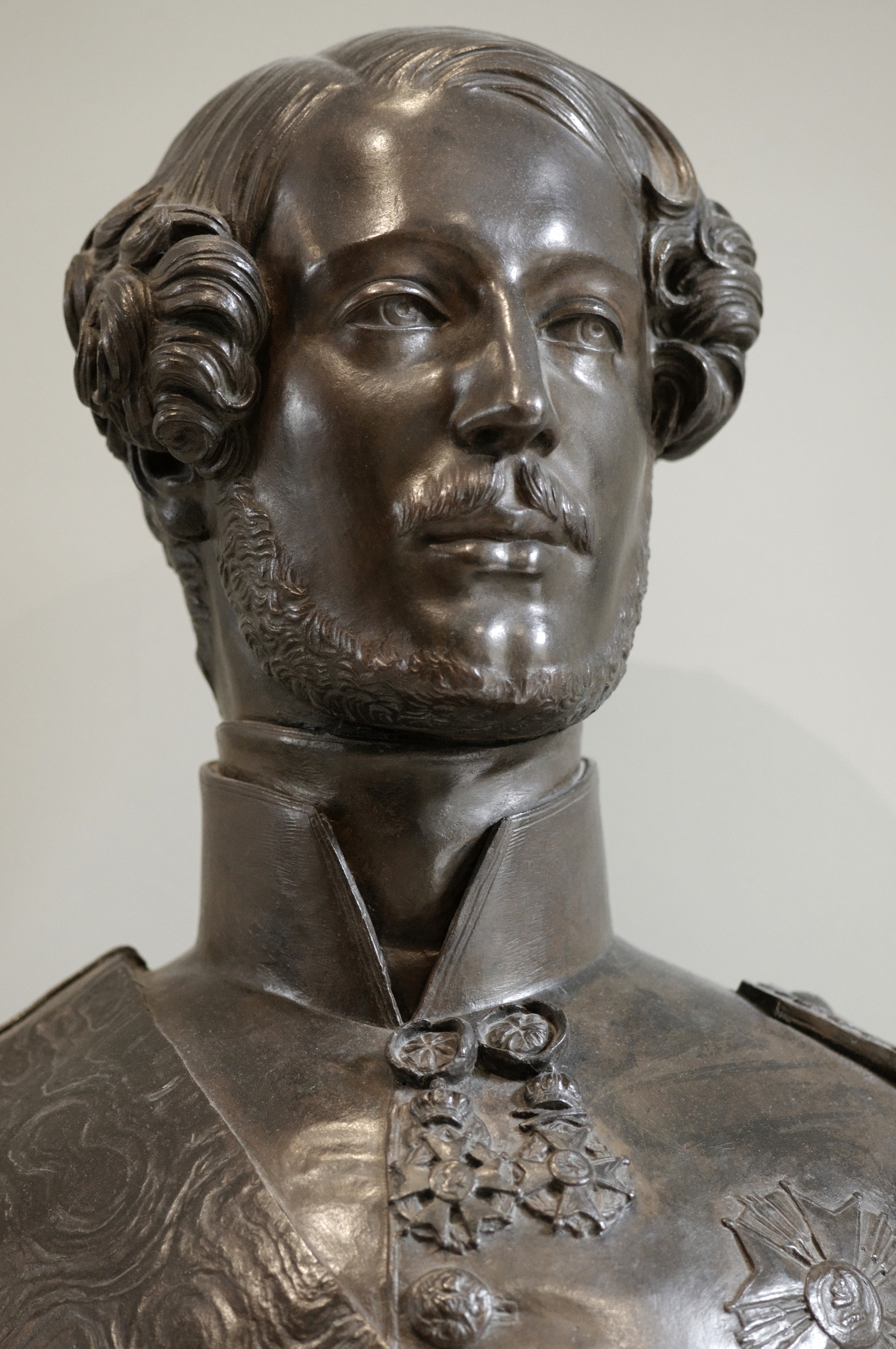
Bust of Prince Ferdinand Philippe, Duke of Orléans (1810–1842), son of Louis Philippe I. Cast in bronze by Eugène Gonon

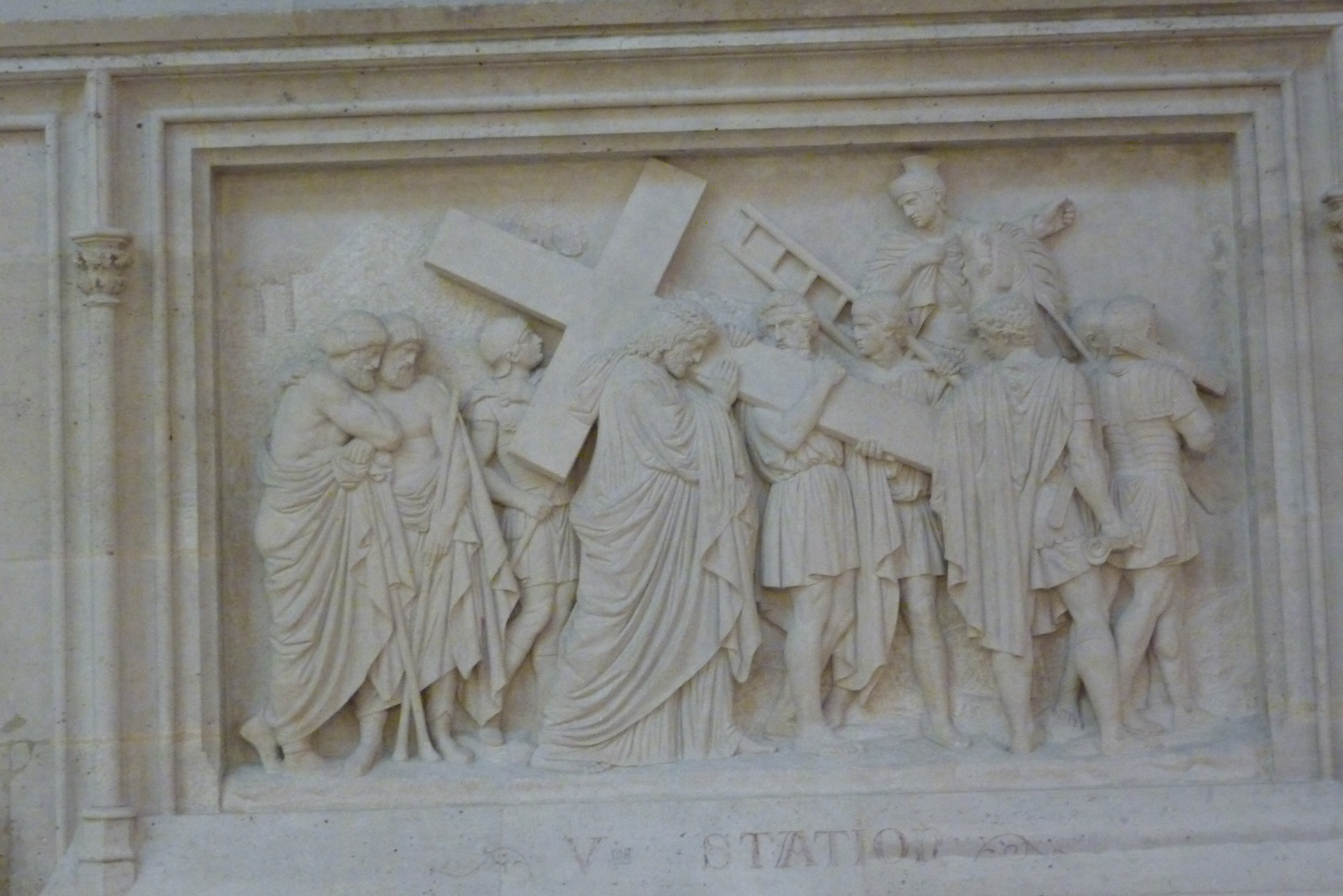
Simon de Cyrène helps Jesus carry the Cross. One of the Stations of the Cross in St.Clotilde's church.

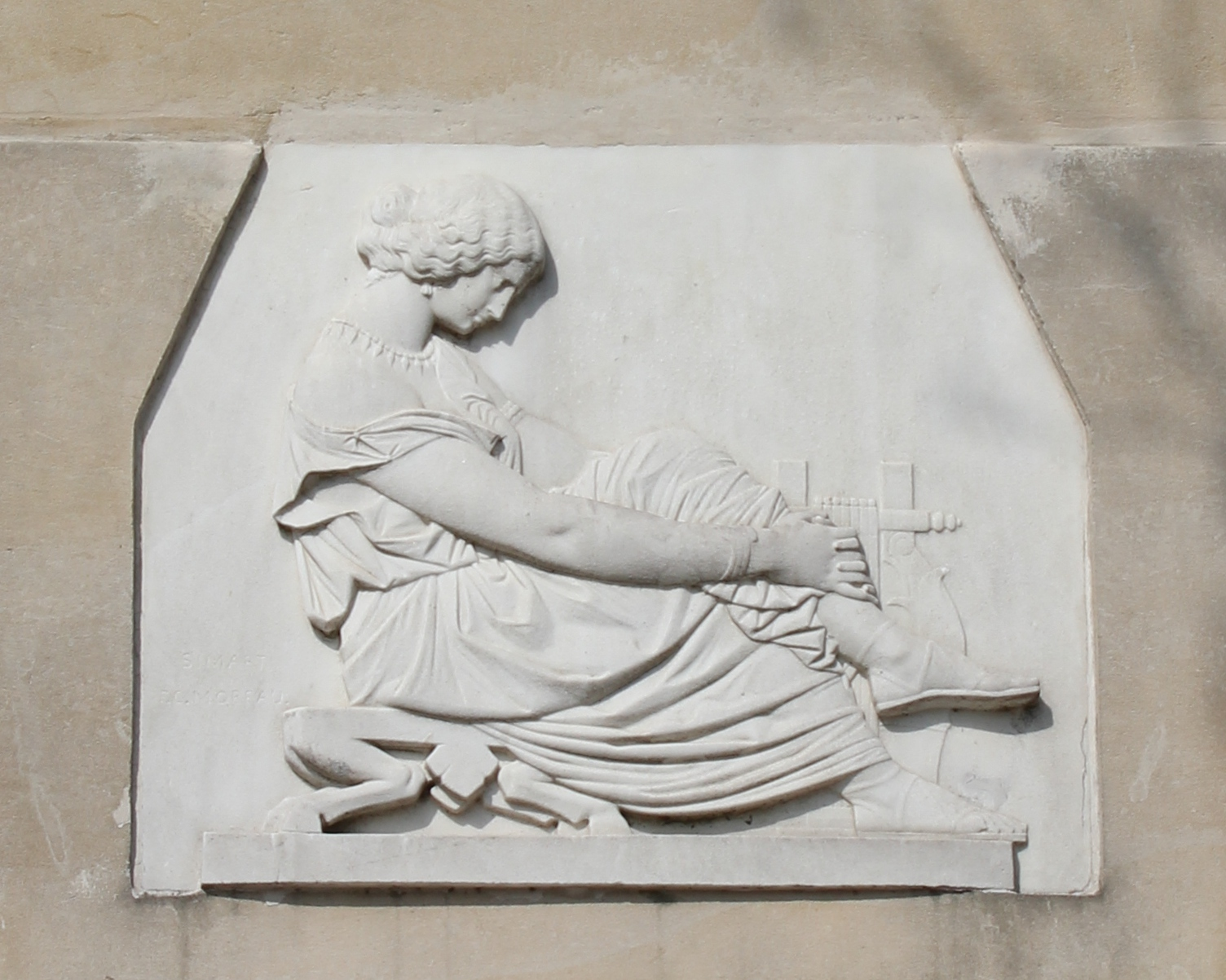
A relief on Pradier's tomb based on his 1852 composition "Sapho"' and by the sculptor Pierre-Charles Simart.

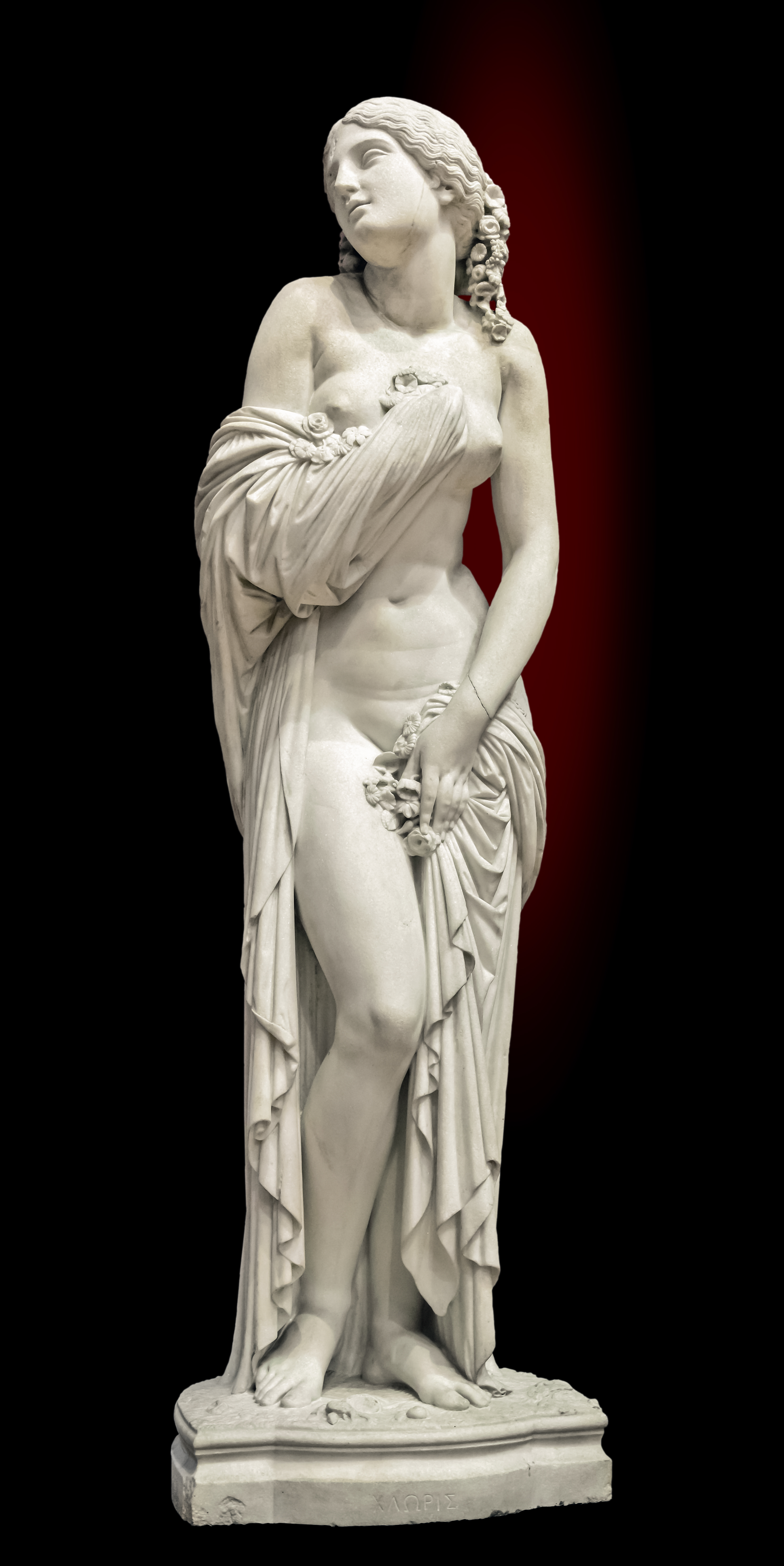
Chloris caressée par Zéphir.

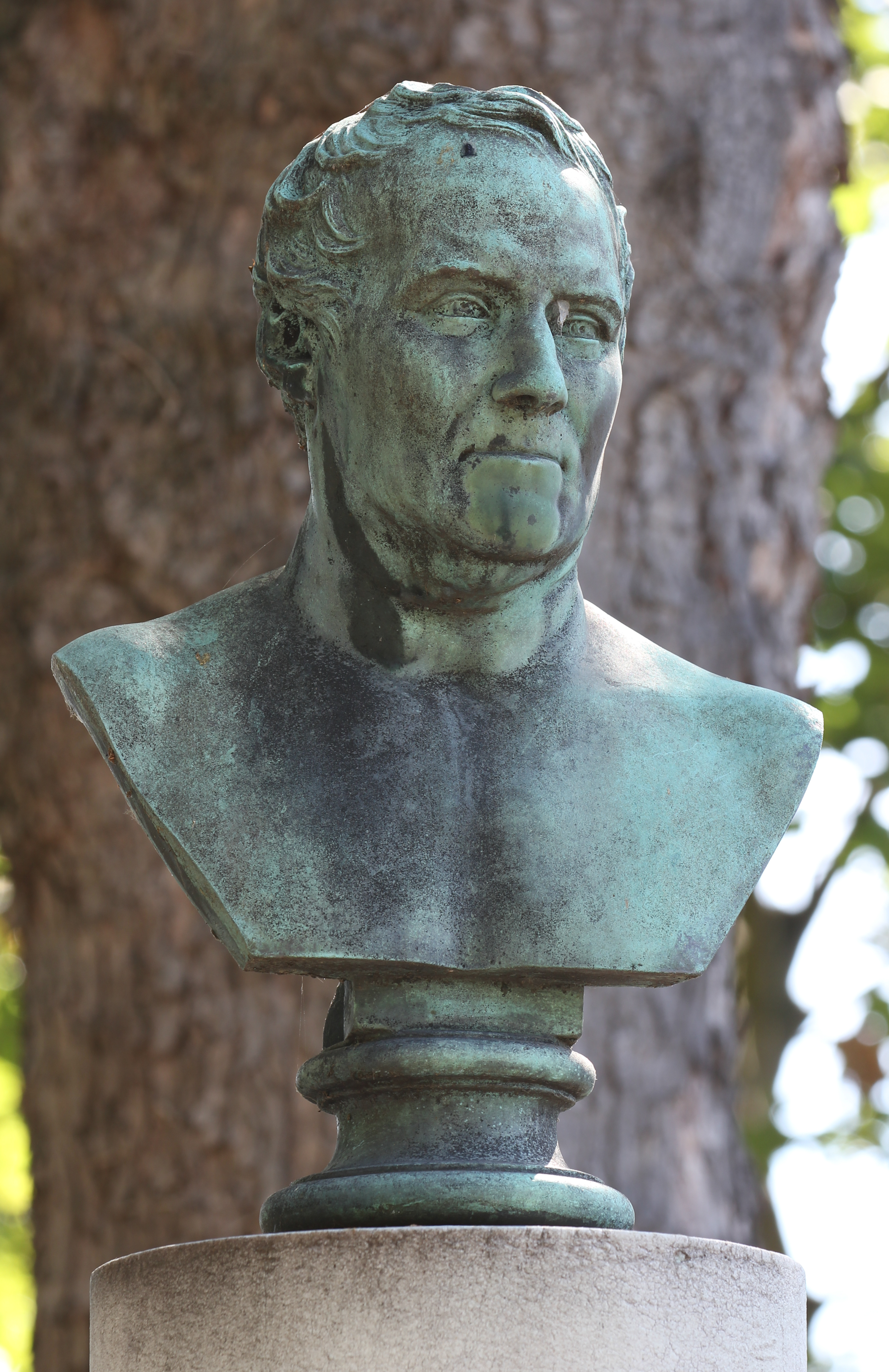
Bust of Jean-Pierre-Joseph d'Arcet (1777–1844)

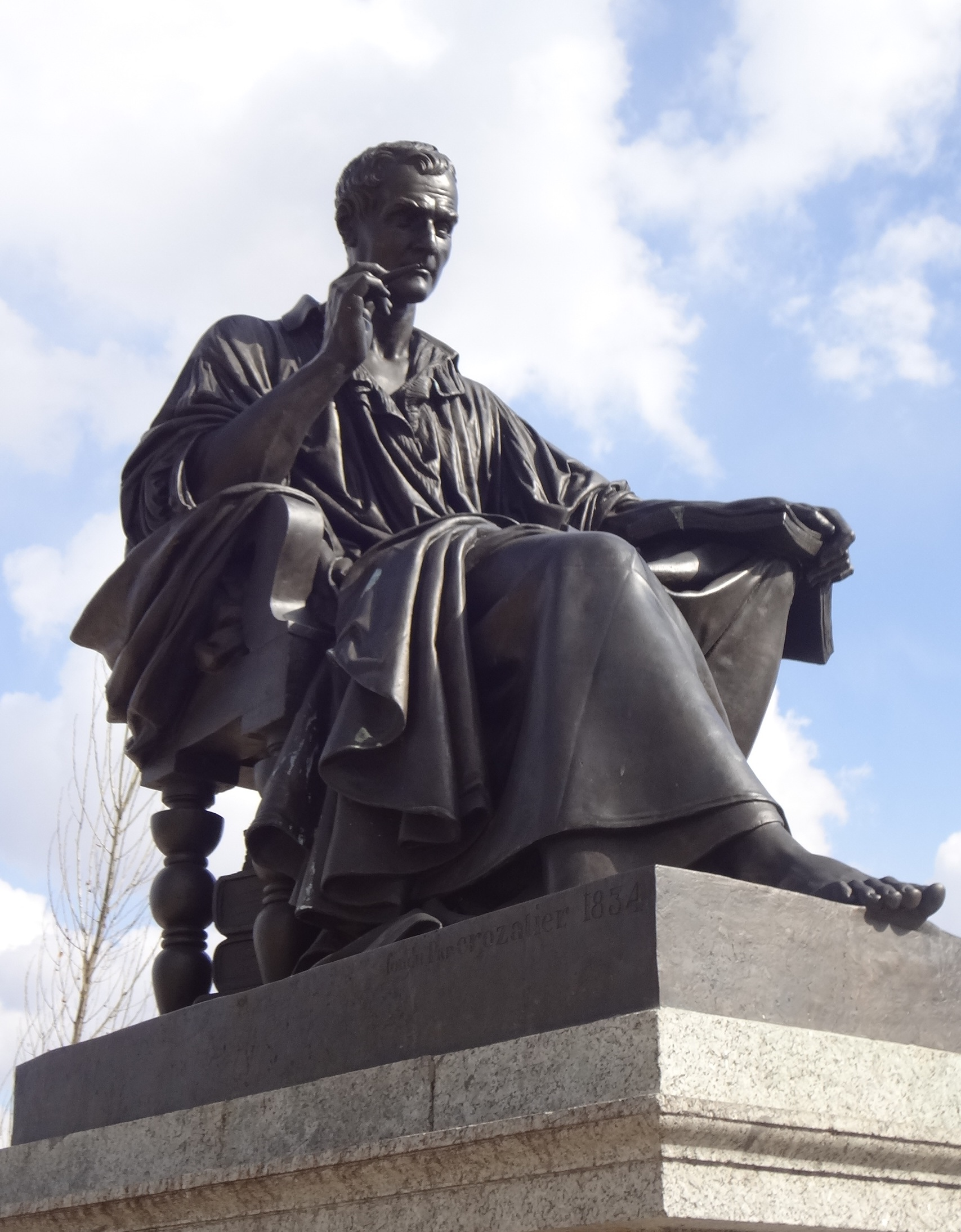
Rousseau's statue in Geneva

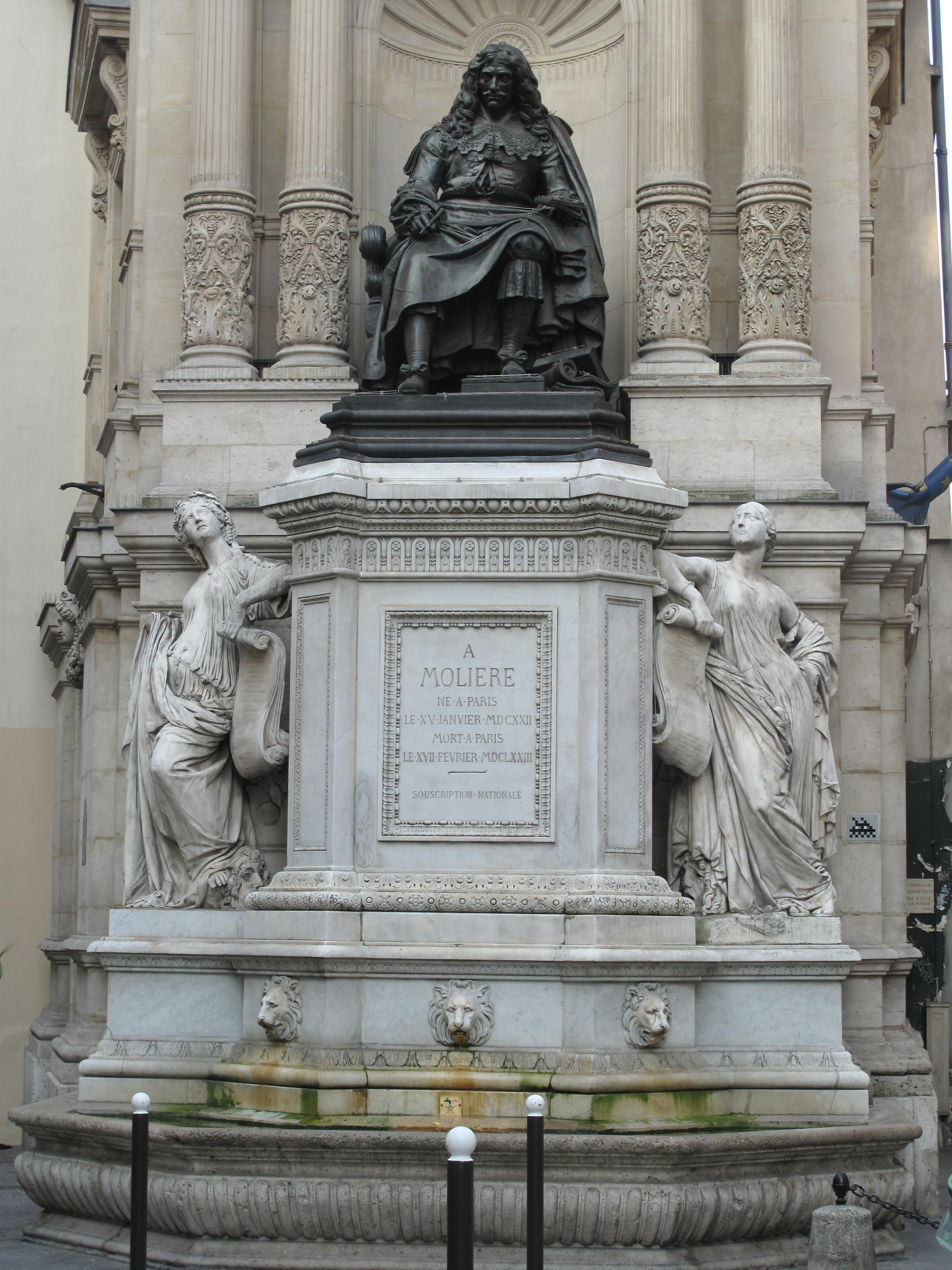
Fountaine Molière-The statue of Molière.

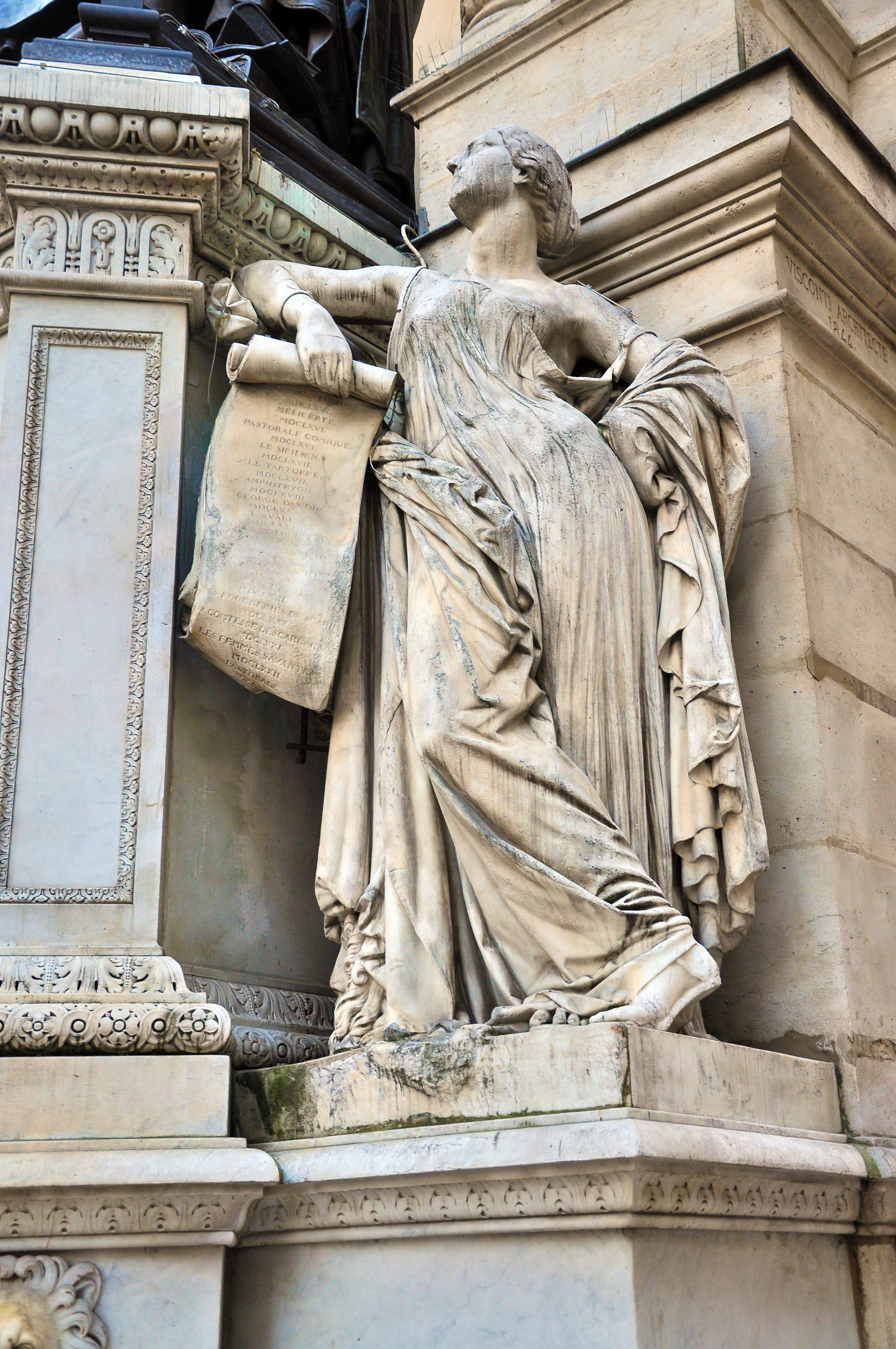
"Light Comedy". Statue by Pradier on the Fountaine Molière.

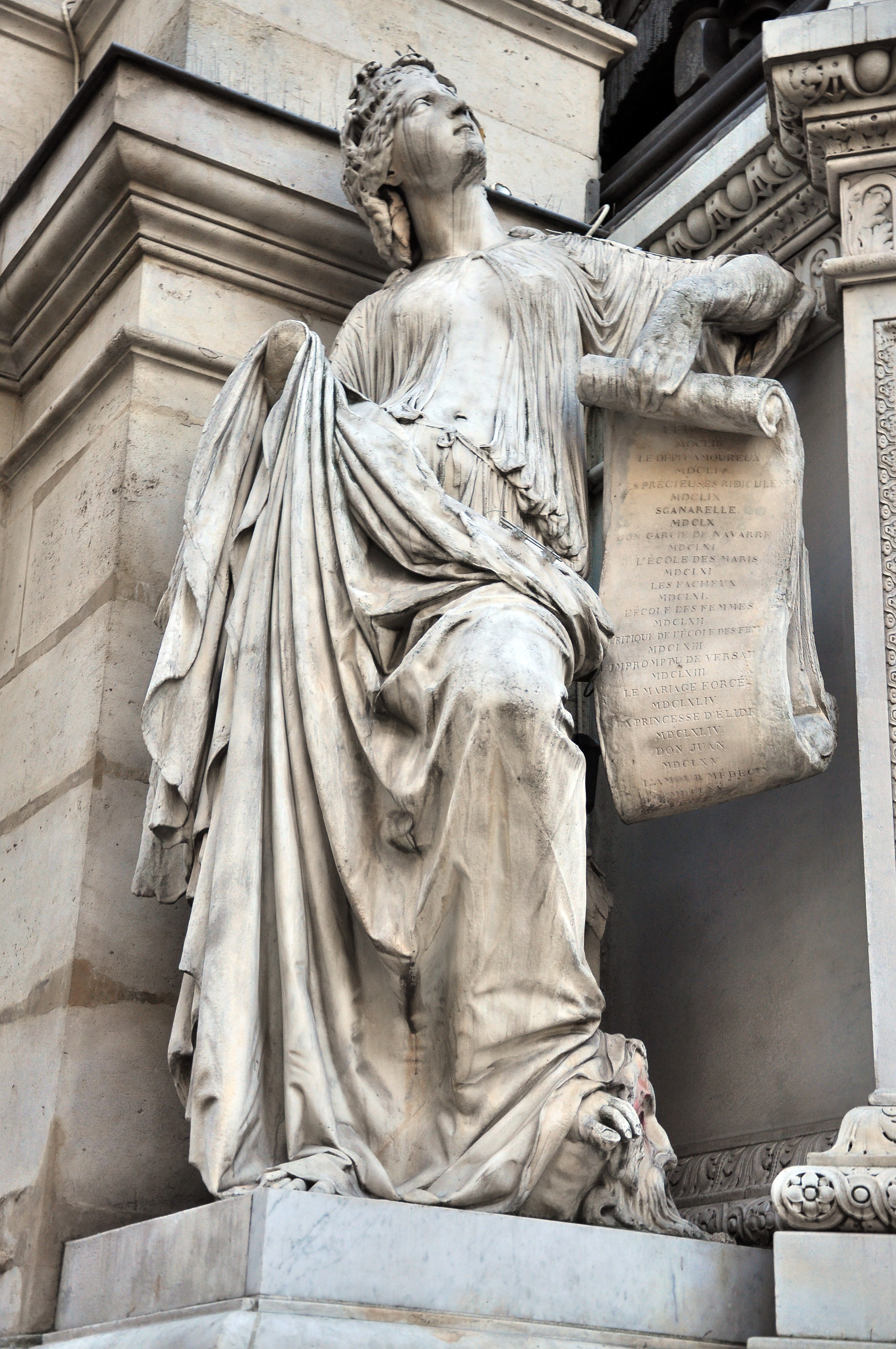
"Serious Comedy". Statue by Pradier on the Fountaine Molière.

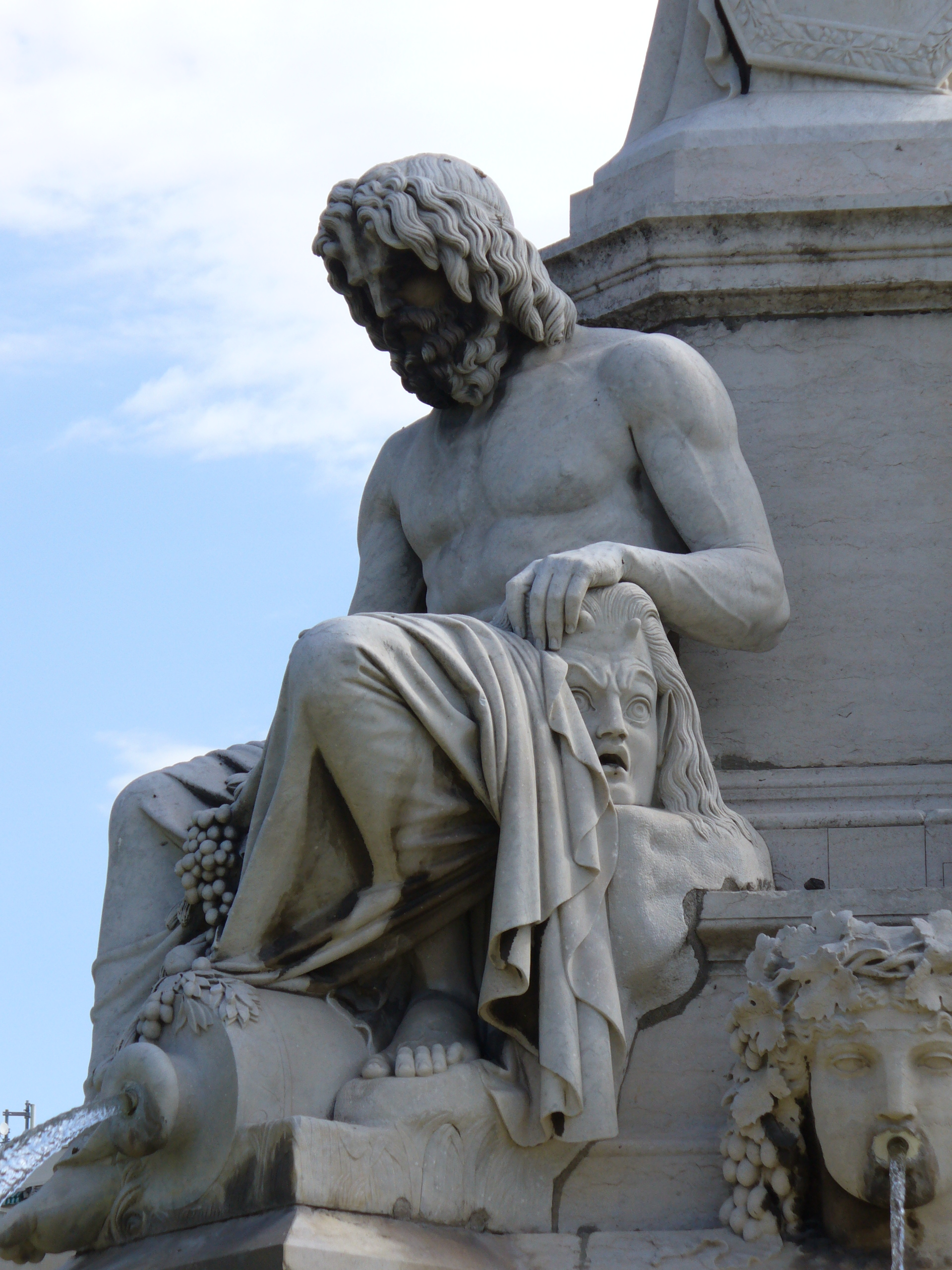
Fontaine Pradier.

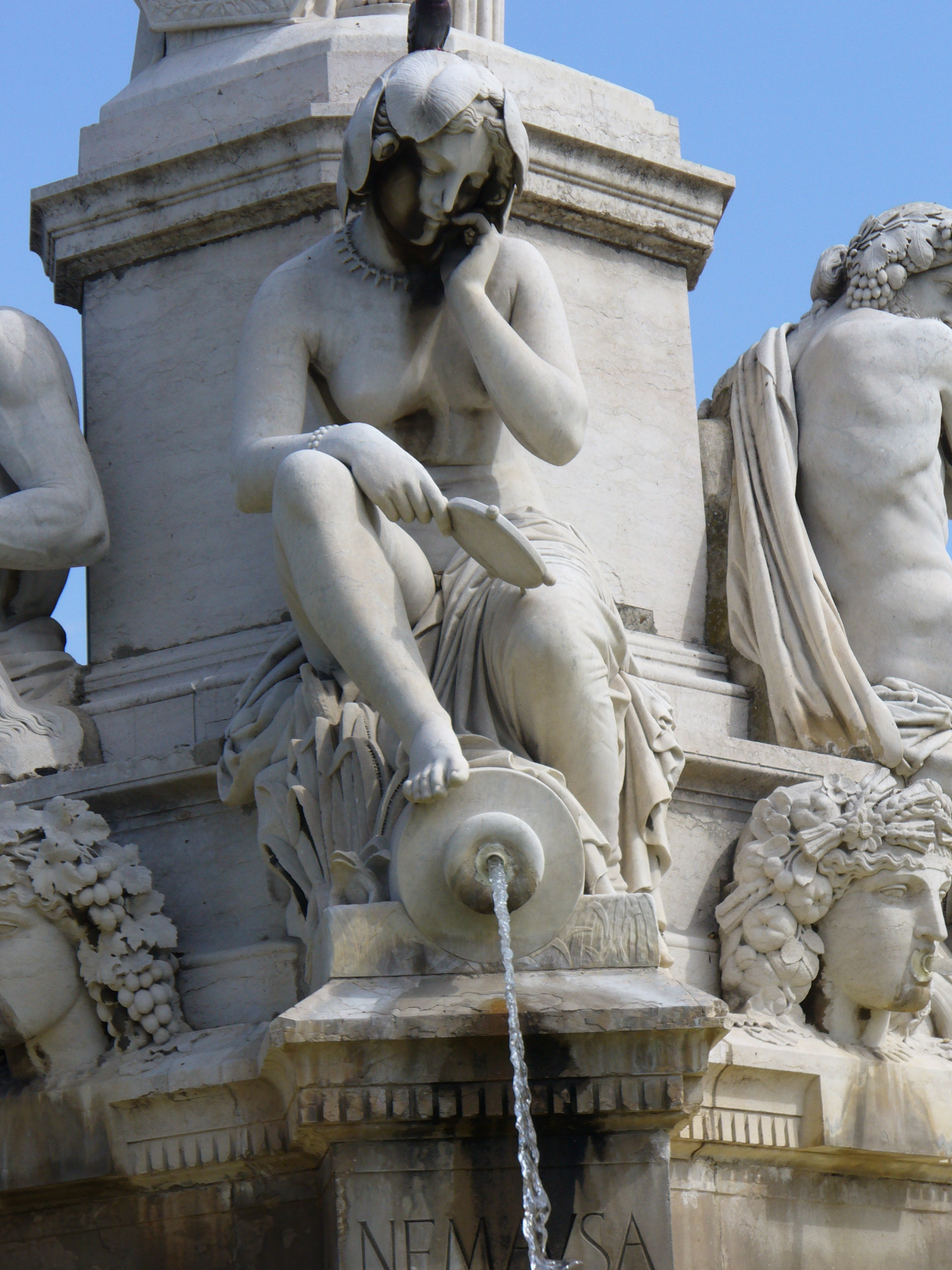
Fontaine Pradier.

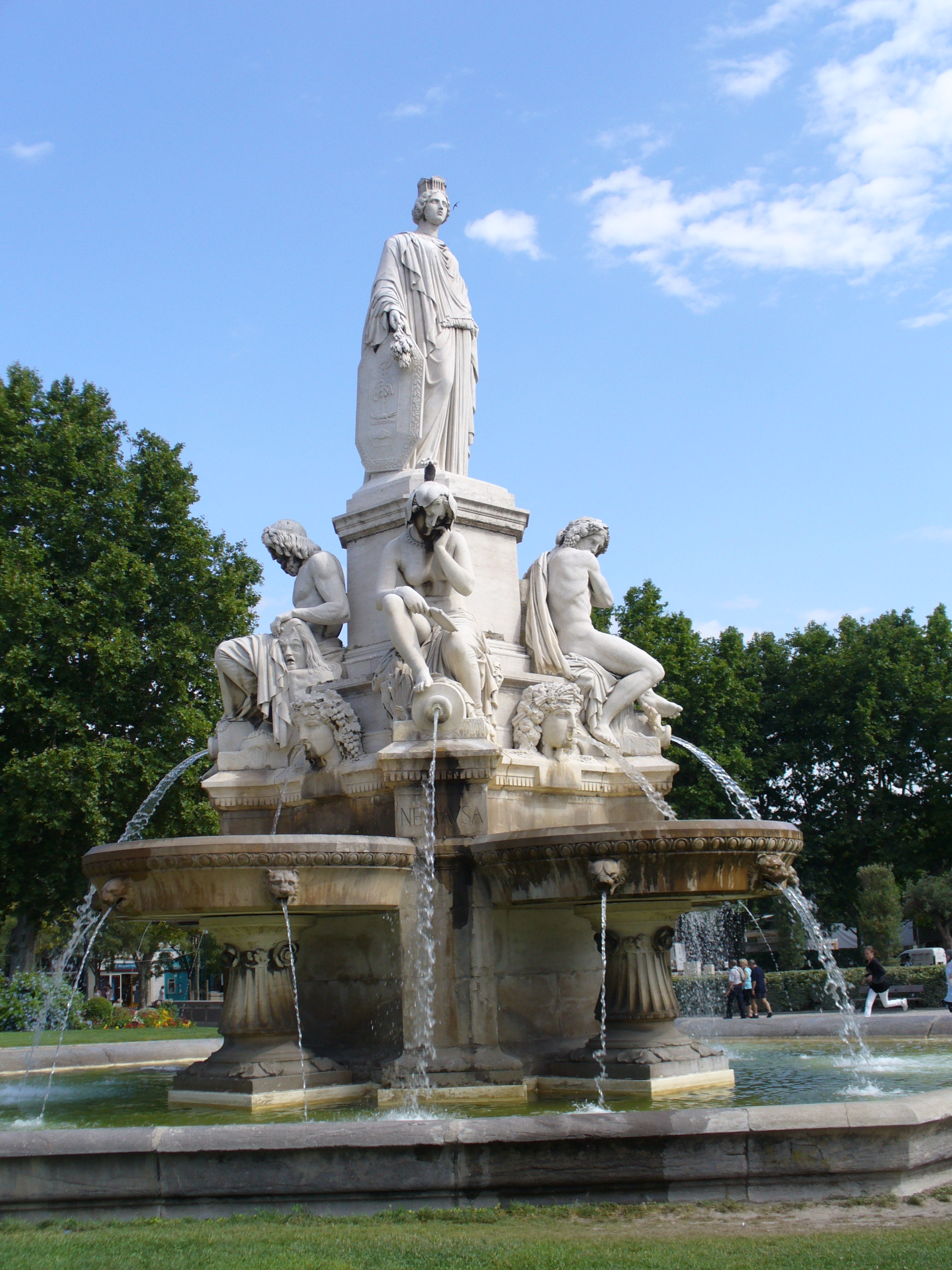
Fontaine Pradier.

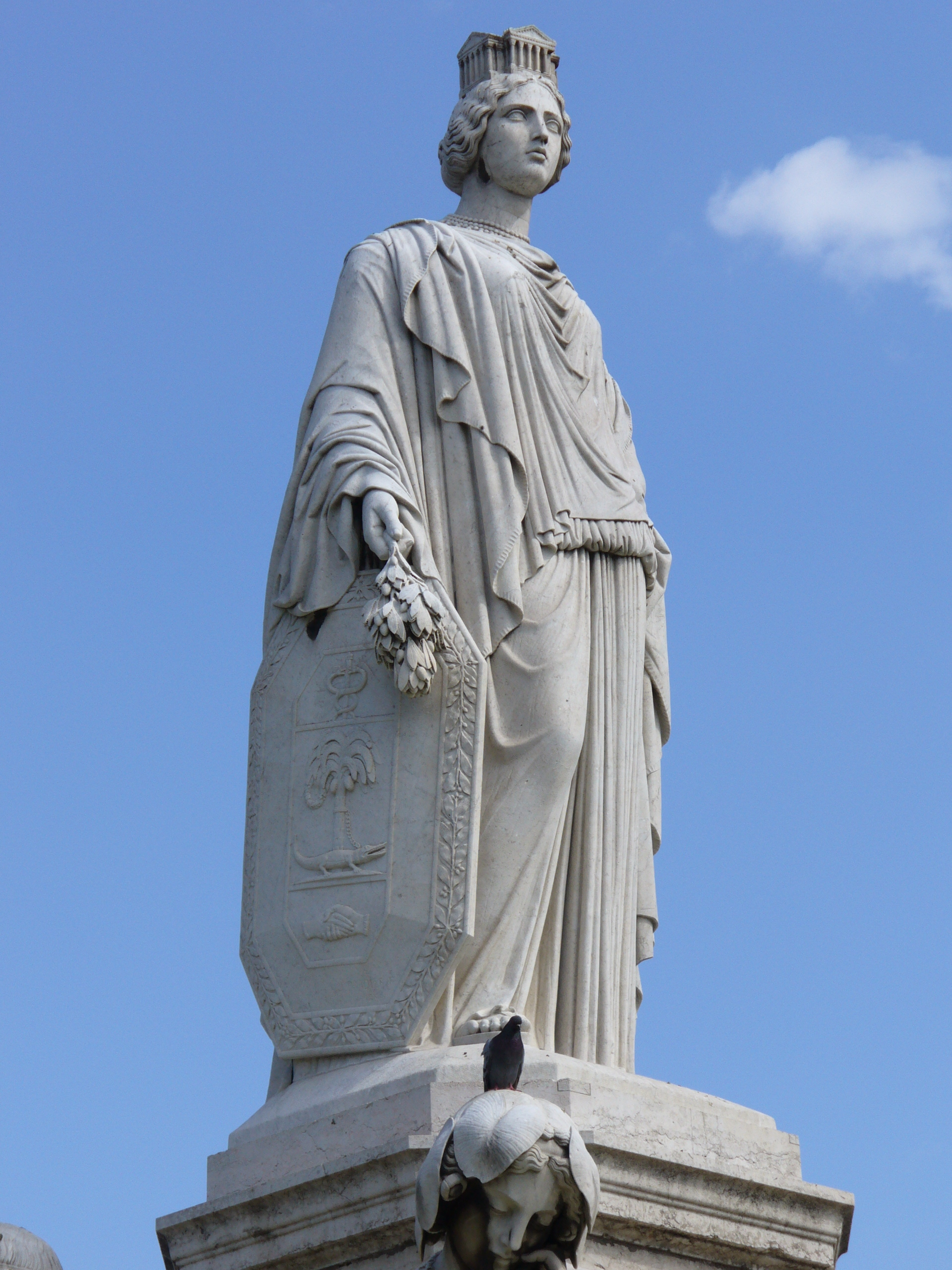
The Fontaine Pradier. The allegory of Nîmes.

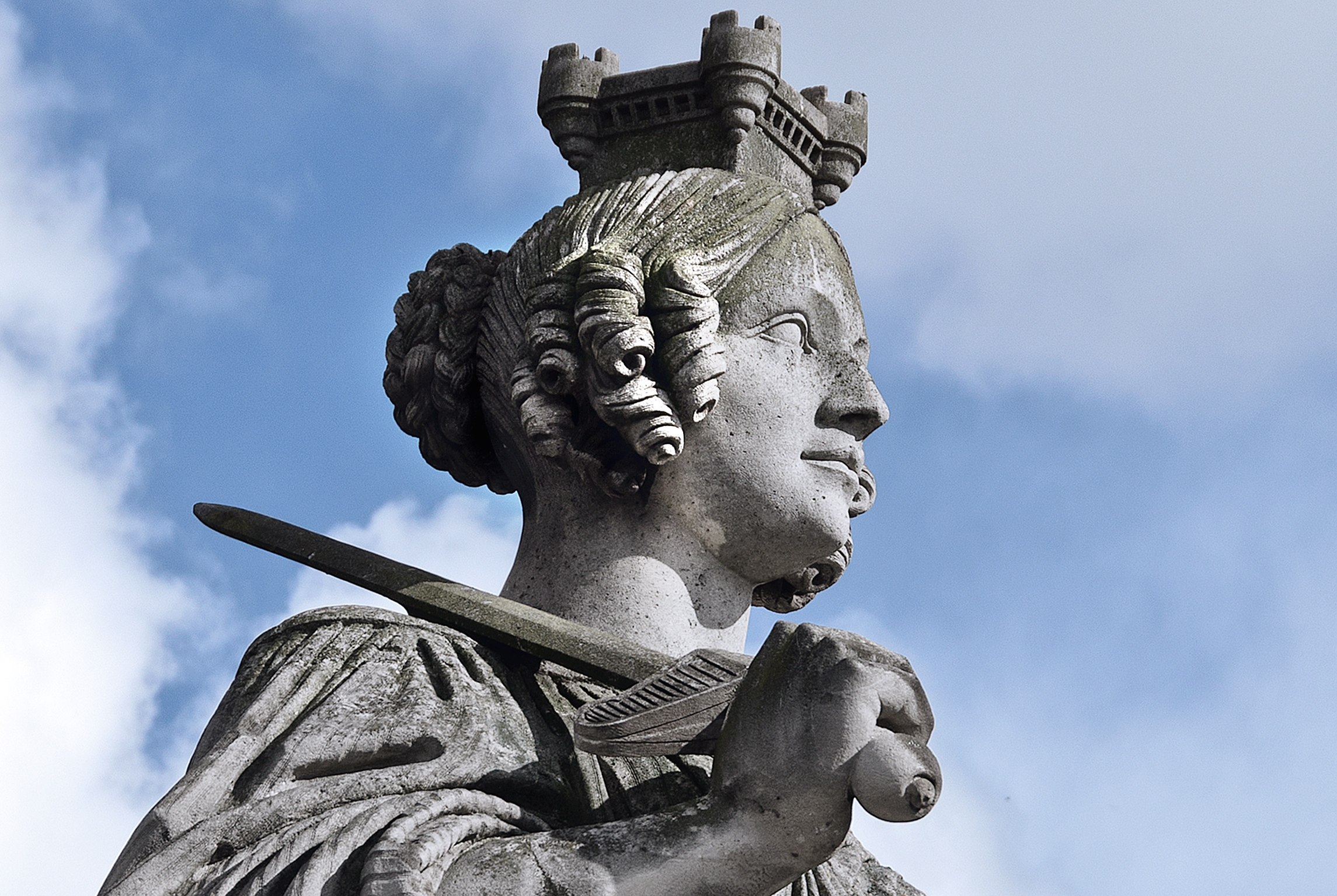
Statue representing Lille in the Place de la Concorde.Paris

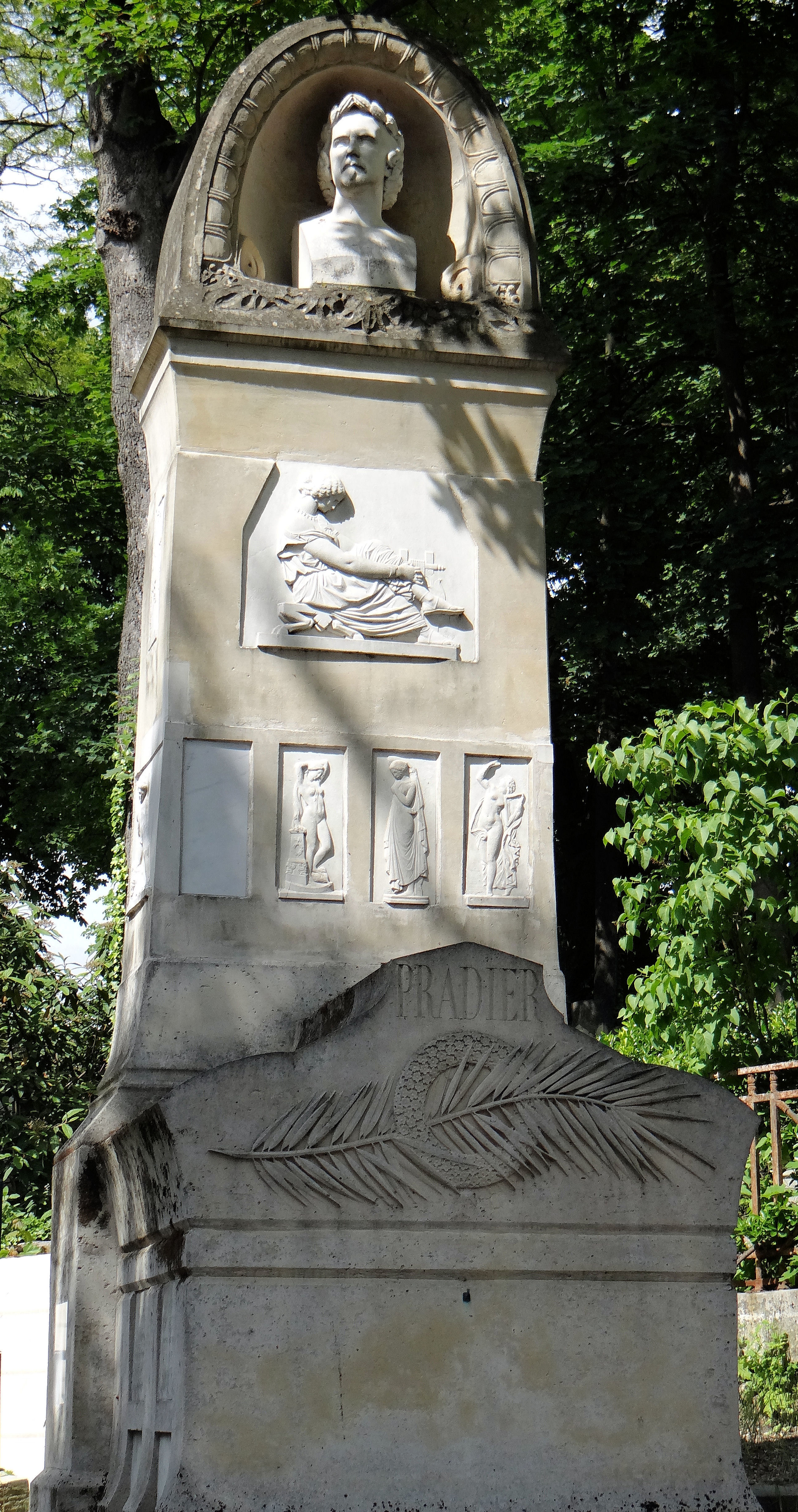

== The tomb of James Pradier ==
The Pradier family tomb was designed by the architect Antoine Martin Garnaud and comprises a large sarcophagus above which is a tall pedestal at the top of which is a niche containing a marble bust of Pradier by Eugène-Louis Lequesne and below this there are a series of bas-reliefs representing some of Pradier's best known works, executed by former pupils of Pradier, these being "Cyparisse" by Hippolyte Ferrat a work presented to the Paris Salon in 1833, "Niobide blessé" by Jacques Léonard Maillet, "Psyché" by Eugène Guillaume, "Nyssia" by Augustin Courtet, "La Poésie légère" by Félix Roubaud, "Pélion" by François Clément Moreau and "Phryné" by Antoine Étex. The monument was inaugurated in 1857. For a full description of the grave and details of the theft of three of the reliefs see "Étude :Le tombeau de Pradier au cimetière du Père-Lachaise" by Douglas Siler.
