= Moncé =

Moncé may refer to:

- Moncé-en-Belin, a commune in the Sarthe department, France
- Moncé-en-Saosnois, a commune in the Sarthe department, France
- Moncé-lez-Amboise, site of a château and former nunnery, today in Limeray, France

== See also ==
- Moncey (disambiguation)
