= Moncey, Doubs =

Moncey
- Commune
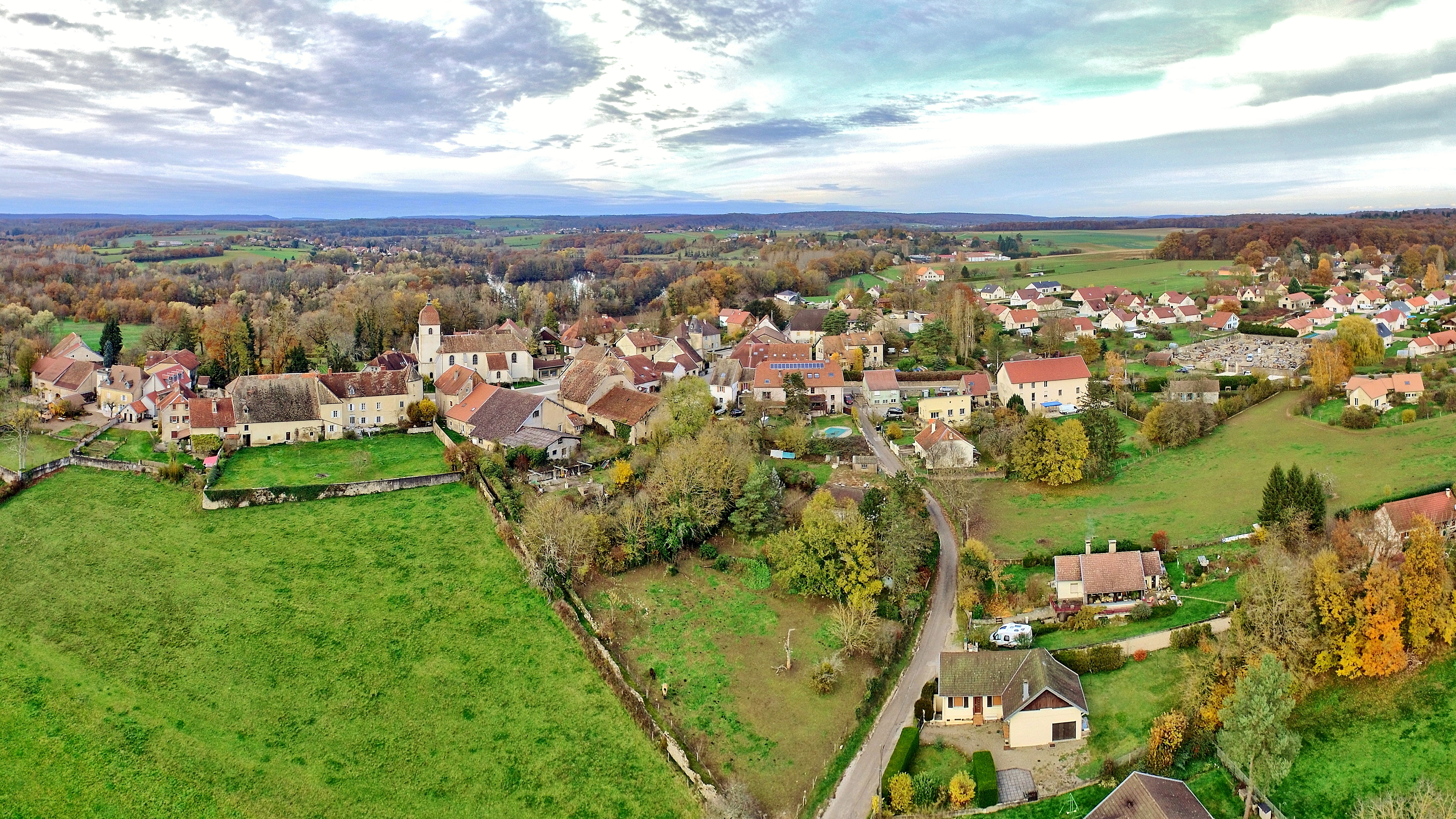

- Coat of arms
- Location of Moncey
- Location within France Location within Bourgogne-Franche-Comté
- Coordinates: 47°21′47″N 6°07′14″E
- Country: France
- Region: Bourgogne-Franche-Comté
- Department: Doubs
- Arrondissement: Besançon
- Canton: Baume-les-Dames

Government
  - Mayor (2020–2026): Fabien Thernier
- Area^{1}: 5.0 km^{2} (1.9 sq mi)
- Highest elevation: 446 m (1,463 ft)
- Lowest elevation: 219 m (719 ft)
- Population (2023): 610
  - Density: 120/km^{2} (320/sq mi)
- Time zone: UTC+01:00 (CET)
  - Summer (DST): UTC+02:00 (CEST)
- INSEE/Postal code: 25382 /25870
- ^{1} French Land Register data, which excludes lakes, ponds, glaciers > 1 km^{2} (0.386 sq mi or 247 acres) and river estuaries.

Moncey (French pronunciation: [mɔ̃sɛ]) is a commune in the Doubs department in the Bourgogne-Franche-Comté region in eastern France.

== History ==
In the 18th century, Bon-Adrien Jeannot de Moncey built the château du maréchal Moncey.

== Geography ==
Moncey lies 8 km (5.0 mi) north of Marchaux in the valley of the Ognon. It is surrounded by woods.

== Population ==
Historical population
Year	Pop.	±% p.a.
1968	233	—
1975	217	−1.01%
1982	349	+7.02%
1990	363	+0.49%
1999	379	+0.48%
2007	469	+2.70%
2012	506	+1.53%
2017	579	+2.73%
2023	610	+0.87%
Source: INSEE

== See also ==
- Communes of the Doubs department
