= Bon-Adrien Jeannot de Moncey =

French marshal (1754–1842)

Marshal of the Empire Bon-Adrien Jeannot de Moncey duc de Conegliano
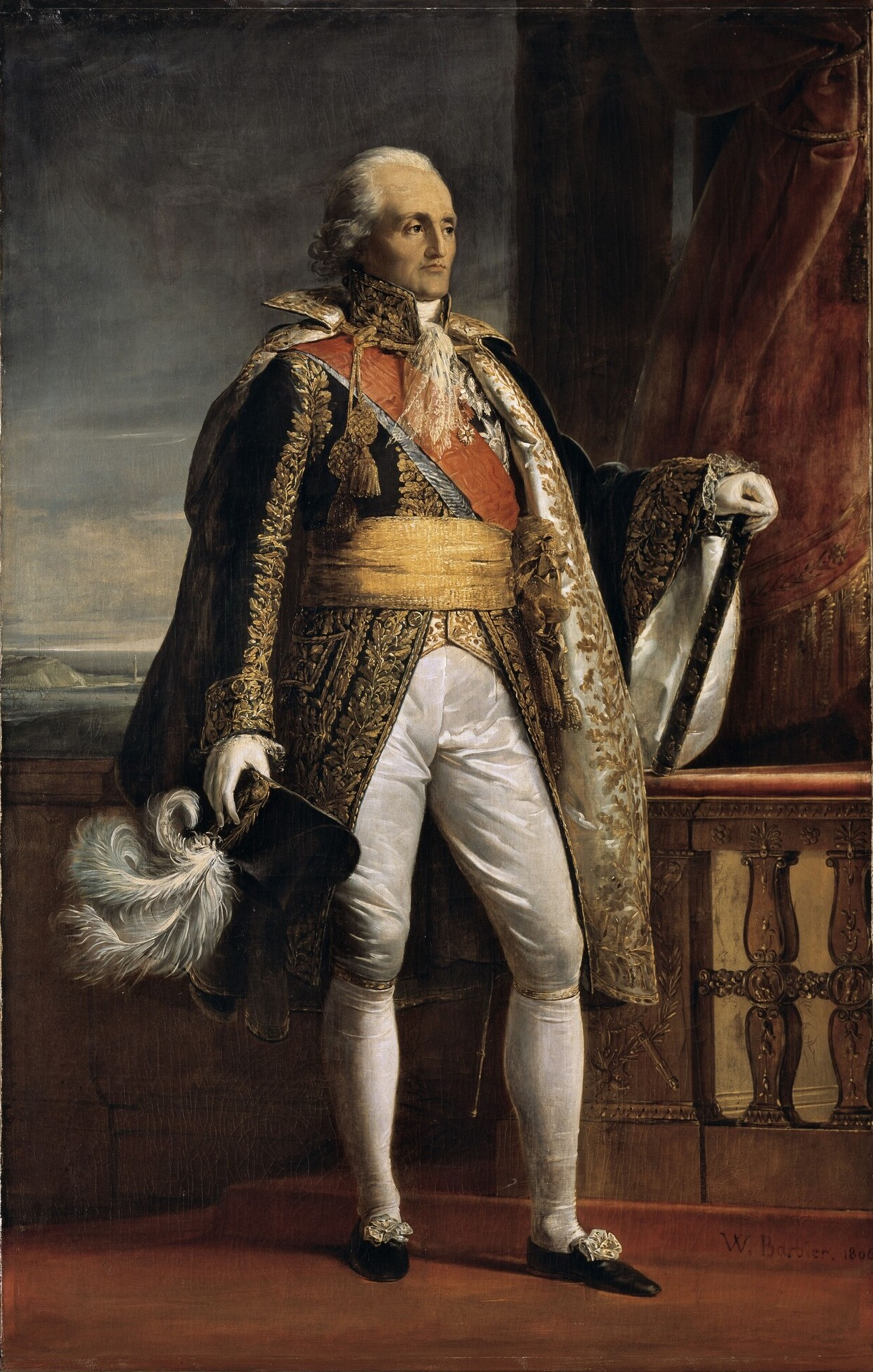
- Portrait by Jacques-Luc Barbier-Walbonne (1806)
- Born: 31 July 1754; Moncey, Franche-Comté, Kingdom of France
- Died: 20 April 1842 (aged 87); Paris, Kingdom of France
- Spouse: Charlotte Prospère Remillet (m. 1790)
- Children: 3
- Military career
- Allegiance: Kingdom of France; Kingdom of the French; French First Republic; First French Empire; Bourbon Restoration; July Monarchy
- Branch: French Army
- Service years: 1774–1814; 1816–1823
- Rank: Marshal of the Empire
- Units: Army of the Western Pyrenees
- Conflicts: French Revolutionary Wars; War of the First Coalition; War of the Pyrenees; Napoleonic Wars; Peninsular War; Battle of Valencia; Siege of Zaragoza; War of the Sixth Coalition; Battle of Paris
- Other work: Governor of Les Invalides

Bon-Adrien Jeannot de Moncey (or Jannot de Moncey), 1st duc de Conegliano (English: /ʒɑːˈnoʊ də mɒnseɪ/ zhah-NOH-duh-mon-SAY, French: [bɔn‿adʁijɛ̃ ʒano də mɔ̃sɛ]; 31 July 1754 – 20 April 1842) was a French military officer and a prominent commander in the French Revolutionary Wars and later a Marshal of the Empire during the Napoleonic Wars. He later became governor of the Hôtel des Invalides. Moncey is one of the names inscribed under the Arc de Triomphe, on Column 33.

== Early life ==
Moncey was born on 31 July 1754 in Palise or Moncey, Doubs. His father was a lawyer from Besançon. During his childhood, he twice enlisted in the French Army, but his father procured his discharge on both occasions. His desire to be in the army was at last gratified when he received a commission in 1778.

== Career ==
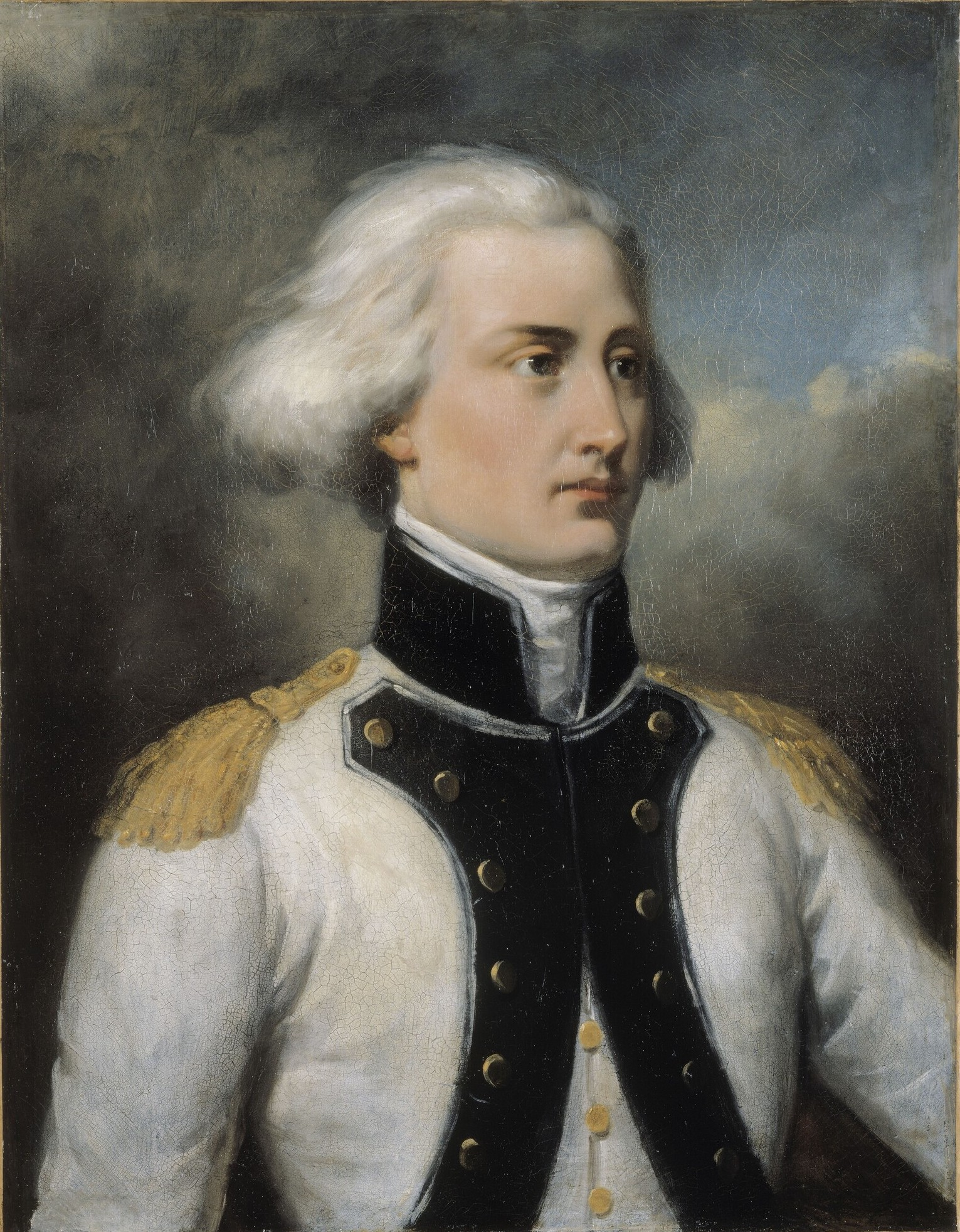
Moncey as a captain of the 7th Line Infantry Regiment in 1792, by Dedreux-Dorcy (1834)

Moncey was a captain when, in 1791, he embraced the principles of the French Revolution. He won great distinction in the campaigns of 1793 and 1794 during the War of the Pyrenees, rising from the commander of a battalion to the commander-in-chief of the Army of the Western Pyrenees in a few months. His successful operations were instrumental in compelling the Spanish government to make peace. After this, he was employed in the highest commands until 1799, when the government, suspecting him of being a royalist, dismissed him.

The coup d'état of 18 Brumaire in 1799 brought Moncey back to the active list, and during Napoleon's Italian campaign of 1800, he led a corps from Switzerland into Italy, surmounting all the difficulties of bringing horses and guns over the formidable Gotthard Pass. In 1801, Napoleon made him inspector-general of the French Gendarmerie, and on the assumption of the imperial title, made him a Marshal of the Empire. In 1805, Moncey received the Grand Cordon of the Legion of Honour.

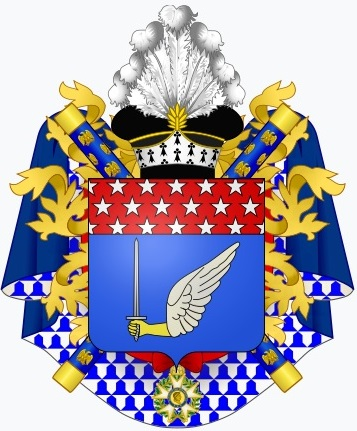
Heraldic achievement of Bon-Adrien Jeannot de Moncey, Duke of Conegliano

In July 1808, Moncey was made duc de Conegliano ("Duke of Conegliano"); it was a duché grand-fief, a rare hereditary honor. The title was later confirmed under the Bourbon Restoration, and, since he had no surviving son, Moncey was granted permission to pass it to his son-in-law (with his newly granted title of "Baron of Conegliano" and Peer of France).

=== Peninsular War ===
In late 1807 Moncey entered Spain at the head of the Corps of Observation of the Ocean Coast, part of France's first Army of Spain, whereafter he occupied the area around Madrid. After the Dos de Mayo Uprising and the beginning of the Peninsular War he advanced on Valencia to put down the revolt there, but he was unable to take the city. Moncey then took a leading part in the emperor's campaign on the Ebro and in the Siege of Saragossa in 1809.

=== War of the Sixth Coalition (March 1813 – May 1814) ===
He refused to serve in the invasion of Russia, and therefore had no share in the campaign of the Grande Armée in 1812 and 1813. However, when France was invaded in 1814, Moncey reappeared in the field and fought the last battle for Paris on the heights of Montmartre and at the barrier of Clichy.

In 1814, he supported Louis XVIII and was made a Peer of France as "Baron of Conegliano" (confirmed in 1825). He remained neutral during Napoleon's return to power, feeling himself bound to Louis XVIII by his engagements as a Peer of France, but after Waterloo he was punished for refusing to take part in the court martial of Marshal Michel Ney; by imprisonment and the loss of his marshalate and peerage.

== Bourbon Restoration, July monarchy, and the last years ==
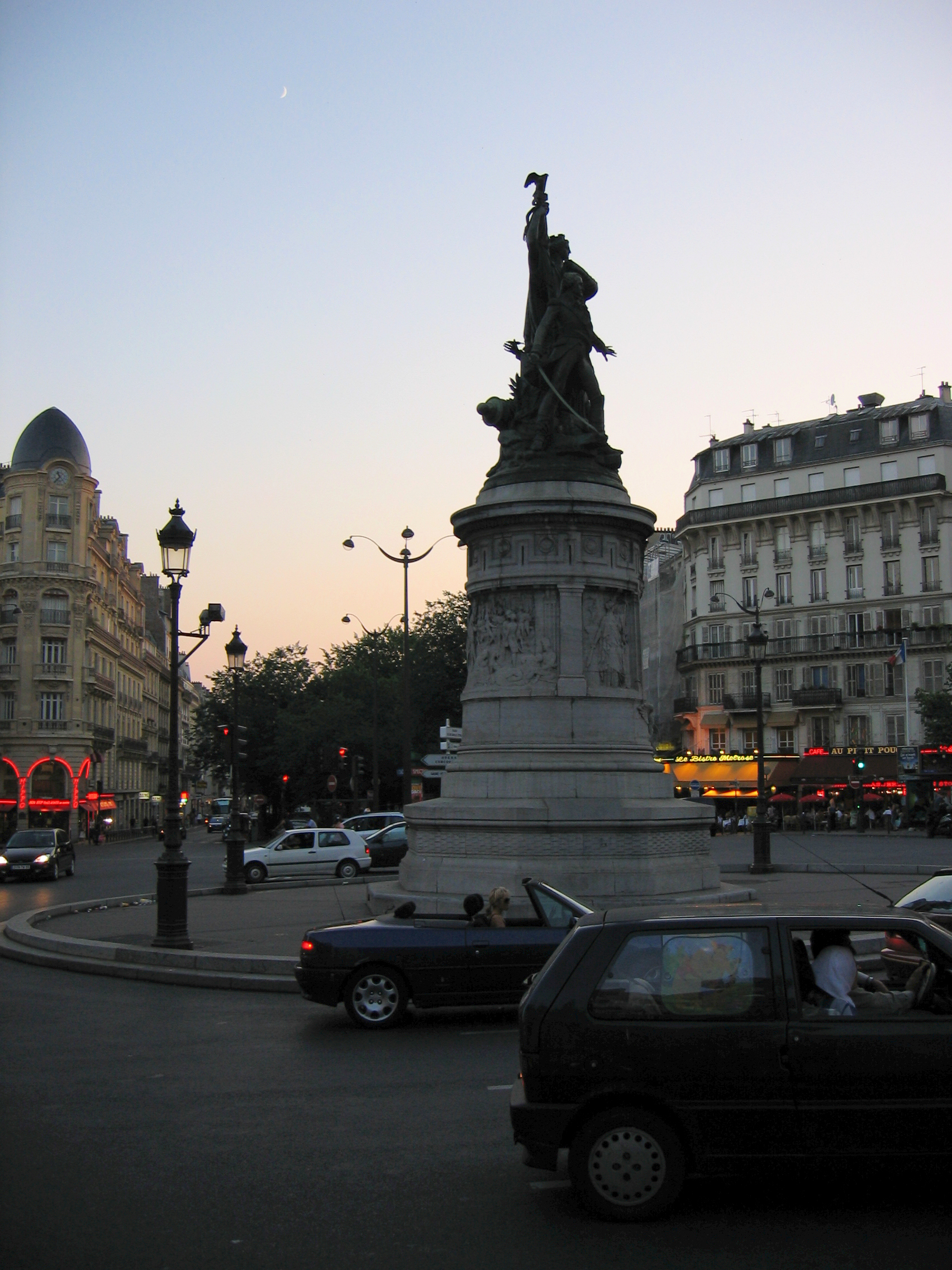
Monument to Moncey, by Amédée Doublemard, at the Place de Clichy in Paris

In 1816, Moncey was given back his title of marshal by the king and he re-entered the Chamber of Peers three years later. He continued his military career as his last active service was as commander of an army corps of the Hundred Thousand Sons of Saint Louis in 1823. From 1833 to 1842, Moncey was governor of the Hôtel des Invalides (a home for veterans in Paris).

By the 1830s Moncey was among the last marshals of the first empire, and on 15 December 1840 Napoleon's funeral was to take place after his mortal remains were brought back to France. The 86-year old marshal, gravely ill, and barely able to move, wanted to pay a final tribute to the emperor. Already seriously ill before the arrival of the coffin, he begged his doctor to provide him with just enough drugs and medicine to be able to attend the emperor's funeral, saying, "Doctor, make me live a little longer, I want to honour the Emperor". He was brought to the altar in a wheelchair, awaiting the arrival of Napoleon's corpse. When the emperor was brought in, Moncey tried to get up but, weakened, fell back onto his wheelchair. He was brought to the coffin, kissed the hilt of Napoleon's sword. After the ceremony, he said "Now let's go home to die". He died little more than a year later.

== Personal life and death ==
In 1790, Moncey married Charlotte Prospère Remillet (1761–1842). The couple had three children:

- Anne-Francoise (1791–1842), married to Louis-Charles Bourlon de Chevigné, who was permitted by the King to add "de Moncey" to his surname in 1819.
- Bon-Louis (1792–1817)
- Jeanne-Francoise (1807–1853), married Alphonse-Auguste Duchesne de Gillevoisin de Conegliano (1798–1878), 2nd Baron de Gillevoisin and later 2nd Duke of Conegliano and 2nd Baron of Conegliano, who inherited his father-in-law's titles.

He died on 20 April 1842 in Paris.

== Sources ==
- Beckett, Ian F. W. (1987). "Moncey: An Honest Man". In Chandler, David G. (ed.). Napoleon's Marshals. New York, N.Y.: Macmillan. ISBN 0-02-905930-5.
- Clerget, Charles (1905). Tableaux des Armées Françaises pendant les Guerres de la Révolution (in French). Paris: Librarie Militaire R. Chapelot et Cie.

Military offices
| Preceded by Jacques Léonard Muller | Commander-in-chief of the Army of the Western Pyrenees; 1 September 1794–12 October 1795 | Succeeded by disbanded |
| Preceded by Guillaume Brune | Interim Commander-in-chief of the Army of Italy; 8 March–19 June 1801 | Succeeded by disbanded |
