= Jacques-Luc Barbier-Walbonne =

French painter (1769 –1860)

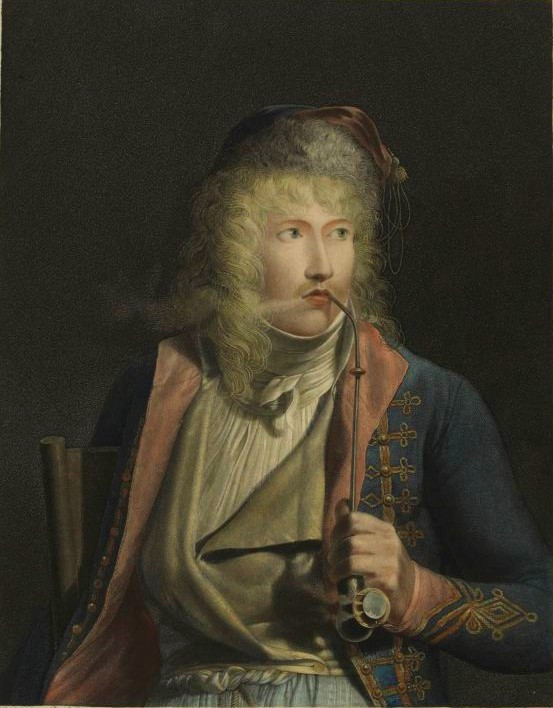
- Jacques-Luc Barbier-Walbonne engraved by François Aubertin, painted by Jean-Baptiste Isabey, (Musée de la Révolution française)
- Born: 1769; Nîmes, Kingdom of France
- Died: 1860 (aged 90–91); Passy, Paris, France
- Known for: Historical painting; portrait painting

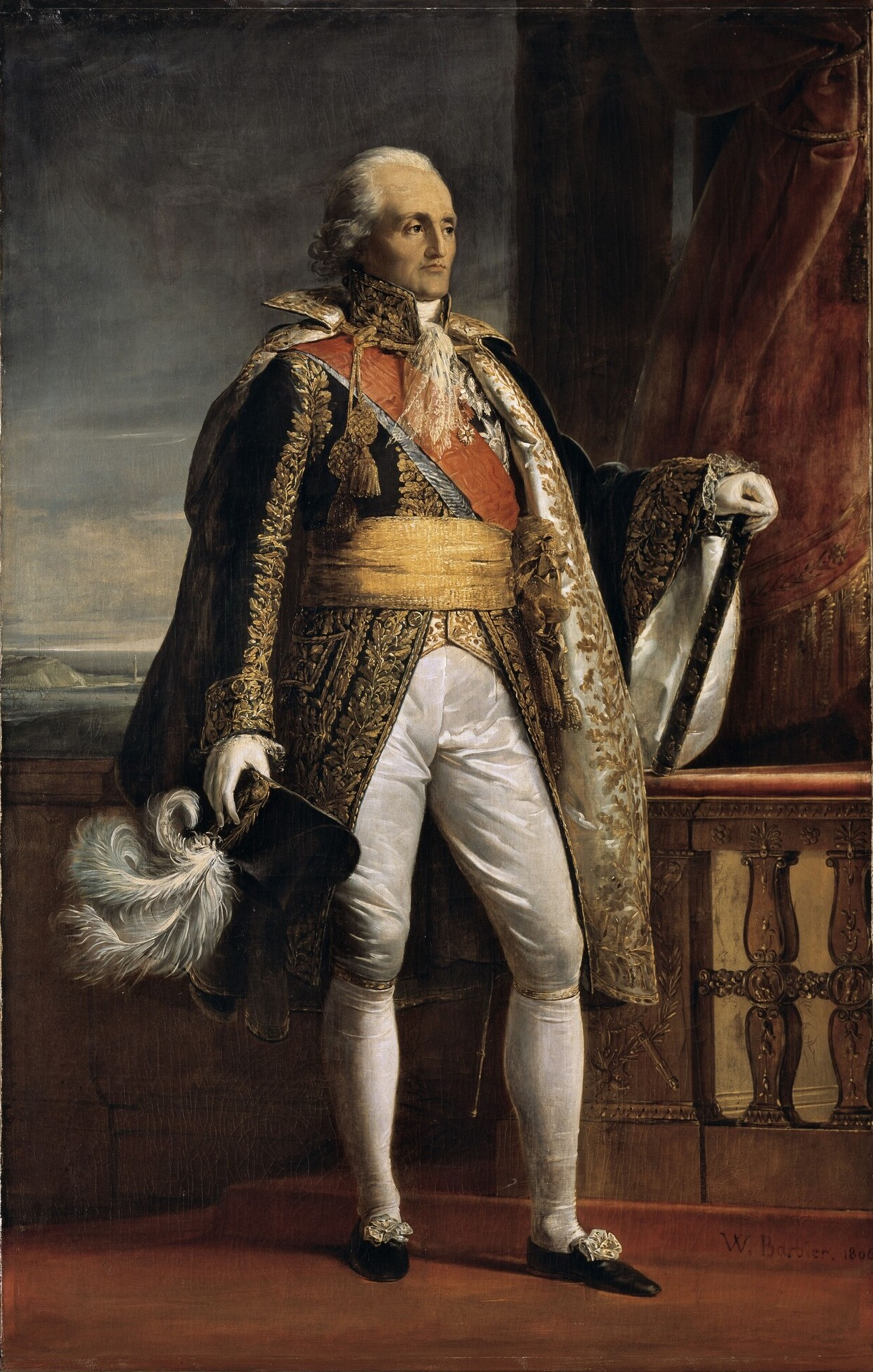
Jacques-Luc Barbier-Walbonne, Bon Adrien Jeannot Moncey, Duke of Conegliano, Marshal of France, Oil on canvas. 1806

Jacques-Luc Barbier-Walbonne (1769 –1860) was a French historical and portrait painter.

== Early life ==
Barbier-Walbonne was born at Nîmes in 1769.

== Career ==
He was a pupil of Jacques-Louis David, and painted several subjects from Roman history, and others of a less heroic kind; also portraits of the distinguished generals of France. In the Gallery of Versailles are portraits, by him, of Moreau and Moncey.

He was a soldier during the French Revolutionary period, and was shown wearing the uniform of a lieutenant in a regiment of hussars in a drawing by Jean-Baptiste Isabey. He worked as an assistant to François Gérard, and is said to have posed for the figure of Cupid in Gérard's Cupid and Psyche, shown at the Salon in 1798.

== Death ==
He died at Passy in 1860.
